= Core Molding Technologies =

American manufacturer of sheet molding compounds

Core Molding Technologies, Inc
- Company type: Public
- Traded as: AMEX: CMT; Russell Microcap Index component
- Industry: Rubber & Plastics
- Founded: 1988
- Headquarters: Columbus, Ohio, United States
- Key people: Dave Duvall (CEO) John Zimmer (CFO)
- Products: Fiber reinforced plastics and plastic composites
- Services: Services to assist manufacturing and product development
- Website: www.coremt.com

Core Molding Technologies, Inc. was founded in 1988 (its original name was Core Materials Corporation) and now based in Columbus, Ohio. The company manufactures sheet molding compounds (SMC), and molds fiberglass reinforced plastics. It occupies over 1,000,000 square feet of manufacturing space and its main subsidiaries are in Matamoros, Mexico, Gaffney, South Carolina, and Cincinnati, Ohio. In 2011, Core Molding Technologies formed Core Specialty Composites, LLC.

== History ==
1980: The predecessor company Columbus Plastic Operations was set up.
1996: The company (firstly named Core Materials Corporation) was set up and acquired Columbus Plastic Operations.
2002: The company changed its name to Core Molding Technologies, Inc.
2011: The company formed Core Specialty Composites, LLC

In March 2013, Core Molding Technologies, Inc. received a significant new business opportunity award from Volvo Group North America LLC.

== Products and services ==
Core Molding Technologies specializes in large-format moldings and provides fiberglass processes, such as compression molding process (SMC, GMT), spray-up, hand lay-up, resin transfer molding (RTM), and reaction injection molding (RIM). Core Molding Technologies mainly produced fiber reinforced plastics and plastic composites such as shielding, vehicle roofs, hoods and so on. Additionally, it provides services for manufacturing and product development, such as custom material formulations, composite mold construction, design for manufacturability and so on. Next Generation Product Released: Core Molding Technologies' Featherlite® SMC Production Reaches 10,000,000 lbs.

== Operations ==
=== Research and development ===
2011.2, The company introduced Featherlite® SMC, with a 1.43 sp.gr (relative density), lighter than standard-density SMC (1.9 sp.gr).
2012, The company introduced N-sulGuard® SMC to support Ag and Construction Equipment and Electrical markets.
2013.8, the company announced Airilite™, an ultra-low density SMC, about 1.18 sp.gr.
2013.10, the company announced the low-density Featherlite® SMC has reached 10,000,000 pounds. This also announced FeatherliteXL™ SMC, the company's second-generation advancement, began to develop.

== Awards ==
Core Molding Technologies, because of its stable supplies, was presented a "Supplier of the Year" award for 2012 by Kautex Textron GmbH & Co. KG., one of the 100 largest global automotive suppliers.
