= Fiberglass molding =

Process in which fiberglass reinforced resin plastics are formed into useful shapes

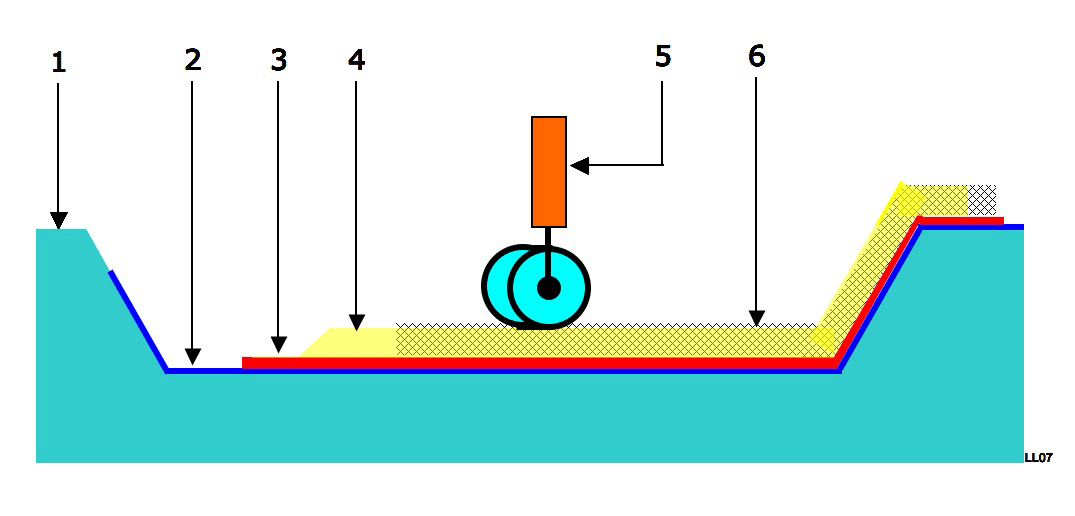
- Hand lay-up moulding. Visualization of the Hand lay-up process
- Process type: Molding
- Product(s): Fiberglass

Fiberglass molding is a process in which fiberglass reinforced resin plastics are formed into useful shapes.

The process usually involves first making a mold and then using the mold to make the fiberglass component.

== Mold making ==
The fiberglass mold process begins with an object known as the plug or buck. This is an exact representation of the object to be made. The plug can be made from a variety of materials, usually certain types of foam.

After the plug has been formed, it is sprayed with a mold release agent. The release agent will allow the mold to be separated from the plug once it is finished. The mold release agent is a special wax, and/or PVA (Polyvinyl alcohol). Polyvinyl alcohol, however, is said to have negative effects on the final mold's surface finish.

Once the plug has its release agent applied, gelcoat is applied with a roller, brush or specially designed spray gun. The gelcoat is pigmented resin, and gives the mold surface a harder, more durable finish.

Once the release agent and gelcoat are applied, layers of fiberglass and resin are laid-up onto the surface. The fiberglass used will typically be identical to that which will be used in the final product.

In the laying-up process, a layer of fiberglass mat is applied, and resin is applied over it. A special roller is then used to remove air bubbles. Air bubbles, if left in the curing resin, would significantly reduce the strength of the finished mold. The fiberglass spray lay-up process is also used to produce molds, and can provide good filling of corners and cavities where a glass mat or weave may prove to be too stiff.

Once the final layers of fiberglass are applied to the mold, the resin is allowed to set up and cure. Wedges are then driven between the plug and the mold in order to separate the two.

Advanced techniques such as resin transfer molding are also used.

== Making a component ==
The component-making process involves building up a component on the fiberglass mold. The mold is a negative image of the component to be made, so the fiberglass will be applied inside the mold, rather than around it.

As in the mold-making process, release agent is first applied to the mold. Colored gelcoat is then applied. Layers of fiberglass are then applied, using the same procedure as before. Once completed and cured, the component is separated from the mold using wedges, compressed air or both.

== See also ==
- Fiber-reinforced plastic
- Glass-reinforced plastic
- Other types of mold processing
