= TFP =

TFP may stand for:

== Arts and entertainment ==
- Time for print
- Transformers: Prime
- Travaux Forcés à Perpetuité, French for "hard labour for life", as stated in Les Misérables by Victor Hugo

== Businesses and organisations ==
- Tradition, Family and Property, a Catholic movement
  - American Society for the Defense of Tradition, Family and Property
- Terry Farrell and Partners, a British architecture firm
- Taiwan Farmers' Party, a Taiwanese political party
- The Food Project, Massachusetts, US, a non-profit

== Finance ==
- Tobacco-Free Portfolios
- Total factor productivity

== Science, medicine and technology ==
- Tailored fiber placement, in textile manufacture
- Tapered floating point, in arithmetic
- Thin-filament pyrometry, temperature measurement technique
- Thin film polarizer, in optics
- Total functional programming, in computer programming
- Transference focused psychotherapy, a bipolar disorder treatment
- Trifluoperazine, an antipsychotic
- Trifluoroproscaline, a psychedelic drug

== Other ==
- Tech for Palestine (a.k.a. T4P or TFP), a coordinated effort of advocacy groups who engage with issues related to the Israeli–Palestinian conflict through technology
