= Light resin transfer moulding =

Light resin transfer moulding (Light RTM) is a process by which products of Composite materials are manufactured using a closed mold system.

== Procedure ==
Similar to the methods performed in resin transfer molding, Light RTM involves a closed mold process. A vacuum holds mold A and mold B together to result in two finished sides with fixed thickness levels. Vacuum rings around the tools hold the molds together for this process after dry fiber reinforcements are loaded into mold A before joining with mold B.

The air is vacuumed out of the molds with a lower vacuum level, separate from the tooling. After the air is removed the resin is injected into the part. The vacuum remains in effect into the resin is cured.
