= Autoclave moulding =

Autoclave moulding is an advanced composite manufacturing process.

== Procedure ==
It is a process that uses a two-sided mould set that forms both surfaces of the panel. On the upper side is a flexible membrane made from silicone or an extruded polymer film such as nylon and on the lower side is a rigid mould. Reinforcement materials can be placed manually or robotically. They involve continuous fibre forms fashioned into textile constructions. Usually, they are pre-impregnated with the resin in the form of prepreg fabrics or unidirectional tapes. In some situations, a film of resin is placed upon the lower mould, and dry reinforcement is placed above. The upper mould is installed, and the vacuum is applied to the mould cavity. The assembly is placed into an autoclave. This process is generally performed at both elevated pressure and elevated temperature. The use of elevated pressure facilitates a high fibre volume fraction and low void content for maximum structural efficiency.
