= Short fiber thermoplastics =

Type of plastic composite material

Thermoplastics containing short fiber reinforcements were first introduced commercially in the 1960s. The most common type of fibers used in short fiber thermoplastics are glass fiber and carbon fiber . Adding short fibers to thermoplastic resins improves the composite performance for lightweight applications. In addition, short fiber thermoplastic composites are easier and cheaper to produce than continuous fiber reinforced composites. This compromise between cost and performance allows short fiber reinforced thermoplastics to be used in myriad applications.

== Mechanical properties ==
Mechanical properties of short fiber reinforced composites depend critically on the fiber length distribution (FLD) and the fiber orientation distribution (FOD). In particular, the strength of short fiber reinforced composites increases with the increase of the mean fiber length and with the decrease of the mean fiber orientation angle (angle between the fiber axis and the loading direction). The elastic modulus (E) of misaligned short fiber reinforced polymer composites depends on the distributions of fiber lengths and orientations within the composite structure. In general, the composite elastic modulus increases with the decrease of the mean fiber orientation angle and with the increase of the fiber orientation coefficient; and the elastic modulus increases with the increase of mean fiber length when the mean fiber length is small. When the mean fiber length is large, it has nearly no influence on the elastic modulus of short fiber reinforced composites.

== Aspect ratio ==
An important characterizing parameter of short fiber composites is the aspect ratio (s) defined as the ratio between the length (l) and the diameter (d) of the fibers used as reinforcement:

$$s =\frac{l}{d}$$

The value of s can vary depending on fiber type and design, assuming values from approximately 50 to 500. Aspect ratios can affect properties such as the strain to failure and toughness. A higher aspect ratio will result in lower values of strain at failure and toughness, due to angular particles inducing crack formation.

== Void formation ==
Short fiber reinforced composites are used increasingly as a structural material because they provide superior mechanical properties and can be easily produced by the rapid, low-cost injection molding process, by extrusion and with spray-up technique. An important issue for short fiber thermoplastic composites is void formation and growth during production processes. It has been shown that voids tend to nucleate at fiber ends, and their content depends on processing conditions, fiber concentration, and fiber length. For example, in an injection molding process bubble growth is suppressed by cooling the material under pressure. Density measurements confirm a much lower void content (-1%) in the injection-molded samples in comparison with the extrudates. Another factor playing an important role in void formation is the cooling rate. While the melt is cooled external surface layers solidify first. These layers restrain the contraction of material within the melt. This leads to internal voiding. As a result, slower cooling rates decrease void content in the composite. Finally, in an extruded structure, longer fibers result in higher void contents. This unexpected behaviour is due to the overcoming of other factors like viscosity, extrusion pressure and shear rate, which make the analysis on this phenomenon very complicated.

== Simulations and modelling ==
Short fiber thermoplastics can be modelled as a matrix with fiber inclusions. According to the inclusion model, the stress within the material is proportional to the product of inclusion volume fraction and the stress within a single inclusion. In other words, the stress within the composite is proportional to the fiber volume fraction and the stress on a single fiber. Using Mean Field Theory and the Mori-Tanaka model, the stresses within a short fiber thermoplastic can be modelled computationally. Assuming the matrix is a newtonian material, the creep from an applied shear stress can be approximated from equilibrium thermodynamics. This will yield information about the composite's rheological response.

== Applications and processing ==
Short fiber reinforced thermoplastics have a broad range of applications due to fiber reinforcement properties. Short fiber thermoplastics are able to withstand up to 30,000 psi of applied tensile load and have an elastic modulus on the order of 2 million psi. They are ideal for applications for which toughness is of critical importance, high volume production is involved, and long shelf life and scrap recycling are important issues. With all of these performance capabilities, one of the greatest advantages to using short fiber reinforced thermoplastics is their ease of processing and reprocessability. Ease of processing has been the key factor to the widespread use of short fiber reinforced thermoplastics. Effective processing techniques and the ability to recycle scrap offer significant cost reductions that compare to those of thermoset compounds and metals. Because of this, short fiber reinforced thermoplastics are desired in the electrical and electronic, automotive, oilfield, chemical process, and defense industries. Although short fiber thermoplastics have progressed considerably over the years and have a secured spot in a colossally-sized market, further refinement of compounding and process technology along with improvements in part design could allow the performance window of these materials to widen significantly, allowing them to be used for more applications in the future.

== Morphology ==
Injection molding is a traditional cost-effective method for manufacturing of short-fiber thermoplastics. The processing conditions such as mold temperature and pressure as well as filling time, the part geometry, position and number of injection gates are main factors influencing distribution of fibers. As a result, depending on the total thickness of the manufactured parts as well as the distance from mold wall, different fiber orientation distributions can be observed. In a thin layer in mid-thickness fiber orientations are preferably perpendicular to the mold flow direction, while in two near wall thicknesses fibers are preferably in line with the mold flow direction.

== Self-heating ==
An aspect of thermoplastics which distinguishes them from metallic materials is their time dependent properties as well as relatively low melting temperatures. As a result, the frequency at which a load is applied or rate of applied load is a determining factor on mechanical properties of such materials. Due to low thermal conductivity of thermoplastics, the generated heat due to energy dissipation under applying load results in self-heating or thermal degradation. In short fiber thermoplastics, the frictional heating between fiber and matrix as well as a higher intensity of stress near fiber ends increase the degree of self-heating.
