= Tsai-Hill failure criterion =

Composite materials failure criterion

The Tsai–Hill failure criterion is one of the phenomenological material failure theories, which is widely used for anisotropic composite materials which have different strengths in tension and compression. The Tsai-Hill criterion predicts failure when the failure index in a laminate reaches 1.

== Tsai–Hill failure criterion in plane stress ==
The Tsai-Hill criterion is based on an energy theory with interactions between stresses. Ply rupture appears when:

$$\begin{align}
\left(\cfrac{\sigma_{11}}{X_{11}}\right)^2 - \left(\cfrac{\sigma_{11} \sigma_{22}}{X_{11}^2}\right) + \left(\cfrac{\sigma_{22}}{X_{22}}\right)^2 + \left(\cfrac{\tau_{12}}{S_{12}}\right)^2 \geq 1
\end{align}$$

Where:

$$\begin{align}
X_{11} \end{align}$$
is the allowable strength of the ply in the longitudinal direction (0° direction)
$$\begin{align}
X_{22} \end{align}$$
is the allowable strength of the ply in the transversal direction (90° direction)
$$\begin{align}
S_{12} \end{align}$$
is the allowable in-plane shear strength of the ply between the longitudinal and the transversal directions

The Tsai hill criterion is interactive, i.e. the stresses in different directions are not decoupled and do affect the failure simultaneously. Furthermore, it is a failure mode independent criterion, as it does not predict the way in which the material will fail, as opposed to mode-dependent criteria such as the Hashin criterion, or the Puck failure criterion. This can be important as some types of failure can be more critical than others.
