= Discontinuous aligned composite =

Fiber reinforced composite manufacturing method

Discontinuous aligned composites are a recent type of technical composite materials. This type of composite is neither random nor unidirectional, although it shares some characteristics with both. Discontinuous aligned composites are made of discontinuous fibers, just like random mat composites and a have preferential orientation closer to that of unidirectional composites.

The first method developed to manufacture discontinuous aligned composites is called "rolling drum", developed at the University of Nottingham. This method borrows the technique from the papier-mâché industry, using a nozzle that delivers a suspension of water and chopped fibers into a rolling drum.

The second method is known as HiPerDiF (high performance discontinuous fibre), developed at the University of Bristol. HiPerDiF uses an array of nozzles to direct the water-fiber suspension towards alignment plates that are perpendicular to the nozzles. The change in momentum of the water hitting the plates, orients the fibers in the direction of the plates. After hitting the plates, the suspension falls on a continuous belt that dries and laminates the composite

Discontinuous aligned composites present a great alternative for the recycling of composite materials, as they can use fibers that are anywhere from 2mm to 20mm long. The current forecast for waste carbon composite materials estimates that it will reach 25,000 tons in 2025. This is a material that can have a second life when used in discontinuous aligned composites.
