= Tailored fiber placement =

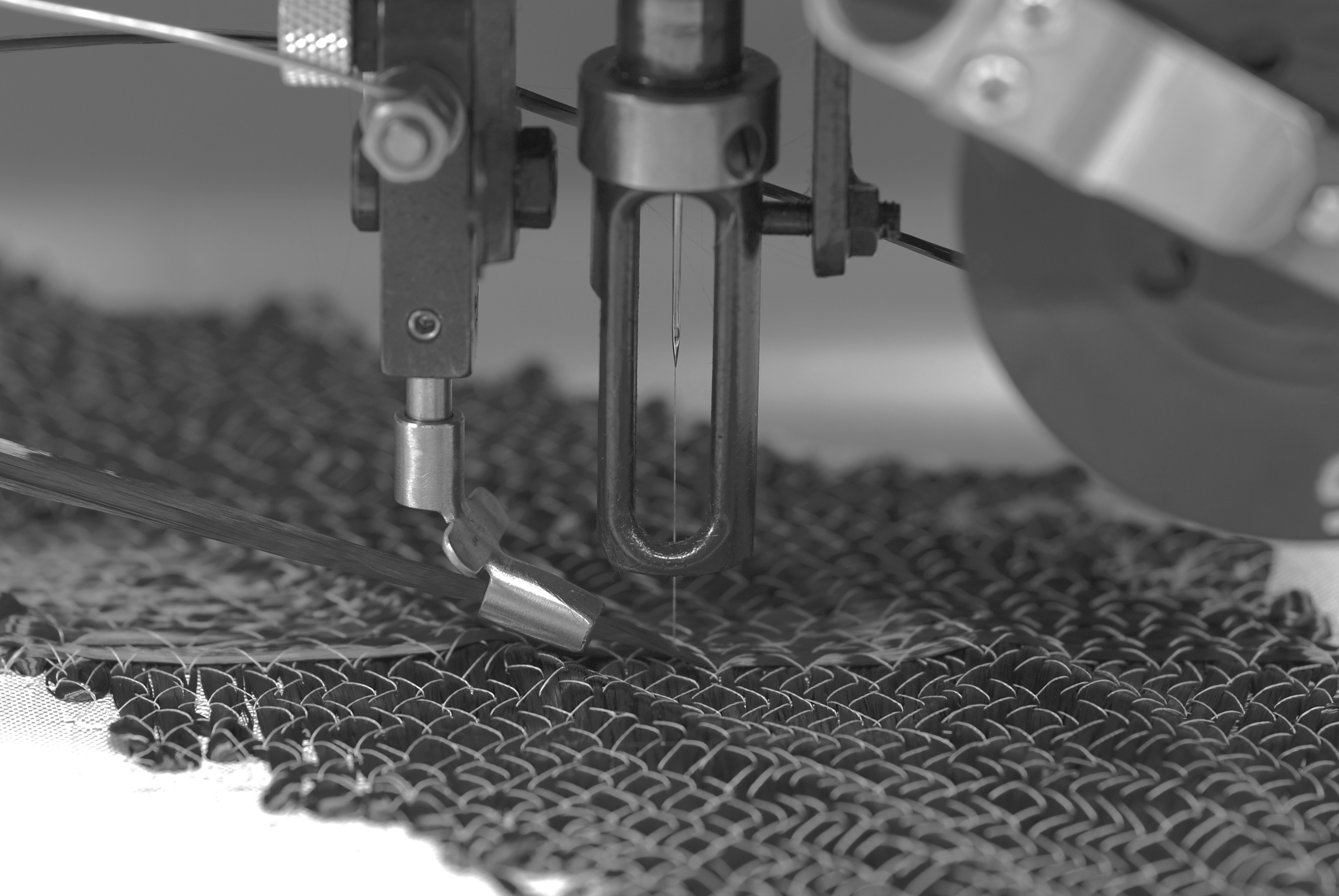
Detail of a stitching head of an embroidery machine used for tailored fiber placement manufacturing process

Tailored fiber placement (TFP) is a textile manufacturing technique based on the principle of sewing for a continuous placement of fibrous material for composite components. The fibrous material is fixed with an upper and lower stitching thread on a base material. Compared to other textile manufacturing processes fiber material can be placed near net-shape in curvilinear patterns upon a base material in order to create stress adapted composite parts.

== History ==
TFP technology was introduced in the early 1990s by the IPF Dresden. At the beginning handmade stitched reinforcement structures (preforms) were manufactured initialized by an industry inquiry about stress adapted fiber-reinforced plastic (FRP) parts with a curvilinear pattern. An adaptation of this method to industrial embroidery machines, by using the sewing capabilities of those automates, was implemented in the mid-90s. The technology was named Tailored Fiber Placement, which describes the variable axial near-net-shape fibre placement capabilities. Nowadays, the Tailored Fiber Placement is already in several companies a well-established textile technology for dry preform manufacturing applying TFP machines by the manufacturer TAJIMA.

== Principle of the technology ==
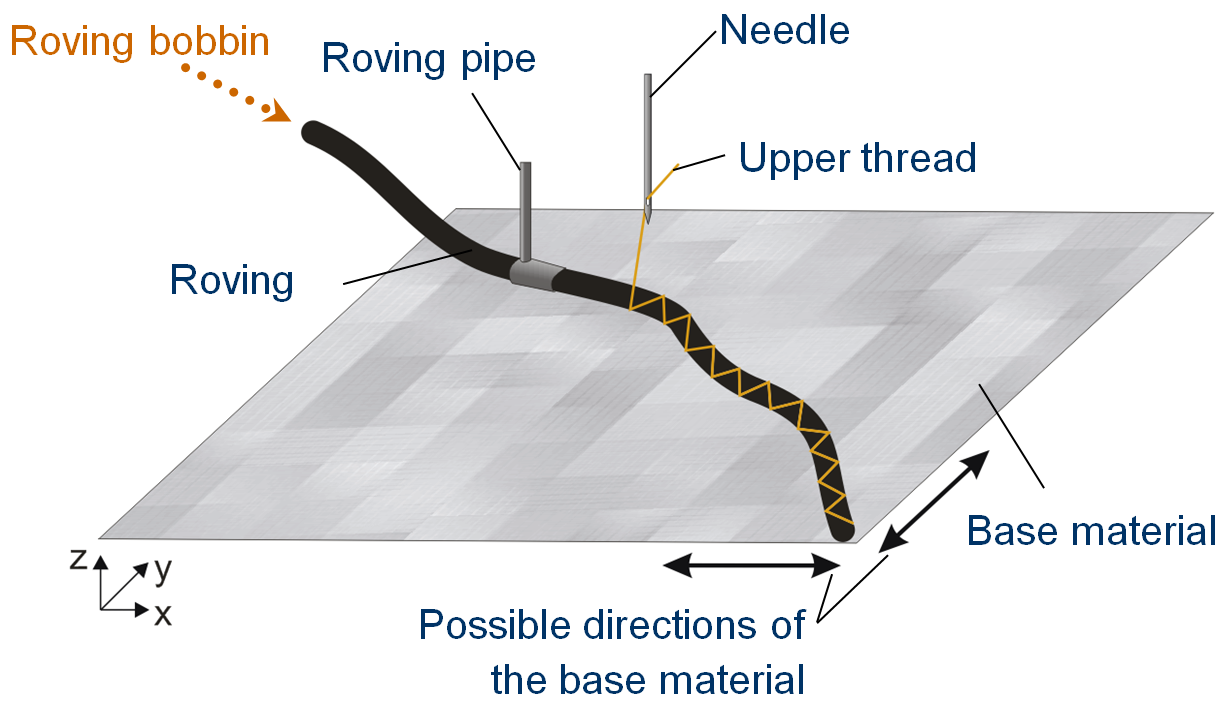
Sketch of the principle of the tailored fiber placement manufacturing process

Based on embroidery machinery used in the garment textile industry, the machines have been adapted to deposit and stitch fiber roving material onto a base material. Roving material, mostly common carbon fibers, from about 3,000 up to 50,000 filaments can be applied. The preform is produced continuously by the placement of a single roving. The roving material pulled off a spool is guided by a pipe which is positioned in front of the stitching needle. The roving pipe and the frame, where the base material is fixed onto, move synchronized stepwise to perform a zigzag stitch relative to needle position. The stitching head equipped with roving spool, pipe and needle can rotate arbitrarily 360 degrees. During each stitch the upper thread is pulled through the base material and looped around the lower thread spool. Hence a double backstitch is performed. Currently, up to 800 stitches per minute can be achieved. The base material can be a 2D-textile such as woven or non-woven fabric or a matrix-compatible foil material for thermoplastic composites. The stitching path can be designed in form of a pattern either with the help of classical design embroidery software or more recently by use of 2D-CAD systems. Afterwards necessary information of the stitch positions are added to the pattern with the help of so-called punch software and finally transferred to the TFP machine.

The infiltration of TFP-preforms can be done with conventional processing techniques such as resin transfer moulding, vacuum bag molding, pressing and autoclave moulding. In the case of thermoplastic composites the matrix material and the reinforcement fibers can be placed simultaneously e.g. in the form of films or fibers. The base material can then be a thermoplastic foil which melts during the consolidation process and becomes part of the matrix. This type is ideally suited for deep-drawn TFP-preforms.

== Advantages of the TFP technology ==
• Net-shape manufacturing reduces costs and waste of valuable reinforcement fibers, e.g. carbon fibers
• Automatic deposition ensures high accuracy and repeatability of amount and orientation of fibers
• TFP machines with multiple heads can be applied to achieve a reasonable productivity; each head is manufacturing in a synchronized way the same preform
• Fibers can be orientated in an arbitrary direction in order to manufacture highly stress adapted composite parts
• A variety of fibers such as carbon, glass, basalt, aramid, natural, thermoplastic, ceramic fibers and also metallic threads can be applied and combined within one preform

== Applications for structural parts ==
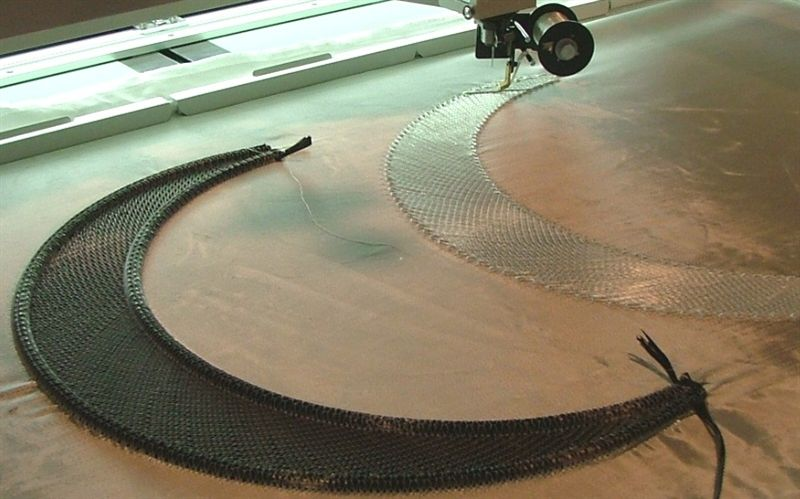
TFP manufactured prefoms made of carbon and glass fibers for structural FRP parts

The TFP technology allows the fabrication of preforms tailored for specific composite components or reinforcements. Applications range from highly accelerated lightweight parts for industrial robots or blades for compressors up to CFRP aircraft parts, e.g. I-beam for the NH-90 helicopter, automotive structures and bicycle parts.

== TFP for self-heating tooling and components ==
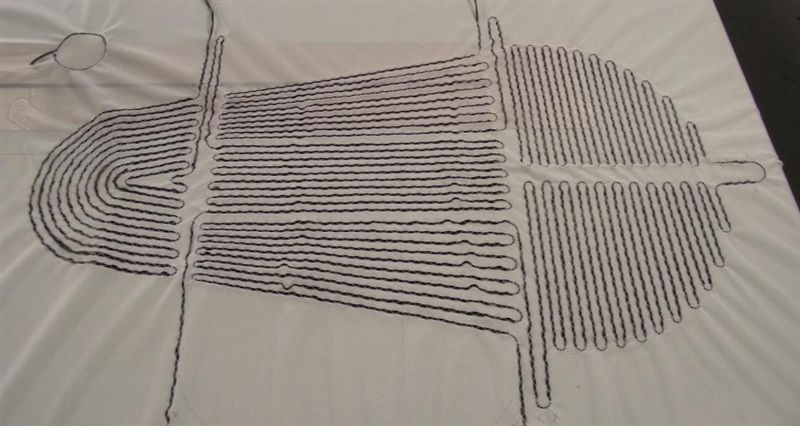
Preform of a carbon layer heating structure

Using the carbon roving as an electric heating element offers the possibility to manufacture composite structures with embedded heating layers. Due to the high flexibility in the design of the heating pattern an overall nearly equal heat distribution can be achieved. In terms of applications this technology embedded in solid composite molds is very beneficial for resin consolidation and binder activation in out-of-autoclave processes. Composite molds show similar heat expansion properties as the manufactured composite parts. The lower thermal mass of composite tools compared to common metal molds help to shorten the manufacturing cycle of FRP parts and decrease the energy need for the production process. Further the TFP heating elements can be applied in CFRP wing structures of airplanes or blades of wind mills for anti- and de-icing tasks. The TFP structure embedded in elastomeric heating bags can applied to manufacturing or repairing processes of composite parts.
