= Long-fiber-reinforced thermoplastic =

Long-fiber-reinforced thermoplastic (LFRTs) is a type of easily mouldable thermoplastic used to create a variety of components used primarily in the automotive industry. LFRTs are one of the fastest growing categories in thermoplastic technologies. Leading this expansion is one of the oldest forms, glass mat thermoplastic (GMT) and two of the segment's newest: precompounded (pelletized) LFRTs (long-fiber-reinforced thermoplastics), also known as LFTs, and inline compounded (ILC) or direct LFTs (D-LFTs).

LFRTs differ from the composite structures used in the aerospace industry for components such as aircraft parts. The fibers in LFRTs are relatively short (6.35 mm/0.25 in. or greater) compared to the fibres contained in composite aircraft components. High performance composites usually contain fibers as long as the component itself (6 metres or longer).

Their structural properties and low cost per part have enabled LFRTs to replace metal parts in the automotive industry. In addition, some new organic fibers can even be recyclable. With the independence of choosing the reinforcement from a wide range of fibers and the matrix from a wide range of thermoplastics polymer in the LFRTs, its property can be changed according to customer needs. LFRTs have become an increasingly valuable and popular part of building envelope components such as windows and doors.

== Manufacture ==
LFRT components or semi-finished products are made by compression or injection molding. Fibers are contained in the polymer matrix, often in the form of a granulate raw material. Long Fiber Reinforced Thermoplastic Compounds are typically 10–12 mm in length. Fiber is unidirectional along the length of the 12 mm pellet.

== See also ==
- FRP tanks and vessels (The strength of the fibres is used to make a tank extra strong in the tangential direction, where it is double the longitudinal direction due to the stresses)
- Fibre-reinforced plastic
