= Fiberglass spray lay-up process =

Finishing process on fiberglass applications

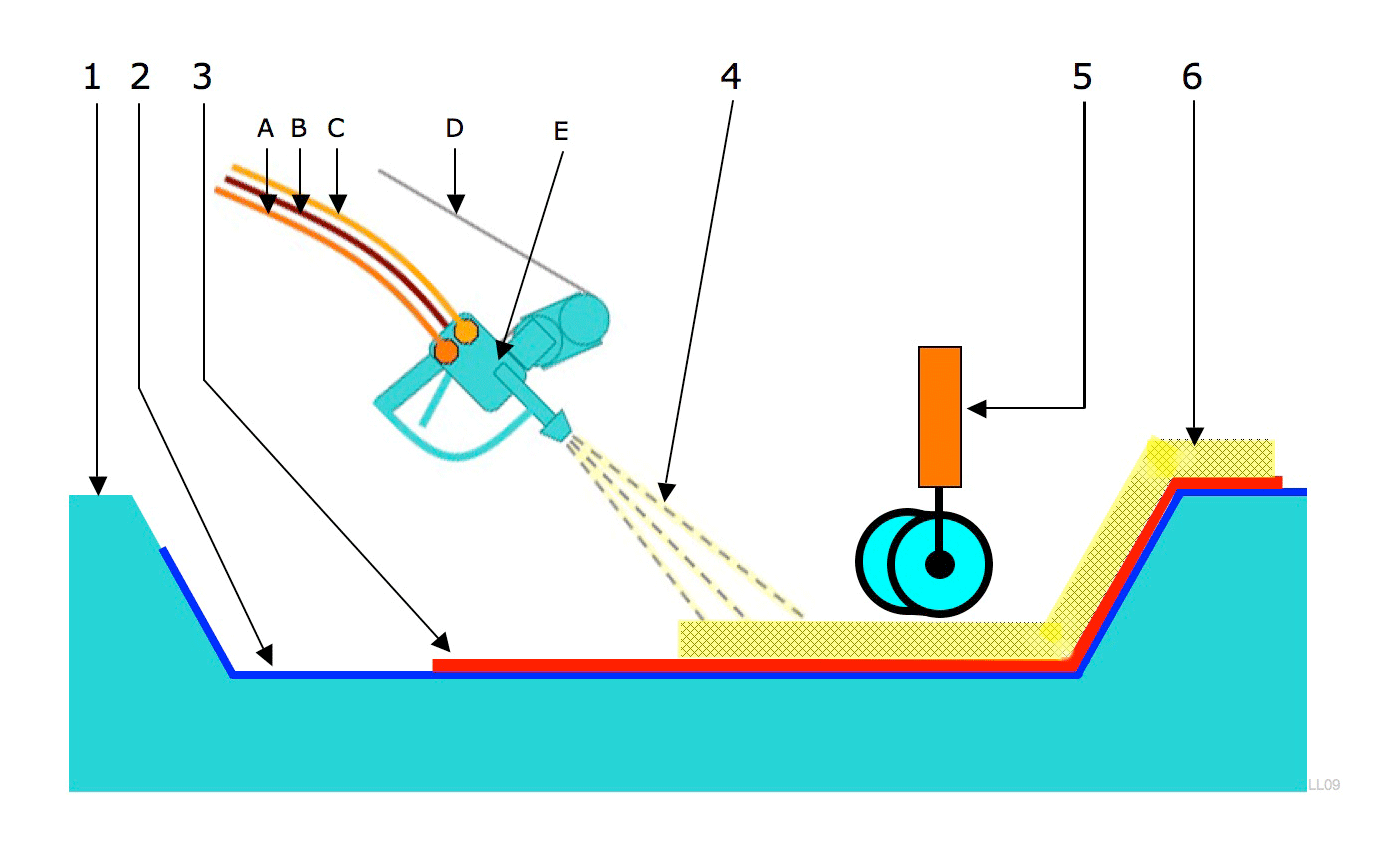
Diagram of spray-up process

Spray-Up also known as chop method of creating fiberglass objects by spraying short strands of glass out of a pneumatic gun. This method is used often when one side of the finished product is not seen, or when large quantities of a product must be made cheaply and quickly with moderate strength requirements. Corvette fenders and boat dinghies are commonly manufactured this way.

It is very different from the hand lay-up process. The difference comes from the application of the fibre and resin material to the mould. Spray-up is an open-moulding composites fabrication process where resin and reinforcements are sprayed onto a reusable mould. The resin and glass may be applied separately or simultaneously "chopped" in a combined stream from a chopper gun. Workers roll out the spray-up to compact the laminate. Wood, foam, or other core material may then be added, and a secondary spray-up layer embeds the core between the laminates. The part is then cured, cooled, and removed from the mould.

== Applications ==
Applications include making of custom parts in low to medium volume quantities. Bathtubs, swimming pools, boat hulls, storage tanks, duct and air handling equipment, and furniture components are some of the commercial uses of this process.

== Basic materials ==
The basic reinforcement material for this process is glass-fibre rovings, which are chopped to a length of 10 to 40 mm and then applied on the mould. For improved mechanical properties, a combination of fabric and chopped fibre layers is used. The most common material type is E-glass, but carbon and Kevlar rovings can also be used. Continuous strand mat, fabric, and various types of core materials are embedded by hand whenever required. The weight fraction of reinforcement in this process is typically 20 to 40% of the total weight of the part. The most common resin system used for the spray-up process is general purpose or DCDP polyester; isophthalic polyesters and vinyl ester resins are also sometimes used. Fast-reacting resins with a pot life of 30 to 40 minutes are typical. The resin often contains a significant amount of filler. The most common fillers are calcium carbonates and aluminium trihydrates. In filled resin systems, fillers replace some of the reinforcements; 5 to 25% filler is used by weight.

Steel, wood, GRP, and other materials are used as mould materials for prototyping purposes. The mould can be a male or female mould. To make shower bathtubs, a male mould is used. In the boating industry, a single-sided female mould made from FRP (fibre-reinforced plastic) is used to make yacht hulls. The outer shell of the mould is stiffened by a wood frame. The mould is made by taking the reversal of a male pattern. Several different hull sizes can be made using the same mould. The length of the mould is shortened or lengthened using inserts and mould secondaries such as windows, air vents, and propeller shaft tunnels.

== Processing requirements ==
The processing steps are very similar to those in hand lay-up. In this process, the release agent is first applied to the mould and then a layer of gelcoat is applied. The gelcoat is left for two hours, until it hardens. Once the gelcoat hardens, a spray gun is used to deposit the fibre resin mixture onto the surface of the mould. The spray gun chops the incoming continuous rovings (one or more rovings) to a predetermined length and impels it through the resin/catalyst mixture. Resin/catalyst mixing can take place inside the gun (gun mixing) or just in front of the gun. Gun mixing provides thorough mixing of resin and catalyst inside the gun and is preferred to minimize the health hazard concerns of the operator. In the other type, the catalyst is sprayed through two side nozzles into the resin envelope. Airless spray guns are becoming popular because they provide more controlled spray patterns and reduced emission of volatiles. In an airless system, hydraulic pressure is used to dispense the resin through special nozzles that break up the resin stream into small droplets which then become saturated with the reinforcements. In an air-atomized spray gun system, pressurized air is used to dispense the resin.

Once the material is sprayed on the mould, brushes or rollers are used to remove entrapped air as well as to ensure good fiber wetting. Fabric layers or continuous strand mats are added into the laminate, depending on performance requirements. The curing of the resin is done at room temperature. The curing of resin can take two to four hours, depending on the resin formulation. After curing, the part is removed from the mould and tested for finishing and structural requirements.

== Manufacturing process ==
1. The mould is waxed and polished for easy removal.
2. The gelcoat (a smooth, hard polyester resin coating) is applied to the mould surface and is given time to cure before re-applying. Usually two coats of gelcoat are used.
3. The barrier coat is applied to avoid fibre print and a rough surface through the gel coat.
4. The barrier coat is cured in an oven and left to cool to room temperature.
5. After curing, calcium carbonate and aluminium trihydrate fillers are added using a high shear mixing unit.
6. A wax-like additive is added into the resin to reduce styrene discharge by 20% during lamination.
7. A fibreglass chopper is mounted on the spray gun.
8. The mixture of catalyst, resin and fibreglass is then sprayed evenly in a fan-like pattern to assure even coverage.
9. A roller is used for compaction after each layer has been applied, this removes trapped air.
10. Where desirable, wood, foam, or honeycomb cores are embedded into the laminate to create a sandwich structure. Corner and radius coverage is also checked.
11. The part is cured in an oven and left to cool to room temperature.
12. The mould is removed and is ready to be waxed and polished for the next manufacture cycle.
13. Finishing is done by trimming edges of excess fibreglass and drilling holes as needed.
14. After the part is assessed by quality control personal, it is weighed, structurally checked, and the surface finish is inspected prior to packing and shipping.

== Advantages ==
- It is a very economical process for making small to large parts.
- It utilizes low-cost tooling as well as low-cost material systems.
- It is suitable for small- to medium-volume parts.

== Limitations ==
- It is not suitable for making parts that have high structural requirements.
- It is difficult to control the fibre volume fraction as well as the thickness. These parameters highly depend on operator skill.
- Because of its open mould nature, styrene emission is a concern.
- The process offers a good surface finish on one side and a rough surface finish on the other side.
- The process is not suitable for parts where dimensional accuracy and process repeatability are prime concerns. The spray-up process does not provide a good surface finish or dimensional control on both or all the sides of the product.

== Hazards ==
Employees in fibreglass resin plastics manufacturing are exposed to multiple hazards – high levels of styrene in lamination operations, noise in spray booths and grinding areas, and dust from grinding operations.

== Sources ==
- Mazumdar, Sanjay K. Composites Manufacturing: Materials, Products, and Process Engineering. Pp 21–100. Taylor and Francis Group. CRC Press. 2002
