= Resin transfer moulding =

Resin transfer moulding (RTM) is a process for producing high performance composite components.

== Procedure ==
It is a process using a rigid two-sided mould set that forms both surfaces of the panel. Usually, the mould is formed from aluminum or steel, but sometimes composite molds are used. The two sides fit together to make a mould cavity. The distinctive feature of resin transfer moulding is that the reinforcement materials are placed into this cavity, and before the introduction of the matrix material, the mould set is closed. Resin transfer moulding involves numerous varieties which differ in the mechanics of how the resin is introduced to the reinforcement in the mould cavity. These variations include everything from the RTM methods used in out of autoclave composite manufacturing for high-tech aerospace components to vacuum infusion (for resin infusion see also boat building) to vacuum assisted resin transfer moulding (VARTM). This method can be done at either ambient or elevated temperature and is suitable for manufacturing high-performance composite components in medium volumes (1,000s to 10,000s of parts).
