= Fibre-reinforced plastic =

Composite material made of a polymer matrix reinforced with fibres

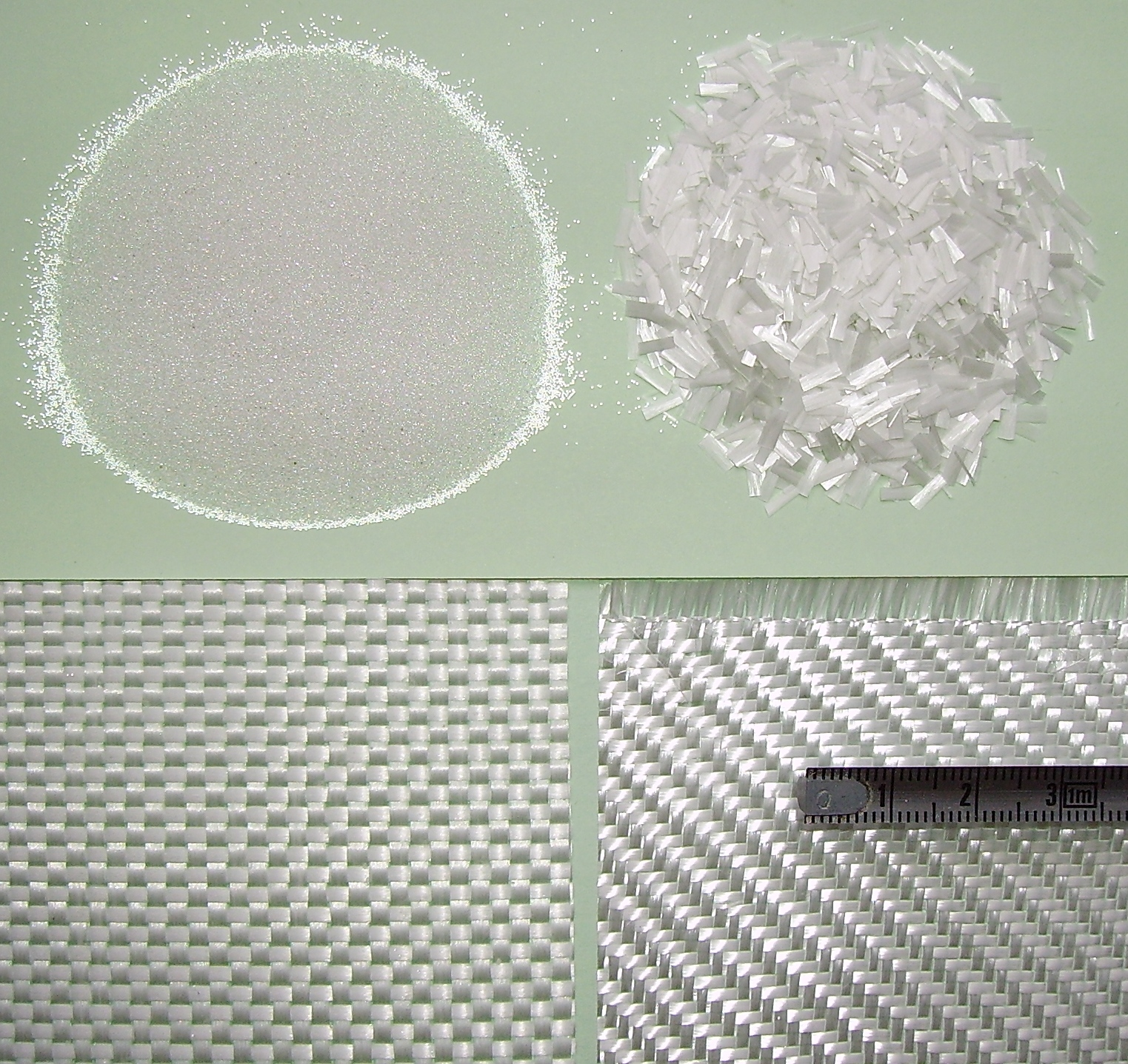
Examples of glass filler (microspheres) plastics reinforcement material, shown in both taffeta and twill weave patterns (below).

Fibre-reinforced plastic (FRP; also called fibre-reinforced polymer, or in American English fiber) is a composite material made of a polymer matrix reinforced with fibres. The fibres are usually glass (in fibreglass), carbon (in carbon-fibre-reinforced polymer), aramid, or basalt. Rarely, other fibres such as paper, wood, boron, or asbestos have been used. The polymer is usually an epoxy, vinyl ester, or polyester thermosetting plastic, though phenol formaldehyde resins are still in use.

FRPs are commonly used in the aerospace, automotive, marine, and construction industries. They are commonly found in ballistic armour and cylinders for self-contained breathing apparatuses.

== History ==
Bakelite was the first fibre-reinforced plastic. Leo Baekeland had originally set out to find a replacement for shellac (made from the excretion of lac bugs). Chemists had begun to recognise that many natural resins and fibres were polymers, and Baekeland investigated the reactions of phenol and formaldehyde. He first produced a soluble phenol-formaldehyde shellac called "Novolak" that never became a market success, then turned to developing a binder for asbestos which, at that time, was moulded with rubber. By controlling the pressure and temperature applied to phenol and formaldehyde, he found in 1905 he could produce his dreamed of hard mouldable material (the world's first synthetic plastic): bakelite. He announced his invention at a meeting of the American Chemical Society on 5 February 1909.

The development of fibre-reinforced plastic for commercial use was being extensively researched in the 1930s. In the United Kingdom, considerable research was undertaken by pioneers such as Norman de Bruyne. It was particularly of interest to the aviation industry.

Mass production of glass strands was discovered in 1932, when Games Slayter, a researcher at Owens-Illinois accidentally directed a jet of compressed air at a stream of molten glass and produced fibres. A patent for this method of producing glass wool was first applied for in 1933. Owens joined with the Corning company in 1935 and the method was adapted by Owens Corning to produce its patented "fibreglas" (one "s") in 1936. Originally, fibreglas was a glass wool with fibres entrapping a great deal of gas, making it useful as an insulator, especially at high temperatures.

A suitable resin for combining the "fibreglas" with a plastic to produce a composite material, was developed in 1936 by du Pont. The first ancestor of modern polyester resins is Cyanamid's resin of 1942. Peroxide curing systems were used by then. With the combination of fibreglas and resin the gas content of the material was replaced by plastic. This reduced the insulation properties to values typical of the plastic, but now for the first time the composite showed great strength and promise as a structural and building material. Confusingly, many glass fibre composites continued to be called "fibreglass" (as a generic name) and the name was also used for the low-density glass wool product containing gas instead of plastic.

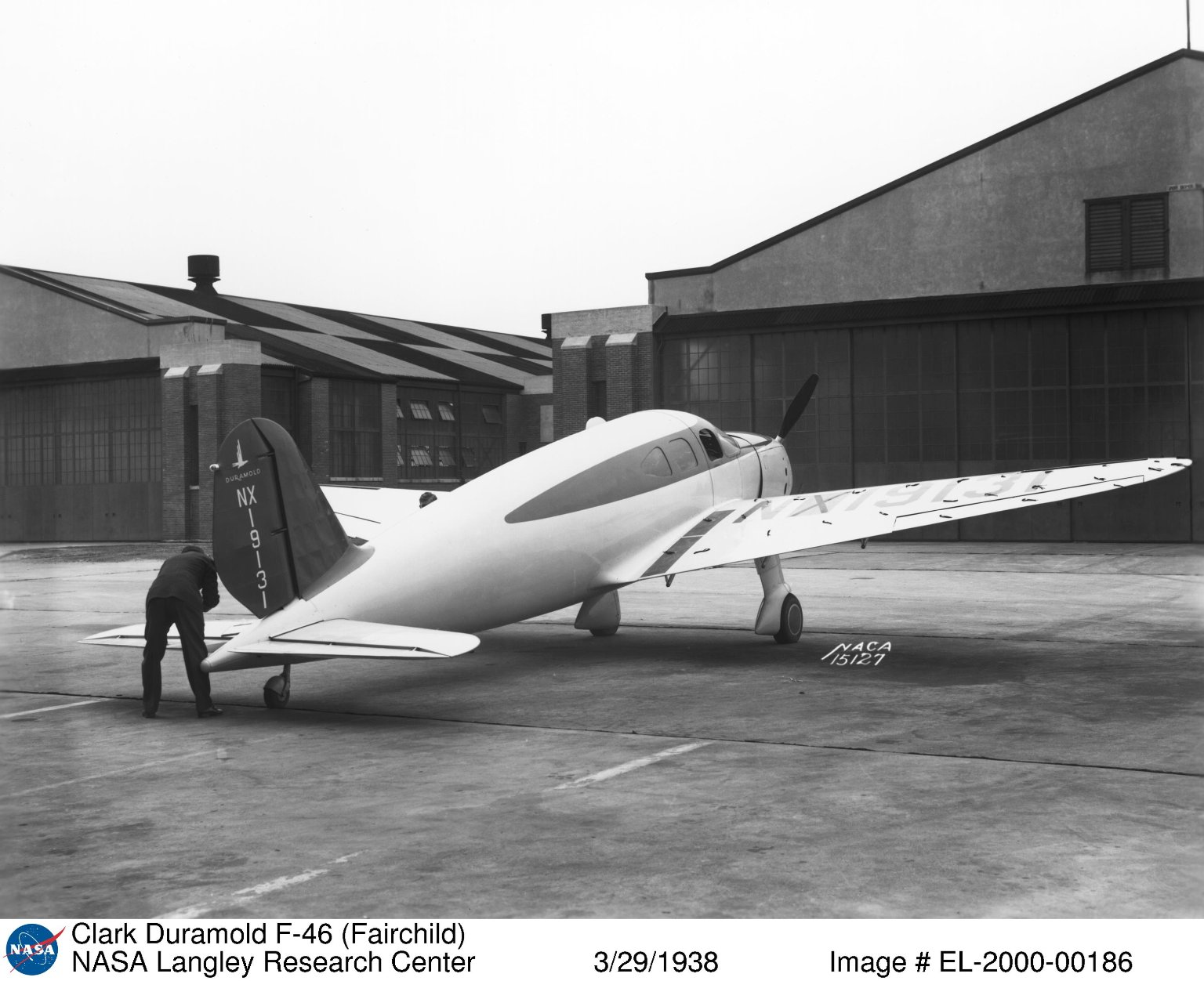
Fairchild F-46

Ray Greene of Owens Corning is credited with producing the first composite boat in 1937, but did not proceed further at the time due to the brittle nature of the plastic used. In 1939, Russia was reported to have constructed a passenger boat of plastic materials, and the United States a fuselage and wings of an aircraft. The first car to have a fibre-glass body was the 1946 Stout Scarab. Only one of this model was built. The Ford prototype of 1941 could have been the first plastic car, but there is some uncertainty around the materials used as it was destroyed shortly afterwards.

The first fibre-reinforced plastic plane was either the Fairchild F-46, first flown on 12 May 1937, or the Californian built Bennett Plastic Plane. A fibreglass fuselage was used on a modified Vultee BT-13A designated the XBT-16 based at Wright Field in late 1942. In 1943, further experiments were undertaken building structural aircraft parts from composite materials resulting in the first plane, a Vultee BT-15, with a GFRP fuselage, designated the XBT-19, being flown in 1944. A significant development in the tooling for GFRP components had been made by Republic Aviation Corporation in 1943.

Carbon fibre production began in the late 1950s and was used, though not widely in British industry until the early 1960s. Aramid fibres were being produced around this time also, appearing first under the trade name Nomex by DuPont. Today, each of these fibres is used widely in industry for any applications that require plastics with specific strength or elastic qualities. Glass fibres are the most common across all industries, although carbon-fibre and carbon-fibre-aramid composites are widely found in aerospace, automotive and sporting good applications. These three (glass, carbon, and aramid) continue to be the important categories of fibre used in FRP.

Global polymer production on the scale present today began in the mid 20th century, when low material and productions costs, new production technologies and new product categories, combined to make polymer production economical. The industry finally matured in the late 1970s, when world polymer production surpassed that of steel, making polymers the ubiquitous material that they are today. Fibre-reinforced plastics have been a significant aspect of this industry from the beginning.

== Process definition ==
A polymer is generally manufactured by step-growth polymerisation or addition polymerisation. When one or more polymers are combined with various agents to enhance or in any way alter their material properties, the result is referred to as a plastic. Composite plastics refers to those types of plastics that result from bonding two or more homogeneous materials with different material properties to derive a final product with certain desired material and mechanical properties. Fibre-reinforced plastics are a category of composite plastics that specifically use fibre materials to mechanically enhance the strength and elasticity of plastics.

The original plastic material without fibre reinforcement is known as the matrix or binding agent. The matrix is a tough but relatively weak plastic that is reinforced by stronger stiffer reinforcing filaments or fibres. The extent that strength and elasticity are enhanced in a fibre-reinforced plastic depends on the mechanical properties of both the fibre and matrix, their volume relative to one another, and the fibre length and orientation within the matrix. Reinforcement of the matrix occurs by definition when the FRP material exhibits increased strength or elasticity relative to the strength and elasticity of the matrix alone.

== Process description ==
FRP involves two distinct processes, the first is the process whereby the fibrous material is manufactured and formed, the second is the process whereby fibrous materials are bonded with the matrix during moulding.

=== Fibre ===
==== Manufacture of fibre fabric ====
Reinforcing Fibre is manufactured in both two-dimensional and three-dimensional orientations:

1. Two-dimensional fibre glass-reinforced polymer is characterised by a laminated structure in which the fibres are only aligned along the plane in x-direction, and y-direction of the material. This means that no fibres are aligned in the through-thickness or the z-direction, this lack of alignment in the through thickness can create a disadvantage in cost and processing. Costs and labour increase because conventional processing techniques used to fabricate composites, such as wet hand lay-up, autoclave and resin transfer moulding, require a high amount of skilled labour to cut, stack and consolidate into a preformed component.
2. Three-dimensional fibreglass-reinforced polymer composites are materials with three-dimensional fibre structures that incorporate fibres in the x-direction, y-direction and z-direction. The development of three-dimensional orientations arose from industry's need to reduce fabrication costs, to increase through-thickness mechanical properties, and to improve impact damage tolerance; all were problems associated with two-dimensional fibre-reinforced polymers.

==== Manufacture of fibre preforms ====
Fibre preforms are how the fibres are manufactured before being bonded to the matrix. Fibre preforms are often manufactured in sheets, continuous mats, or as continuous filaments for spray applications. The four major ways to manufacture the fibre preform is through the textile processing techniques of weaving, knitting, braiding and stitching.

1. Weaving can be done in a conventional manner to produce two-dimensional fibres as well as in a multilayer weaving that can create three-dimensional fibres. However, multilayer weaving requires multiple layers of warp yarns to create fibres in the z-direction, creating a few disadvantages in manufacturing, namely the time to set up all the warp yarns on the loom. Therefore, most multilayer weaving is currently used to produce relatively narrow width products, or high value products where the cost of the preform production is acceptable. Another one of the main problems facing the use of multilayer woven fabrics is the difficulty in producing a fabric that contains fibres oriented at other than right angles to each other.
2. The second major way of manufacturing fibre preforms is Braiding. Braiding is suited to the manufacture of narrow width flat or tubular fabric and is not as capable as weaving in the production of large volumes of wide fabrics. Braiding is done over top of mandrels that vary in cross-sectional shape or dimension along their length. Braiding is limited to objects about a brick in size. Unlike standard weaving, braiding can produce fabric that contains fibres at 45-degree angles to one another. Braiding three-dimensional fibres can be done using four-step, two-step or Multilayer Interlock Braiding. Four-step or row and column braiding utilises a flat bed containing rows and columns of yarn carriers that form the shape of the desired preform. Additional carriers are added to the outside of the array, the precise location and quantity of which depends upon the exact preform shape and structure required. There are four separate sequences of row and column motion, which act to interlock the yarns and produce the braided preform. The yarns are mechanically forced into the structure between each step to consolidate the structure, as a reed is used in weaving. Two-step braiding is unlike the four-step process because the two-step process includes a large number of yarns fixed in the axial direction and a lesser number of braiding yarns. The process consists of two steps in which the braiding carriers move completely through the structure between the axial carriers. This relatively simple sequence of motions is capable of forming preforms of essentially any shape, including circular and hollow shapes. Unlike the four-step process, the two-step process does not require mechanical compaction: the motions involved in the process allows the braid to be pulled tight by yarn tension alone. The last type of braiding is multi-layer interlocking braiding that consists of a number of standard circular braiders being joined to form a cylindrical braiding frame. This frame has a number of parallel braiding tracks around the circumference of the cylinder but the mechanism allows the transfer of yarn carriers between adjacent tracks forming a multilayer braided fabric with yarns interlocking to adjacent layers. The multilayer interlock braid differs from both the four-step and two-step braids in that the interlocking yarns are primarily in the plane of the structure and thus do not significantly reduce the in-plane properties of the preform. The four-step and two-step processes produce a greater degree of interlinking as the braiding yarns travel through the thickness of the preform, but therefore contribute less to the in-plane performance of the preform. A disadvantage of the multilayer interlock equipment is that due to the conventional sinusoidal movement of the yarn carriers to form the preform, the equipment is not able to have the density of yarn carriers that is possible with the two-step and four-step machines.
3. Knitting fibre preforms can be done with the traditional methods of Warp and [Weft] Knitting, and the fabric produced is often regarded by many as two-dimensional fabric, but machines with two or more needle beds are capable of producing multilayer fabrics with yarns that traverse between the layers. Developments in electronic controls for needle selection and knit loop transfer, and in the sophisticated mechanisms that allow specific areas of the fabric to be held and their movement controlled, have allowed the fabric to be formed into the required three-dimensional preform shape with a minimum of material wastage.
4. Stitching is arguably the simplest of the four main textile manufacturing techniques and one that can be performed with the smallest investment in specialised machinery. Basically stitching consists of inserting a needle, carrying the stitch thread, through a stack of fabric layers to form a 3D structure. The advantages of stitching are that it is possible to stitch both dry and prepreg fabric, although the tackiness of the prepreg makes the process difficult and generally creates more damage within the prepreg material than in the dry fabric. Stitching also utilises the standard two-dimensional fabrics that are commonly in use within the composite industry, so there is a sense of familiarity with the material systems. The use of standard fabric also allows a greater degree of flexibility in the fabric lay-up of the component than is possible with the other textile processes, which have restrictions on the fibre orientations that can be produced.

=== Forming processes ===
A rigid structure is usually used to establish the shape of FRP components. Parts can be laid up on a flat surface referred to as a "caul plate" or on a cylindrical structure referred to as a "mandrel". However, most fibre-reinforced plastic parts are created with a mould or "tool". Moulds can be concave female moulds, male moulds, or the mould can completely enclose the part with a top and bottom mould.

The moulding processes of FRP plastics begins by placing the fibre preform on or in the mould. The fibre preform can be dry fibre, or fibre that already contains a measured amount of resin called "prepreg". Dry fibres are "wetted" with resin either by hand or the resin is injected into a closed mould. The part is then cured, leaving the matrix and fibres in the shape created by the mould. Heat and/or pressure are sometimes used to cure the resin and improve the quality of the final part.

The different methods of forming are listed below.

==== Bladder moulding ====
Individual sheets of prepreg material are laid up and placed in a female-style mould along with a balloon-like bladder. The mould is closed and placed in a heated press. Finally, the bladder is pressurised forcing the layers of material against the mould walls.

==== Compression moulding ====
When the raw material (plastic block, rubber block, plastic sheet, or granules) contains reinforcing fibres, a compression moulded part qualifies as a fibre-reinforced plastic. More typically the plastic preform used in compression moulding does not contain reinforcing fibres. In compression moulding, a "preform" or "charge", of SMC, BMC is placed into mould cavity. The mould is closed and the material is formed and cured inside by pressure and heat. Compression moulding offers excellent detailing for geometric shapes ranging from pattern and relief detailing to complex curves and creative forms, to precision engineering all within a maximum curing time of 20 minutes.

==== Autoclave and vacuum bag ====
Individual sheets of prepreg material are laid-up and placed in an open mould. The material is covered with release film, bleeder/breather material and a vacuum bag. A vacuum is pulled on part and the entire mould is placed into an autoclave (heated pressure vessel). The part is cured with a continuous vacuum to extract entrapped gasses from laminate. This is a very common process in the aerospace industry because it affords precise control over moulding due to a long, slow cure cycle that is anywhere from one to several hours. This precise control creates the exact laminate geometric forms needed to ensure strength and safety in the aerospace industry, but it is also slow and labour-intensive, meaning costs often confine it to the aerospace industry.

==== Mandrel wrapping ====
Sheets of prepreg material are wrapped around a steel or aluminium mandrel. The prepreg material is compacted by nylon or polypropylene cello tape. Parts are typically batch cured by vacuum bagging and hanging in an oven. After cure, the cello and mandrel are removed leaving a hollow carbon tube. This process creates strong and robust hollow carbon tubes.

==== Wet layup ====
Wet layup forming combines fibre reinforcement and the matrix as they are placed on the forming tool. Reinforcing fibre layers are placed in an open mould and then saturated with a wet resin by pouring it over the fabric and working it into the fabric. The mould is then left so that the resin will cure, usually at room temperature, though heat is sometimes used to ensure a proper cure. Sometimes a vacuum bag is used to compress a wet layup. Glass fibres are most commonly used for this process, the results are widely known as fibreglass, and is used to make common products like skis, canoes, kayaks and surf boards.

==== Chopper gun ====
Continuous strands of fibreglass are pushed through a hand-held gun that both chops the strands and combines them with a catalysed resin such as polyester. The impregnated chopped glass is shot onto the mould surface in whatever thickness and design the human operator thinks is appropriate. This process is good for large production runs at economical cost, but produces geometric shapes with less strength than other moulding processes and has poor dimensional tolerance.

==== Filament winding ====
Machines pull fibre bundles through a wet bath of resin and wound over a rotating steel mandrel in specific orientations. Parts are cured either room temperature or elevated temperatures. Mandrel is extracted, leaving a final geometric shape but can be left in some cases.

==== Pultrusion ====
Fibre bundles and slit fabrics are pulled through a wet bath of resin and formed into the rough part shape. Saturated material is extruded from a heated closed die curing while being continuously pulled through die. Some of the end products of pultrusion are structural shapes, i.e. I beam, angle, channel and flat sheet. These materials can be used to create all sorts of fibreglass structures such as ladders, platforms, handrails, pipes, and pump supports.

==== Resin transfer moulding ====
Also called resin infusion. Fabrics are placed into a mould into which wet resin is then injected. Resin is typically pressurised and forced into a cavity which is under vacuum in resin transfer moulding. Resin is entirely pulled into cavity under vacuum in vacuum-assisted resin transfer moulding. This moulding process allows precise tolerances and detailed shaping, but can sometimes fail to fully saturate the fabric leading to weak spots in the final shape.

== Advantages and limitations ==
FRP allows the alignment of the glass fibres of thermoplastics to suit specific design programs. Specifying the orientation of reinforcing fibres can increase the strength and resistance to deformation of the polymer. Glass reinforced polymers are strongest and most resistive to deforming forces when the polymers fibres are parallel to the force being exerted, and are weakest when the fibres are perpendicular. This alignment significantly enhances the tensile strength of the material along the fibre direction, making it ideal for load-bearing applications where directional strength is critical. Thus, this ability is at once both an advantage or a limitation depending on the context of use. Weak spots of perpendicular fibres can be used for natural hinges and connections, but can also lead to material failure when production processes fail to properly orient the fibres parallel to expected forces. When forces are exerted perpendicular to the orientation of fibres, the strength and elasticity of the polymer is less than the matrix alone. In cast resin components made of glass reinforced polymers such as UP and EP, the orientation of fibres can be oriented in two-dimensional and three-dimensional weaves. This means that when forces are possibly perpendicular to one orientation, they are parallel to another orientation; this eliminates the potential for weak spots in the polymer.

=== Failure modes ===
Structural failure can occur in FRP materials when:

- Tensile forces stretch the matrix more than the fibres, causing the material to shear at the interface between matrix and fibres.
- Tensile forces near the end of the fibres exceed the tolerances of the matrix, separating the fibres from the matrix.
- Tensile forces can also exceed the tolerances of the fibres causing the fibres themselves to fracture leading to material failure.

== Failure Mechanisms ==
FRP composites can exhibit both micro-structural and macroscopic damage:

Micro-structural Damage

- Matrix micro-cracks, which are small cracks that form in the polymer matrix.
- Fibre-matrix debonding, which is when the reinforcing fibre and the matrix separate, indicating failure at the interface.
- Fibre breakage, which is the fracture of the fibres within the matrix.
- Crack coupling which is the interaction of multiple cracks within the materials as a whole.

Macroscopic Damage

- Transverse cracks that occur perpendicular to the direction of the reinforcing fibres.
- Shear failure of the fibre bundles.
- Cracks in the matrix.
- Delamination between fibre bundles in a composite laminate.
- Tensile failure of fibre bundles,
- Final fracture.

Load Orientation

The type of load and its orientation with respect to the fibres affect what failure mechanisms are favoured.

- Low-angle impact: Favours abrasive wear that leads to surface wrinkling, increased roughness, and long cracks. Material shedding results after the resulting cracks link.
- High-angle impact: Favours impact damage that leads to smaller cracks.
- Compressive Loads: Channels created by fibre bundles act as critical damage points. Under compression, the fibres begin to buckle which can result in diagonal shear, or net compression depending on the orientation of the fibres.

Failure Initiation

The sequence of failure initiation in composite laminates is highly variable, depending on the specific material system and the applied loading conditions. Damage growth can be initiated by either matrix-dominated or fibre-dominated failure mechanisms. However, the interface between layers often serves as a weak link; delamination is a common failure mode because interlaminar strength is typically the lowest in a laminated material, suggesting the interface is frequently the first to fail.

Observed sequences of failure initiation provide further insight. Generally, the initial deterioration of composites under repeated loading often appears as a gradual loss of stiffness, which is attributed to failure or breakdown within the resin. In adhesive joints, fracture can begin as debonding at the adhesive/adherend interface, fibre peel-off from the outermost lamina, or intra- or inter-laminar debonding within the composite adherends. It is notable that the relationship between resistance change and debonded area in these joints may not be unique when various micromechanisms are competing.

Under tensile loading in microvascular composites, fibre damage in the 0° layers can initiate first, followed by resin damage in the 90° layers. In carbon-fibre reinforced polymer laminated plates subjected to tensile loading, the typical sequence observed is matrix tensile damage and microcrack formation in 90° plies, which then leads to delamination between plies, and ultimately, tensile failure of fibres in 0° plies. Furthermore, ply cracking, where transverse stresses exceed the ply's capacity, can sometimes trigger subsequent delamination. A broken fibre can also initiate a transverse crack, which then contributes to reducing the overall transverse strength of the material.

== Material requirements ==
A thermoset polymer matrix material, or engineering grade thermoplastic polymer matrix material, must meet certain requirements in order to first be suitable for FRPs and ensure a successful reinforcement of itself. The matrix must be able to properly saturate, and preferably bond chemically with the fibre reinforcement for maximum adhesion within a suitable curing period. The matrix must also completely envelop the fibres to protect them from cuts and notches that would reduce their strength, and to transfer forces to the fibres. The fibres must also be kept separate from each other so that if failure occurs it is localised as much as possible, and if failure occurs the matrix must also debond from the fibre for similar reasons. Finally, the matrix should be of a plastic that remains chemically and physically stable during and after the reinforcement and moulding processes. To be suitable as reinforcement material, fibre additives must increase the tensile strength and modulus of elasticity of the matrix and meet the following conditions; fibres must exceed critical fibre content; the strength and rigidity of fibres itself must exceed the strength and rigidity of the matrix alone; and there must be optimum bonding between fibres and matrix

=== Glass fibre ===
"Fibreglass reinforced plastics" or FRPs (commonly referred to simply as fibreglass) use textile grade glass fibres. These textile fibres are different from other forms of glass fibres used to deliberately trap air, for insulating applications (see glass wool). Textile glass fibres begin as varying combinations of SiO_{2}, Al_{2}O_{3}, B_{2}O_{3}, CaO, or MgO in powder form. These mixtures are then heated through direct melting to temperatures around 1300 degrees Celsius, after which dies are used to extrude filaments of glass fibre in diameter ranging from 9 to 17 μm. These filaments are then wound into larger threads and spun onto bobbins for transportation and further processing. Glass fibre is by far the most popular means to reinforce plastic and thus enjoys a wealth of production processes, some of which are applicable to aramid and carbon fibres as well owing to their shared fibrous qualities.

Roving is a process where filaments are spun into larger diameter threads. These threads are then commonly used for woven reinforcing glass fabrics and mats, and in spray applications.

Fibre fabrics (glass cloth, etc.) are web-form fabric reinforcing material that has both warp and weft directions. Fibre mats are web-form non-woven mats of glass fibres. Mats are manufactured in cut dimensions with chopped fibres, or in continuous mats using continuous fibres. Chopped fibre glass is used in processes where lengths of glass threads are cut between 3 and 26 mm, threads are then used in plastics most commonly intended for moulding processes. Glass fibre short strands are short 0.2–0.3 mm strands of glass fibres that are used to reinforce thermoplastics most commonly for injection moulding.

=== Carbon fibre ===
Carbon fibres are created when polyacrylonitrile fibres (PAN), Pitch resins, or Rayon are carbonised (through oxidation and thermal pyrolysis) at high temperatures. Through further processes of graphitising or stretching, the fibres strength or elasticity can be enhanced respectively. Carbon fibres are manufactured in diameters analogous to glass fibres with diameters ranging from 4 to 17 μm. These fibres wound into larger threads for transportation and further production processes. Further production processes include weaving or braiding into carbon fabrics, cloths and mats analogous to those described for glass that can then be used in actual reinforcements.

=== Aramid fibre ===
Aramid fibres are most commonly known as Kevlar, Nomex and Technora. Aramids are generally prepared by the reaction between an amine group and a carboxylic acid halide group (aramid);. Commonly, this occurs when an aromatic polyamide is spun from a liquid concentration of sulphuric acid into a crystallised fibre. Fibres are then spun into larger threads in order to weave into large ropes or woven fabrics (aramid). Aramid fibres are manufactured with varying grades based on strength and rigidity, so that the material can be adapted to meet specific design requirements, such as cutting the tough material during manufacture.

== Example polymer and reinforcement combinations ==
Reinforcing material	Most common matrix materials	Properties improved
Glass fibres	UP, EP, PA, PC, POM, PP, PBT, VE	Strength, elasticity, heat resistance
Wood fibres	PE, PP, ABS, HDPE, PLA	Flexural strength, tensile modulus, tensile strength
Carbon and aramid fibres	EP, UP, VE, PA	Elasticity, tensile strength, compression strength, electrical strength.
Inorganic particulates	Semicrystalline thermoplastics, UP	Isotropic shrinkage, abrasion, compression strength
Microspheres	Glass microspheres	Weight reduction relative to solid fillers

== Applications ==
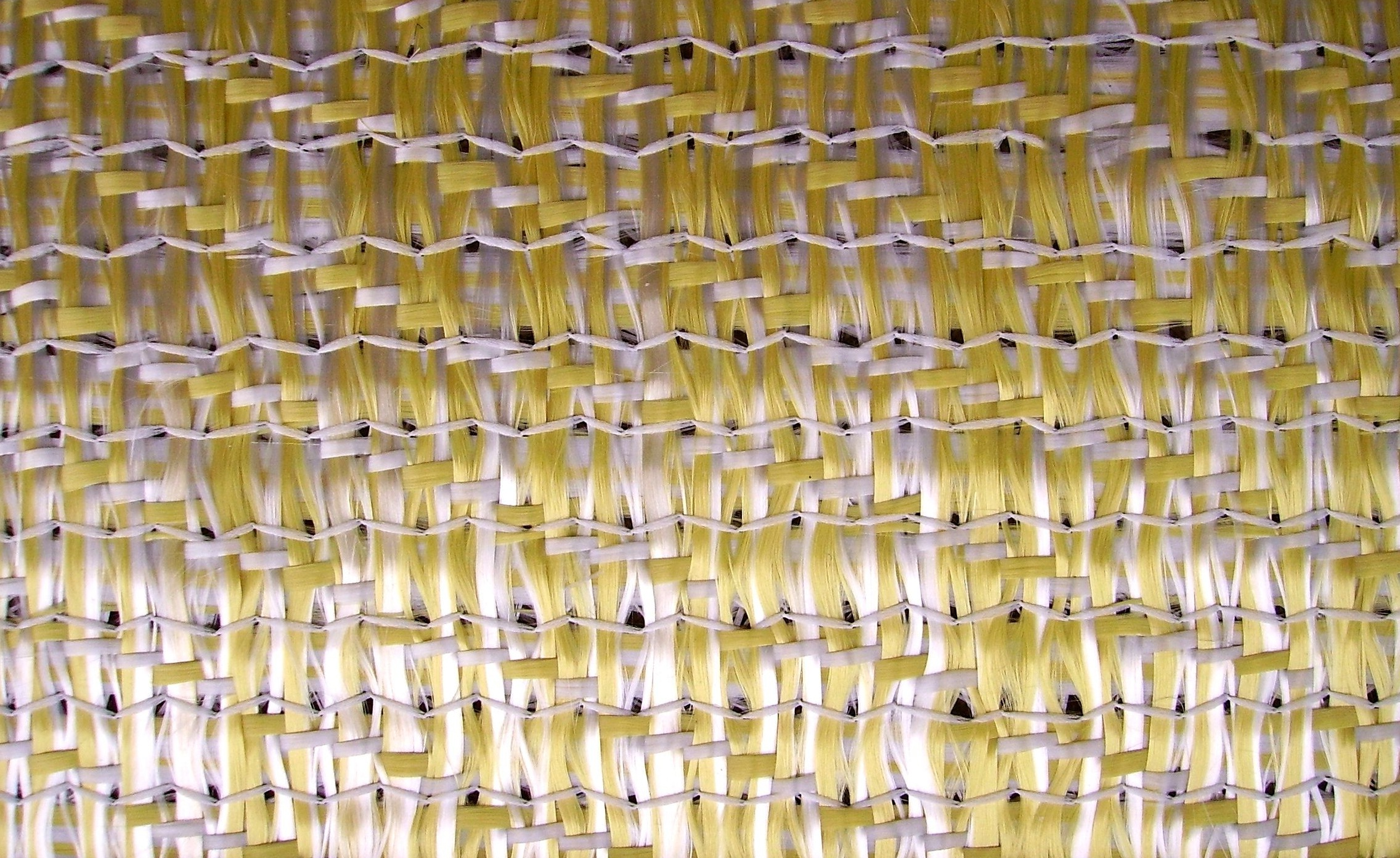
Glass-aramid-hybrid fabric (for high tension and compression)

Fibre-reinforced plastics are best suited for any design program that demands weight savings, precision engineering, definite tolerances, and the simplification of parts in both production and operation. The fibres provide strength and stiffness to the material, while the polymer matrix holds the fibres together and transfers loads between them. FRP composites have a wide range of applications across various industries due to their unique combination of properties, including high strength-to-weight ratio, corrosion resistance, and design flexibility. A moulded polymer product is cheaper, faster, and easier to manufacture than a cast aluminium or steel product, and maintains similar and sometimes better tolerances and material strengths.

=== Carbon-fibre-reinforced polymers ===
Rudder of Airbus A310

- Disadvantages: hazards relating to hail stones, or bird impacts, while aircraft are flying or while on the ground
- Advantages over a traditional rudder made from sheet aluminium are:
  - 25% reduction in weight
  - 95% reduction in components by combining parts and forms into simpler moulded parts.
  - Overall reduction in production and operational costs, economy of parts results in lower production costs and the weight savings create fuel savings that lower the operational costs of flying the aeroplane.

=== Glass-fibre-reinforced polymers ===
Engine intake manifolds are made from glass-fibre-reinforced PA 66.

- Advantages this has over cast aluminium manifolds are:
  - Up to a 60% reduction in weight
  - Improved surface quality and aerodynamics
  - Reduction in components by combining parts and forms into simpler moulded shapes.

Automotive gas and clutch pedals made from glass-fibre-reinforced PA 66 (DWP 12–13)

- Advantages over stamped aluminium are:
  - Pedals can be moulded as single units combining both pedals and mechanical linkages simplifying the production and operation of the design.
  - Fibres can be oriented to reinforce against specific stresses, increasing the durability and safety.

Aluminium windows, doors and façades are thermally insulated by using thermal insulation plastics made of glass fibre reinforced polyamide. In 1977 Ensinger GmbH produced first insulation profile for window systems.

=== Structural applications ===
FRP can be applied to strengthen the beams, columns, and slabs of buildings and bridges. It is possible to increase the strength of structural members even after they have been severely damaged due to loading conditions. In the case of damaged reinforced concrete members, this would first require the repair of the member by removing loose debris and filling in cavities and cracks with mortar or epoxy resin. Once the member is repaired, strengthening can be achieved through wet, hand lay-up of fibre sheets impregnated with epoxy resin, applied to the cleaned and prepared surfaces of the member.

Two techniques are typically adopted for the strengthening of beams, depending on the strength enhancement desired: flexural strengthening or shear strengthening. In many cases it may be necessary to provide both strength enhancements. For the flexural strengthening of a beam, FRP sheets or plates are applied to the tension face of the member (the bottom face for a simply supported member with applied top loading or gravity loading). Principal tensile fibres are oriented parallel to the beam's longitudinal axis, similar to its internal flexural steel reinforcement. This increases the beam strength and its stiffness (load required to cause unit deflection), but decreases the deflection capacity and ductility.

For the shear strengthening of a beam, the FRP is applied on the web (sides) of a member with fibres oriented transverse to the beam's longitudinal axis. Resisting of shear forces is achieved in a similar manner as internal steel stirrups, by bridging shear cracks that form under applied loading. FRP can be applied in several configurations, depending on the exposed faces of the member and the degree of strengthening desired, this includes: side bonding, U-wraps (U-jackets), and closed wraps (complete wraps). Side bonding involves applying FRP to the sides of the beam only. It provides the least amount of shear strengthening due to failures caused by de-bonding from the concrete surface at the FRP free edges. For U-wraps, the FRP is applied continuously in a 'U' shape around the sides and bottom (tension) face of the beam. If all faces of a beam are accessible, the use of closed wraps is desirable as they provide the most strength enhancement. Closed wrapping involves applying FRP around the entire perimeter of the member, such that there are no free ends and the typical failure mode is rupture of the fibres. For all wrap configurations, the FRP can be applied along the length of the member as a continuous sheet or as discrete strips, having a predefined minimum width and spacing.

Slabs may be strengthened by applying FRP strips at their bottom (tension) face. This will result in better flexural performance, since the tensile resistance of the slabs is supplemented by the tensile strength of FRP. In the case of beams and slabs, the effectiveness of FRP strengthening depends on the performance of the resin chosen for bonding. This is particularly an issue for shear strengthening using side bonding or U-wraps. Columns are typically wrapped with FRP around their perimeter, as with closed or complete wrapping. This not only results in higher shear resistance, but more crucial for column design, it results in increased compressive strength under axial loading. The FRP wrap works by restraining the lateral expansion of the column, which can enhance confinement in a similar manner as spiral reinforcement does for the column core.

=== Elevator cable ===
In June 2013, KONE elevator company announced Ultrarope for use as a replacement for steel cables in elevators. It seals the carbon fibres in high-friction polymer. Unlike steel cable, Ultrarope was designed for buildings that require up to 1,000 m (3,300 ft) of lift. Steel elevators top out at 500 m (1,600 ft). The company estimated that in a 500 m (1,600 ft) high building, an elevator would use 15% less electrical power than a steel-cabled version. As of June 2013, the product had passed all European Union and United States certification tests.

== Design considerations ==
FRP is used in designs that require a measure of strength or modulus of elasticity for which non-reinforced plastics and other material choices are ill-suited, either mechanically or economically. The primary design consideration for using FRP is to ensure that the material is used economically and in a manner that takes advantage of its specific structural characteristics, but this is not always the case. The orientation of fibres creates a material weakness perpendicular to the fibres. Thus the use of fibre reinforcement and their orientation affects the strength, rigidity, elasticity and hence the functionality of the final product itself. Orienting the fibres either unidirectionally, 2-dimensionally, or 3-dimensionally during production affects the strength, flexibility, and elasticity of the final product. Fibres oriented in the direction of applied forces display greater resistance to distortion from these forces, thus areas of a product that must withstand forces will be reinforced with fibres oriented parallel to the forces, and areas that require flexibility, such as natural hinges, will have fibres oriented perpendicular to the forces.

Orienting the fibres in more dimensions avoids this either-or scenario and creates objects that seek to avoid any specific weakness due to the unidirectional orientation of fibres. The properties of strength, flexibility and elasticity can also be magnified or diminished through the geometric shape and design of the final product. For example, ensuring proper wall thickness and creating multifunctional geometric shapes that can be moulded as a single piece enhances the material and structural integrity of the product by reducing the requirements for joints, connections, and hardware.

=== Disposal and recycling concerns ===
As a subset of plastic, FR plastics are liable to a number of the issues and concerns in plastic waste disposal and recycling. Plastics pose a particular challenge in recycling because they are derived from polymers and monomers that often cannot be separated and returned to their virgin states. For this reason not all plastics can be recycled for re-use, in fact some estimates claim only 20–30% of plastics can be recycled at all. Fibre-reinforced plastics and their matrices share these disposal and environmental concerns. Investigation of safe disposal methods has led to two main variations involving the application of intense heat: in one binding agents are burned off—in the process recapturing some of the sunk material cost in the form of heat—and incombustible elements captured by filtration; in the other the incombustible material is burned in a cement kiln, the fibres becoming an integral part of the resulting cast material. In addition to concerns regarding safe disposal, the fact that the fibres themselves are difficult to remove from the matrix and preserve for re-use means FRP's amplify these challenges. FRP's are inherently difficult to separate into base materials, that is into fibre and matrix, and the matrix is difficult to separate into usable plastics, polymers, and monomers. These are all concerns for environmentally-informed design today. Plastics do often offer savings in energy and economic savings in comparison to other materials. In addition, with the advent of new more environmentally friendly matrices such as bioplastics and UV-degradable plastics, FRP will gain environmental sensitivity.

== See also ==
- Long-fibre-reinforced thermoplastic
- Pre-preg
- Composite material
- Lignocellulosic filler reinforced polymer
