= Oxazines =

E heterocyclic organic compounds containing one oxygen and one nitrogen atom

The 8 isomers of oxazine

Oxazines are heterocyclic organic compounds containing one oxygen and one nitrogen atom in a cyclohexa-1,4-diene ring (a doubly unsaturated six-membered ring). Isomers exist depending on the relative position of the heteroatoms and relative position of the double bonds.

By extension, the derivatives are also referred to as oxazines; examples include ifosfamide and morpholine (tetrahydro-1,4-oxazine). A commercially available dihydro-1,3-oxazine is a reagent in the Meyers synthesis of aldehydes. Fluorescent dyes such as Nile red and Nile blue are based on the aromatic compound benzophenoxazine. Cinnabarine and cinnabaric acid are two naturally occurring dioxazines, being derived from biodegradation of tryptophan.

== Dioxazines ==
Dioxazines are pentacyclic compounds consisting of two oxazine subunits. A commercially important example is the pigment pigment violet 23.

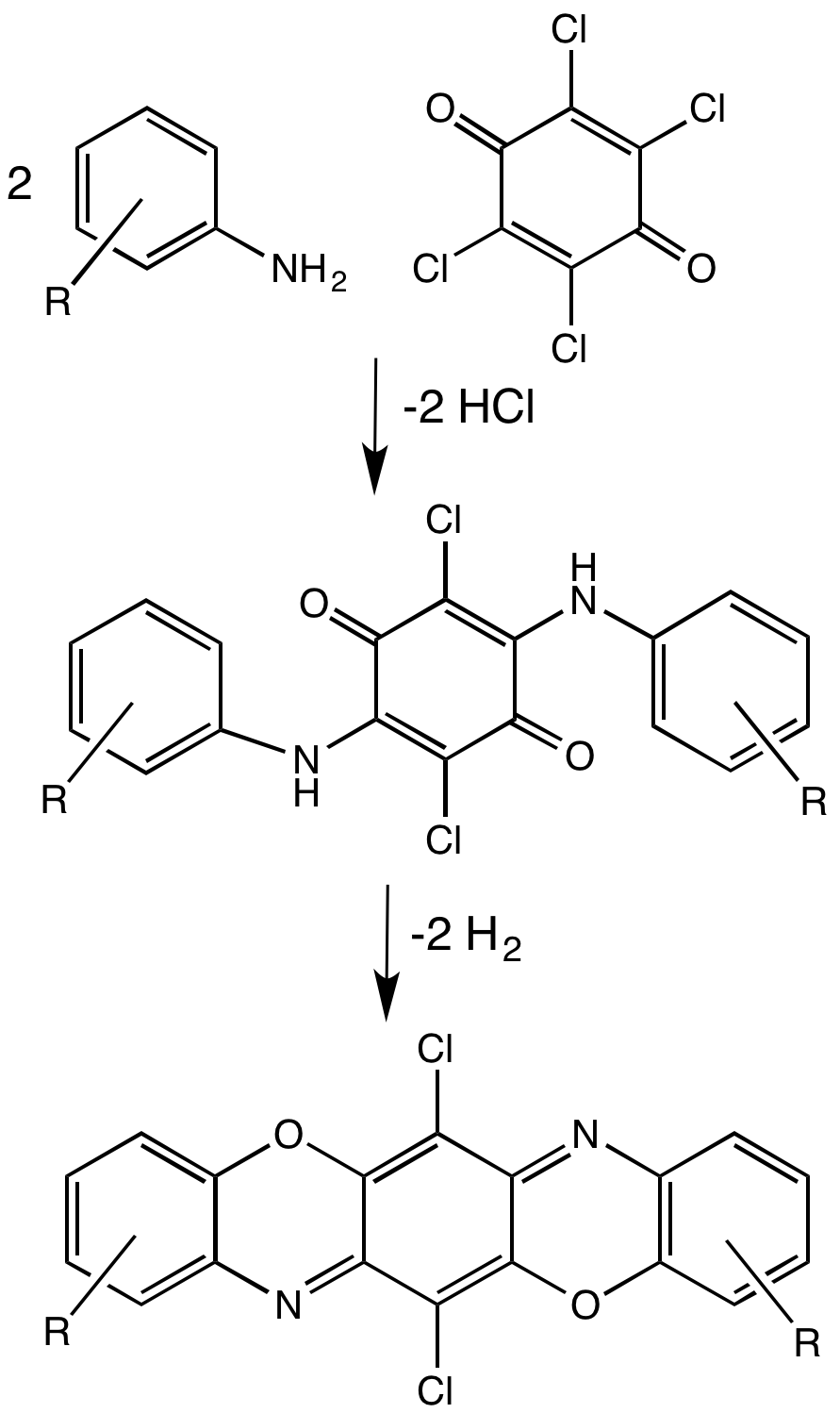
Synthetic route to dioxazine dyes.

== Benzoxazines ==
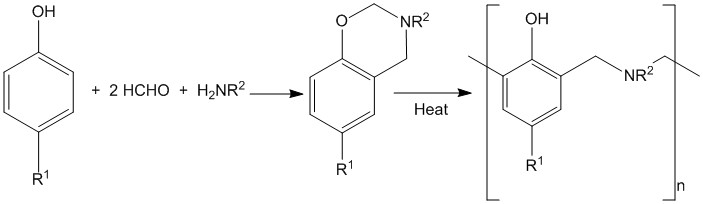
Benzoxazine resin synthetic pathway, structure and cure mechanism

Benzoxazines are bicyclic compounds formed by the ring fusion of a benzene ring with an oxazine. Polybenzoxazines are a class of polymers formed by the reaction of phenols, formaldehyde, and primary amines which on heating to ~200 °C (~400 °F) polymerise to produce polybenzoxazine networks. The resulting high molecular weight thermoset polymer matrix composites are used where enhanced mechanical performance, flame and fire resistance compared to epoxy and phenolic resins is required.

== Physical properties ==
Oxazine dyes exhibit solvatochromism.

== Images ==
Morpholine

Phenoxazine

Pigment violet 23 is a commercially useful pigment.
