= Bulk moulding compound =

Glass-fiber polymer

Bulk moulding compound (BMC), bulk moulding composite, or dough moulding compound (DMC), is a ready-to-mold, glass-fiber reinforced thermoset polymer material primarily used in compression moulding, as well as in injection moulding and transfer moulding. Typical applications include demanding electrical applications, corrosion resistant needs, appliance, automotive, and transit.

== Manufacturing ==
BMC is manufactured by mixing strands (Greater than 1/8” and less than 2") of chopped glass fibers, styrene, an initiator, and filler in a mixer with an unsaturated thermoset resin (commonly polyester resin, vinyl ester resin or epoxy resin). The mixing is done at room temperature and stored at low temperatures to slow down curing prior to molding. The concentration of the mixture can vary depending on application, but is typically 30% glass fibers, 25% filler, and 45% resin, styrene, and initiator. The material is provided in bulk or in logs approximately 4" in diameter. The glass fibers in BMC increase the strength properties of the product to be higher than standard thermoplastic products.

The viscosity of BMC dictates how effectively it can fill a mold. When at high viscosity, the pressure applied to the BMC is not enough for it to flow, and when at low viscosity, the fibers will stay in one place while the rest of the material flows without them. The viscosity constrains the amount of each component that can be used when mixing BMC. Having a large amount of fibers or longer fibers improves mechanical properties but makes the BMC more viscous. Adding fillers can lower the cost of the BMC or improve a certain property, but causes the BMC to become more viscous. Adding more styrene lowers viscosity but causes the moulded BMC to become brittle. When at an optimal viscosity to allow flow, components made using BMC can be up to 16" in their longest dimension before the components of the mixture begin to separate.

== See also ==
- Sheet moulding compound (SMC)
- Fibre-reinforced plastic
- Thermoset polymer matrix
