= Glass-filled polymer =

Glass-filled polymer (or glass-filled plastic), is a mouldable composite material. It comprises short glass fibers in a matrix of a polymer material. It is used to manufacture a wide range of structural components by injection or compression moulding. It is an ideal glass alternative that offers flexibility in the part, chemical resistance, shatter resistance and overall better durability.

== Materials ==
Either thermoplastic or thermosetting polymers may be used. One of the most widely used thermoplastics is a polyamide polymer nylon.

The first mouldable composite was Bakelite. This used wood flour fibres in phenolic resin as the thermoset polymer matrix. As the fibres were only short this material had relatively low bulk strength, but still improved surface hardness and good mouldability.

A wide range of polymers are now produced in glass-filled varieties, including polyamide (Nylon), acetal homopolymers and copolymers, polyester, polyphenylene oxide (PPO / Noryl), polycarbonate, polyethersulphone

Bulk moulding compound is a pre-mixed material of resin and fibres supplied for moulding. Some are thermoplastic or thermosetting, others are chemically cured and are mixed with a catalyst (polyester) or hardener (epoxy) before moulding.

== Applications ==
Compared to the native polymer, glass-filled materials have improved mechanical properties of rigidity, strength and may also have improved surface hardness.

== Compared to sheet materials ==
Bulk glass filled materials are considered distinct from fibreglass or fibre-reinforced plastic materials. These use a substrate of fabric sheets made from long fibres, draped to shape in a mould and then impregnated with resin. They are usually moulded into shapes made of large but thin sheets. Filled materials, in contrast, are used for applications that are thicker or of varying section and not usually as large as sheet materials.
