= Gelcoat =

Material used for finish on a surface

Gelcoat or gel coat is a material used to provide a high-quality finish on the visible surface of a fibre-reinforced composite. The most common gelcoats are thermosetting polymers based on epoxy or unsaturated polyester resin chemistry. Gelcoats are modified resins which are applied to moulds in the liquid state. They are cured to form crosslinked polymers and are subsequently backed with thermoset polymer matrix composites, which are often mixtures of polyester resin and fiberglass, or epoxy resin, which is most commonly used with carbon fibre for higher specific strength.

The manufactured component, when sufficiently cured and removed from the mould, presents the gelcoated surface. This is usually pigmented to provide a coloured, glossy surface which improves the aesthetic appearance of the article, such as the surface of a boat hull.

Many marine craft and some aircraft are manufactured using composite materials with an outer layer of gelcoat, typically 0.5 mm to 0.8 mm (0.02 in to 0.03 in) thick. Gelcoats are designed to be durable, providing resistance to ultraviolet degradation and hydrolysis.

Specialized gelcoats can be used to manufacture the moulds which in turn are used to manufacture components. These require very high levels of durability to overcome the mechanical and thermal stresses encountered during the curing and demoulding processes. Most fiberglass molds have non-conductive tooling gelcoats that accumulate static electricity, resulting in safety risks and difficulties in handling. Advancements in conductive tooling gelcoates with single wall carbon nanotubes make molds safer and easier to use by reducing dust attraction, combating electric shocks to workers, and eliminating issues with de-molding.

Suitable resin chemistries for the manufacture of gelcoats vary, but the most commonly encountered are unsaturated polyesters or epoxies. Within each of these categories, the resin chemistries are further subdivided.

In addition to any pigment, if necessary a gelcoat will contain a thixotropic additive to assist its tenacity to vertical portions of the mould whilst it cures.

== Sources ==
- Hugo du Plessis (15 July 2013). Fibreglass Boats: Construction, Gel Coat, Stressing, Blistering, Repair, Maintenance. A&C Black. ISBN 978-1-4081-5617-9.
- Penn, W. S. (1966). GRP technology.
