= Phenoxazine =

Names
- Preferred IUPAC name 10H-Phenoxazine

Identifiers
CAS Number	135-67-1
3D model (JSmol)	Interactive image
ChEBI	CHEBI:94057
ChemSpider	60610
ECHA InfoCard	100.004.737
PubChem CID	67278
UNII	C2ZWT499SG
CompTox Dashboard (EPA)	DTXSID10159199
- InChI: InChI=1S/C12H9NO/c1-3-7-11-9(5-1)13-10-6-2-4-8-12(10)14-11/h1-8,13H Key: TZMSYXZUNZXBOL-UHFFFAOYSA-N; InChI=1/C12H9NO/c1-3-7-11-9(5-1)13-10-6-2-4-8-12(10)14-11/h1-8,13H Key: TZMSYXZUNZXBOL-UHFFFAOYAS
- SMILES: c1ccc2c(c1)Nc3ccccc3O2

Properties
Chemical formula	C_{12}H_{9}NO
Molar mass	183.210 g·mol^{−1}
- Except where otherwise noted, data are given for materials in their standard state (at 25 °C [77 °F], 100 kPa). Infobox references

Phenoxazine is a heterocyclic compound. The structure of phenoxazine consists of an oxazine fused to two benzene rings. It occurs as the central core of a number of naturally occurring chemical compounds such as dactinomycin and litmus. The dyes Nile blue and Nile red are also based on a phenoxazine core.

Phenoxazine dyes were once widely used for silk dyeing, but due to their lack of lightfastness they have disappeared over time from the market. However, since their light resistance is significantly better on acrylic fibers, these dyes have experienced a renaissance.

== See also ==
- Phenothiazine
