= LSZH =

LSZH may refer to:

- Zurich Airport, in Switzerland, ICAO airport code LSZH
- Low smoke zero halogen, a material classification for cable jacketing
