= LSOH =

LSOH may stand for:

- The Little Shop of Horrors, a 1960 film directed by Roger Corman which was the inspiration for the stage musical Little Shop of Horrors. A film version of the musical was produced in 1986 by director Frank Oz.
- Low smoke zero halogen, a type of cable jacketing used in the manufacture of industrial and network cabling
