= 2,4-Dihydroxy-1,4-benzoxazin-3-one-glucoside dioxygenase =

Class of enzymes

2,4-dihydroxy-1,4-benzoxazin-3-one-glucoside dioxygenase

Identifiers
- EC no.: 1.14.11.59

Databases
- IntEnz: IntEnz view
- BRENDA: BRENDA entry
- ExPASy: NiceZyme view
- KEGG: KEGG entry
- MetaCyc: metabolic pathway
- PRIAM: profile
- PDB structures: RCSB PDB PDBe PDBsum
Search
- PMC: articles
- PubMed: articles
- NCBI: proteins

2,4-dihydroxy-1,4-benzoxazin-3-one-glucoside dioxygenase (EC 1.14.11.59, BX6 (gene), DIBOA-Glc dioxygenase) is an enzyme with systematic name (2R)-4-hydroxy-3-oxo-3,4-dihydro-2H-1,4-benzoxazin-2-yl beta-D-glucopyranoside:oxygen oxidoreductase (7-hydroxylating). This enzyme catalyses the following chemical reaction

(2R)-4-hydroxy-3-oxo-3,4-dihydro-2H-1,4-benzoxazin-2-yl beta-D-glucopyranoside + 2-oxoglutarate + O_{2} $\rightleftharpoons$ (2R)-4,7-dihydroxy-3-oxo-3,4-dihydro-2H-1,4-benzoxazin-2-yl beta-D-glucopyranoside + succinate + CO_{2} + H_{2}O

The enzyme is involved in the biosynthesis of protective and allelopathic benzoxazinoids in some plants.
