= Polybenzoxazine =

Type of bicyclic heterocyclic monomer

3-Phenyl-2,4-dihydro-1,3-benzoxazine monomer

Names
- IUPAC name 3-Phenyl-2,4-dihydro-1,3-benzoxazine

Identifiers
| CAS Number | monomer: 51287-17-3 |
| 3D model (JSmol) | monomer: Interactive image |
| ChEMBL | monomer: ChEMBL1094604 |
| PubChem CID | monomer: 352915 |
| UNII | monomer: 69EQP78NHR |
| CompTox Dashboard (EPA) | monomer: DTXSID70326481 |
- InChI: InChI=1S/C14H13NO/c1-2-7-13(8-3-1)15-10-12-6-4-5-9-14(12)16-11-15/h1-9H,10-11H2 Key: FMZPVXIKKGVLLV-UHFFFAOYSA-N
- SMILES: monomer: C1C2=CC=CC=C2OCN1C3=CC=CC=C3

Properties
| Chemical formula | C_{14}H_{13}NO |
| Molar mass | 211.264 g·mol^{−1} |

Hazards
- GHS labelling
| Pictograms | (GHS07: Exclamation mark) |
| Signal word | Warning |
| Hazard statements | H315, H317 |
| Precautionary statements | P261, P264, P272, P280, P302+P352, P321, P332+P313, P333+P313, P362, P363, P501 |
- Except where otherwise noted, data are given for materials in their standard state (at 25 °C [77 °F], 100 kPa). Infobox references

Polybenzoxazines, also called benzoxazine resins, are cured polymerization products derived from benzoxazine monomers.

== Monomers ==
Benzoxazines are bicyclic heterocyclic compounds containing one oxygen and one nitrogen atom in a doubly unsaturated six-member ring, specifically a 1,3-oxazine ring, fused with a benzene ring. The systematic IUPAC name of the prototypical unsubstituted monomer is 3,4-dihydro-3-phenyl-2H-1,3-benzoxazine. Benzoxazines are products of condensation between an amine, a phenol and formaldehyde, used to produce thermoset resins or thermosetting polymer. Because of the wide availability and low-cost of starting materials (amines, phenols and formaldehyde), as well as ease of preparation (one-pot reaction) diverse benzoxazines are available. Numerous research focus on the different curing temperature, and polymer properties, such as cross-linking, from benzoxazines derived from substituted phenols.

Commercial benzoxazines by Huntsman are based on bisphenols: bisphenol-A, bisphenol-F, thiodiphenol or dicyclopentadienediphenol.

=== Synthesis ===
Benzoxazines can be prepared by a one-pot process by heating an aromatic amine, a phenol and formaldehyde. Alternatively, they can be prepared sequentially.

=== Curing ===
Curing of benzoxazines takes place by thermal ring-opening polymerisation with or without catalyst. (Catalysts reduce curing temperature.) Benzoxazines can be homopolymerized to yield rigid materials, or can be copolymerized with other monomers to tune properties.

== Polymers ==
The result of heating up benzoxazine monomers is a high molecular weight thermoset polymer matrix. Composites of it are used where enhanced mechanical performance, flame and fire resistance compared to epoxy and phenolic resins is required. Polybenzoxazines are a class of halogen-free high-performance polymers.

The main applications of polybenzoxazines resins are in fibre-reinforced plastic and as adhesives. They are substitutes of epoxy, phenolic and bismaleimide resins. Because of their superior resistance to chemicals, low flammability, and excellent heat stability, they are used for components that are exposed to high temperatures and corrosive media. Examples include chemical and heat resistant coatings, adhesives, prepregs, and encapsulants as well as halogen-free laminates for printed circuit boards. Polybenzoxazines are also used in the automotive and aerospace industries for applications where superior thermal and mechanical properties relative to conventional resins are required.

== Copolymers ==
It has been reported that it is possible to copolymerize benzoxazines with other monomers such as epoxy and urethane. This copolymerization could lead to higher crosslink network density and, consequently, to improvement in properties. In fact, experimental data reveals improvement in thermal properties. Glass transition temperature and degradation were improved by the copolymerization.

=== Advantages ===
- No volatile release during cure
- Viscosities as low as 1000 cP at processing temperatures
- Near zero shrinkage
- Room temperature storage stability
- Gel times of as short as 17 minutes at 155 °C
- Good hydrophobicity
- Gel temperature T_{g} at 140 - 250 °C or higher
- Excellent electrical properties (low dielectric constant and dissipation factors)
- Good chemical resistance

== See also ==
- Thermosetting polymer
- Thermoset polymer matrix
- Plastic
