= Thermosetting polymer =

Polymer obtained by irreversibly hardening (curing) a resin

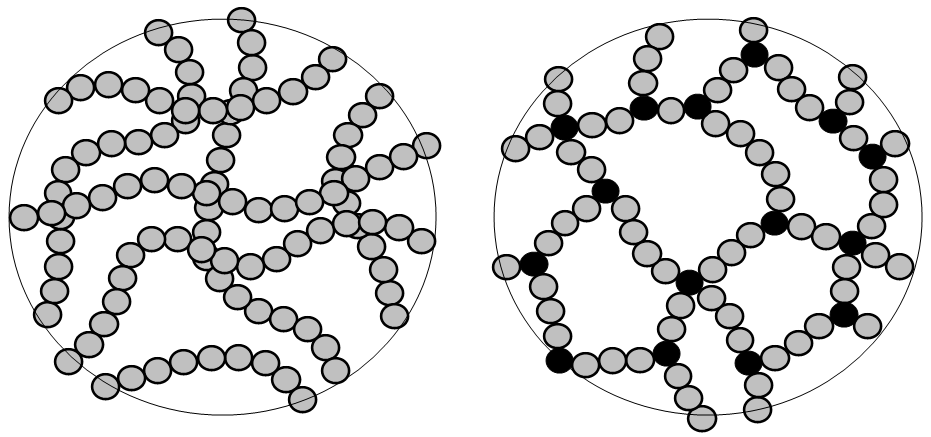
Left: individual linear polymer chains Right: Polymer chains which have been cross linked to give a rigid 3D thermoset polymer

In materials science, a thermosetting polymer, often called a thermoset, is a polymer that is obtained by irreversibly hardening ("curing") a soft solid or viscous liquid prepolymer (resin). Curing is induced by heat or suitable radiation and may be promoted by high pressure or mixing with a catalyst. Heat is not necessarily applied externally, and is often generated by the reaction of the resin with a curing agent (catalyst, hardener). Curing results in chemical reactions that create extensive cross-linking between polymer chains to produce an infusible and insoluble polymer network.

The starting material for making thermosets is usually malleable or liquid prior to curing, and is often designed to be molded into the final shape. It may also be used as an adhesive. Once hardened, a thermoset cannot be melted for reshaping, in contrast to thermoplastic polymers which are commonly produced and distributed in the form of pellets, and shaped into the final product form by melting, pressing, or injection molding.

== Chemical process ==
Curing a thermosetting resin transforms it into a plastic, or elastomer (rubber) by crosslinking or chain extension through the formation of covalent bonds between individual chains of the polymer. Crosslink density varies depending on the monomer or prepolymer mix, and the mechanism of crosslinking:

Acrylic resins, polyesters and vinyl esters with unsaturated sites at the ends or on the backbone are generally linked by copolymerisation with unsaturated monomer diluents, with cure initiated by free radicals generated from ionizing radiation or by the photolytic or thermal decomposition of a radical initiator – the intensity of crosslinking is influenced by the degree of backbone unsaturation in the prepolymer;

Epoxy functional resins can be homo-polymerized with anionic or cationic catalysts and heat, or copolymerised through nucleophilic addition reactions with multifunctional crosslinking agents which are also known as curing agents or hardeners. As reaction proceeds, larger and larger molecules are formed and highly branched crosslinked structures develop, the rate of cure being influenced by the physical form and functionality of epoxy resins and curing agents – elevated temperature postcuring induces secondary crosslinking of backbone hydroxyl functionality which condense to form ether bonds;

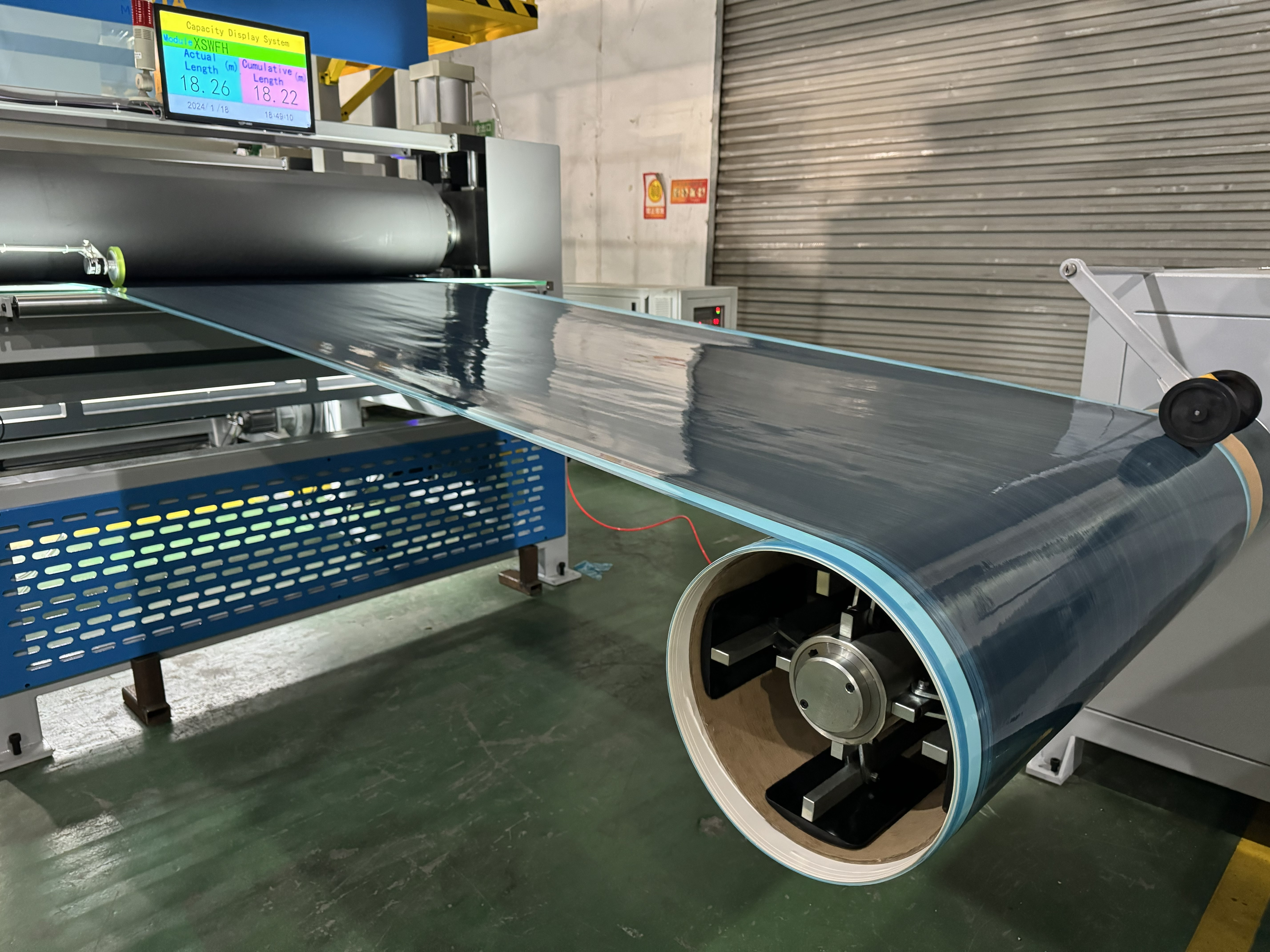
carbon fiber / epoxy thermoset prepreg

Polyurethanes form when isocyanate resins and prepolymers are combined with low- or high-molecular weight polyols, with strict stoichiometric ratios being essential to control nucleophilic addition polymerisation – the degree of crosslinking and resulting physical type (elastomer or plastic) is adjusted from the molecular weight and functionality of isocyanate resins, prepolymers, and the exact combinations of diols, triols and polyols selected, with the rate of reaction being strongly influenced by catalysts and inhibitors; polyureas form virtually instantaneously when isocyanate resins are combined with long-chain amine functional polyether or polyester resins and short-chain diamine extenders – the amine-isocyanate nucleophilic addition reaction does not require catalysts. Polyureas also form when isocyanate resins come into contact with moisture;

Phenolic, amino, and furan resins all cured by polycondensation involving the release of water and heat, with cure initiation and polymerisation exotherm control influenced by curing temperature, catalyst selection or loading and processing method or pressure – the degree of pre-polymerisation and level of residual hydroxymethyl content in the resins determine the crosslink density.

Polybenzoxazines are cured by an exothermal ring-opening polymerisation without releasing any chemical, which translates in near zero shrinkage upon polymerisation.

Thermosetting polymer mixtures based on thermosetting resin monomers and pre-polymers can be formulated and applied and processed in a variety of ways to create distinctive cured properties that cannot be achieved with thermoplastic polymers or inorganic materials.

== Properties ==
Thermosetting plastics are generally stronger than thermoplastic materials due to the three-dimensional network of bonds (crosslinking), and are also better suited to high-temperature applications up to the decomposition temperature since they keep their shape as strong covalent bonds between polymer chains cannot be broken easily. The higher the crosslink density and aromatic content of a thermoset polymer, the higher the resistance to heat degradation and chemical attack. Mechanical strength and hardness also improve with crosslink density, although at the expense of brittleness. They normally decompose before melting.

Hard, plastic thermosets may undergo permanent or plastic deformation under load. Elastomers, which are soft and springy or rubbery and can be deformed and revert to their original shape on loading release.

Conventional thermoset plastics or elastomers cannot be melted and re-shaped after they are cured. This usually prevents recycling for the same purpose, except as filler material. New developments involving thermoset epoxy resins which on controlled and contained heating form crosslinked networks permit repeatedly reshaping, like silica glass by reversible covalent bond exchange reactions on reheating above the glass transition temperature. There are also thermoset polyurethanes shown to have transient properties and which can thus be reprocessed or recycled.

== Fiber-reinforced materials ==
When compounded with fibers, thermosetting resins form fiber-reinforced polymer composites, which are used in the fabrication of factory-finished structural composite OEM or replacement parts, and as site-applied, cured and finished composite repair and protection materials. When used as the binder for aggregates and other solid fillers, they form particulate-reinforced polymer composites, which are used for factory-applied protective coating or component manufacture, and for site-applied and cured construction, or maintenance purposes.

== Materials ==
- Epoxy resin used as the matrix component in many fiber reinforced plastics such as glass-reinforced plastic and graphite-reinforced plastic; casting; electronics encapsulation; construction; protective coatings; adhesives; sealing and joining.
- Polyimides and Bismaleimides used in printed circuit boards and in body parts of modern aircraft, aerospace composite structures, as a coating material and for glass reinforced pipes.
- Cyanate esters or polycyanurates for electronics applications with need for dielectric properties and high glass temperature requirements in aerospace structural composite components.
- Polyester resin fiberglass systems: sheet molding compounds and bulk molding compounds; filament winding; wet lay-up lamination; repair compounds and protective coatings.
- Polyurethanes: insulating foams, mattresses, coatings, adhesives, car parts, print rollers, shoe soles, flooring, synthetic fibers, etc. Polyurethane polymers are formed by combining two bi- or higher functional monomers/oligomers.
- Polyurea/polyurethane hybrids used for abrasion resistant waterproofing coatings.
- Vulcanized rubber.
- Bakelite, a phenol-formaldehyde resin used in electrical insulators and plasticware.
- Duroplast, light but strong material, similar to Bakelite formerly used in the manufacture of the Trabant automobile, currently used for household objects
- Urea-formaldehyde foam used in plywood, particleboard and medium-density fibreboard.
- Melamine resin used on worktop surfaces and some plastic dishes, cutlery and sinks.
- Diallyl phthalate (DAP) used in high temperature and mil-spec electrical connectors and other components. Usually glass filled.
- Epoxy novolac resins used for printed circuit boards, electrical encapsulation, adhesives and coatings for metal.
- Benzoxazines, used alone or hybridised with epoxy and phenolic resins, for structural prepregs, liquid molding and film adhesives for composite construction, bonding and repair.
- Mold or mold runners (the black plastic part in integrated circuits or semiconductors).
- Furan resins used in the manufacture of sustainable biocomposite construction, cements, adhesives, coatings and casting/foundry resins.
- Silicone resins used for thermoset polymer matrix composites and as ceramic matrix composite precursors.
- Thiolyte, an electrical insulating thermoset phenolic laminate material.
- Vinyl ester resins used for wet lay-up laminating, molding and fast setting industrial protection and repair materials.

== Applications ==
Application/process uses and methods for thermosets include protective coating, seamless flooring, civil engineering construction grouts for jointing and injection, mortars, foundry sands, adhesives, sealants, castings, potting, electrical insulation, encapsulation, solid foams, wet lay-up laminating, pultrusion, gelcoats, filament winding, pre-pregs, and molding.

Specific methods of molding thermosets are:

- Reactive injection moulding (used for objects such as milk bottle crates)
- Extrusion molding (used for making pipes, threads of fabric and insulation for electrical cables)
- Compression molding (used to shape SMC and BMC thermosetting plastics)
- Spin casting (used for producing fishing lures and jigs, gaming miniatures, figurines, emblems as well as production and replacement parts)

== See also ==
- Fusion bonded epoxy coating
- Thermoset polymer matrix
- Vulcanization
