= Pigment violet 23 =

Names
- Other names 9,19-Dichloro-5,15-diethyl-5,15-dihydrodiindolo[2,3-c:2',3'-n]triphenodioxazine, C.I. 51319, Carbazole Dioxazine Violet

Identifiers
CAS Number	215247-95-3
3D model (JSmol)	Interactive image
ChemSpider	incorrect linear form: 55316
ECHA InfoCard	100.108.962
EC Number	606-790-9
PubChem CID	20813033
CompTox Dashboard (EPA)	DTXSID501019724
- InChI: InChI=1S/C34H22Cl2N4O2/c1-3-39-19-11-7-5-9-17(19)25-21(39)13-15-23-29(25)37-31-27(35)34-32(28(36)33(31)41-23)38-30-24(42-34)16-14-22-26(30)18-10-6-8-12-20(18)40(22)4-2/h5-16H,3-4H2,1-2H3 Key: GBNIRCSJWYOIHL-UHFFFAOYSA-N
- SMILES: c1cc2N(CC)c3ccc4N=c5c(Cl)c6Oc7c8c9ccccc9N(CC)c8ccc7N=c6c(Cl)c5Oc4c3c2cc1

Properties
Chemical formula	C_{34}H_{22}Cl_{2}N_{4}O_{2}
Molar mass	589.48
Appearance	dark purple solid
Melting point	385 °C
- Except where otherwise noted, data are given for materials in their standard state (at 25 °C [77 °F], 100 kPa). Infobox references

Pigment violet 23 is an organic compound that is a commercial pigment. It is member of the dioxazine family of heterocyclic compounds, but derived from carbazoles. It is prepared by condensation of chloranil and 3-amino-N-ethylcarbazole. It has a centrosymmetric angular structure. For many years, the structure was assigned, incorrectly, as having a "linear structure" (EC no. 228-767-9, CAS RN 6358-30-1) which differ in terms of the carbazole ring fusion.

Pigment violet 23 is prepared by condensation of an aniline with chloranil.

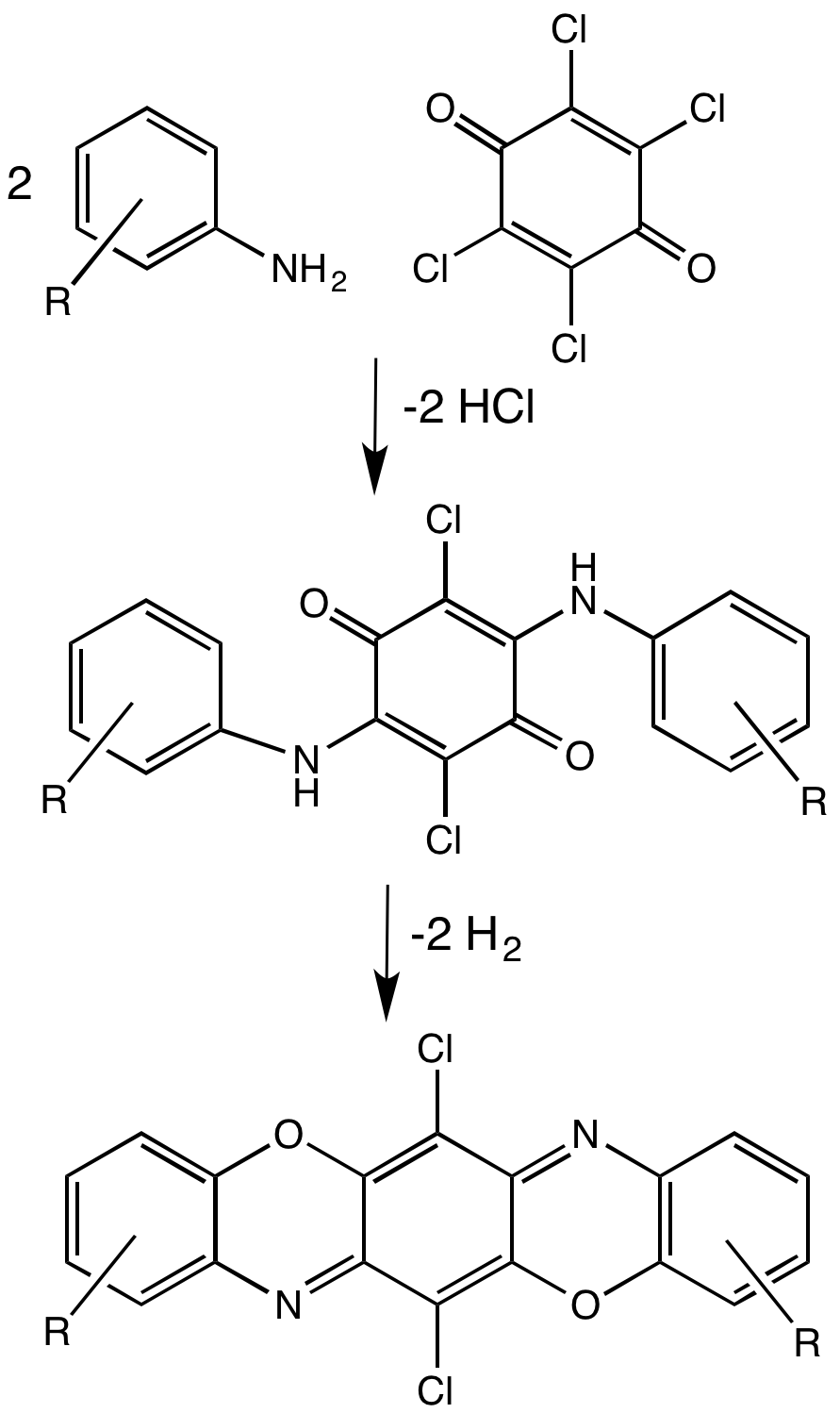
Synthetic route to dioxazine dyes such as pigment violet 23.
