= Matrix molding =

Technique often used during molding

Matrix molding or matrix transfer molding is a technique often used during molding. The person doing the assembly will first create the rigid outer shell or flask, then introduce the softer and more fluid molding material between the shell and the prototype. This process is often used for complex shapes using composites such as with glass and glass/ceramic composites.

== See also ==
- Compression molding
- Injection molding
- Resin Transfer Molding
