= Benzoxazine =

Group of isomeric bicyclic heterocyclic chemical compounds

Chemical structures of several examples of benzoxazine isomers

Benzoxazines are a group of isomeric bicyclic heterocyclic chemical compounds that consist of a benzene ring fused to an oxazine ring. The different isomers depend on the relative positions of the oxygen and nitrogen atoms in the oxazine ring, on the location of ring fusion, and on the position of the double bond in the oxazine ring. They have the molecular formula C_{8}H_{7}NO.

== Preparation ==
1,3-Benzoxazines can be synthesized by the Mannich reaction using a phenol, an amine, and formaldehyde.

== Uses ==
=== Pharmaceutical drugs ===
Benzoxazine rings form the central chemical structure of a number of pharmaceutical drugs including, for example, apararenone, elbasvir, and etifoxine.

=== Polymers ===
Polybenzoxazines, also called benzoxazine resins, are a class of polymers that are produced from the ring-opening polymerization of 3-phenyl-2,4-dihydro-1,3-benzoxazine monomers and its chemical derivatives. The main applications of polybenzoxazines are as adhesives and in fiber-reinforced plastics.
