= Nile blue =

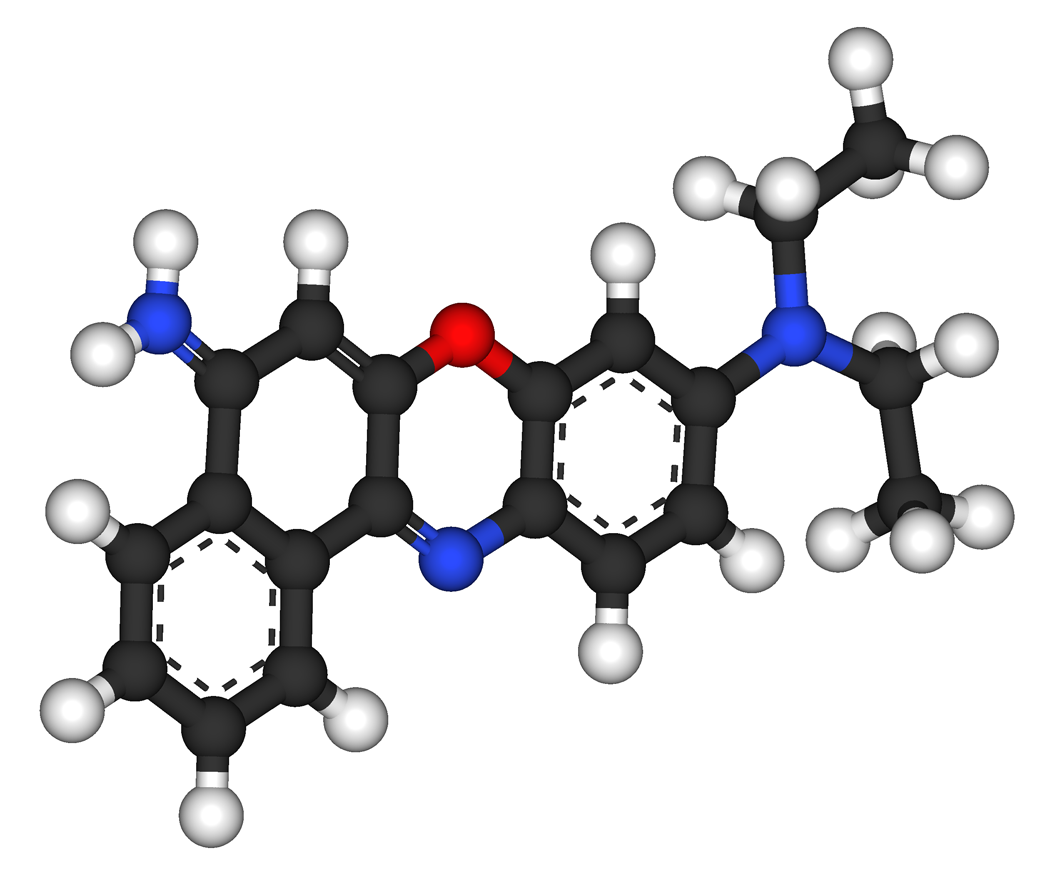

Names
- IUPAC name 9-(diethylamino)-5H-benzo[a]phenoxazin-5-iminium
- Other names Nile blue A, Nile blue sulfate

Identifiers
CAS Number	2381-85-3
3D model (JSmol)	Interactive image
ChEMBL	ion:: ChEMBL1185333; chloride:: ChEMBL407862
ChemSpider	neutral:: 374117
ECHA InfoCard	100.020.757
PubChem CID	19256; ion:: 16939; neutral:: 422690
UNII	E58RL8T2X3
- InChI: InChI=1S/C20H21N3O/c1-3-23(4-2)13-9-10-17-18(11-13)24-19-12-16(21)14-7-5-6-8-15(14)20(19)22-17/h5-13H,3-4,21H2,1-2H3 Key: WOIORDFNOALMFO-UHFFFAOYSA-N; InChI=1/C20H21N3O/c1-3-23(4-2)13-9-10-17-18(11-13)24-19-12-16(21)14-7-5-6-8-15(14)20(19)22-17/h5-13H,3-4,21H2,1-2H3 Key: WOIORDFNOALMFO-UHFFFAOYAF
- SMILES: N=1c3c(OC=2C=1\C=C/C(N(CC)CC)C=2)cc(c4c3cccc4)N

Properties
Chemical formula	C_{20}H_{20}ClN_{3}O
Molar mass	353.845 g/mol
- Except where otherwise noted, data are given for materials in their standard state (at 25 °C [77 °F], 100 kPa). verify (what is ?) Infobox references

Nile blue (or Nile blue A) is a stain used in biology and histology. It may be used with live or fixed cells, and imparts a blue colour to cell nuclei.

It may also be used in conjunction with fluorescence microscopy to stain for the presence of polyhydroxybutyrate granules in prokaryotic or eukaryotic cells. Boiling a solution of Nile blue with sulfuric acid produces Nile red (Nile blue oxazone).

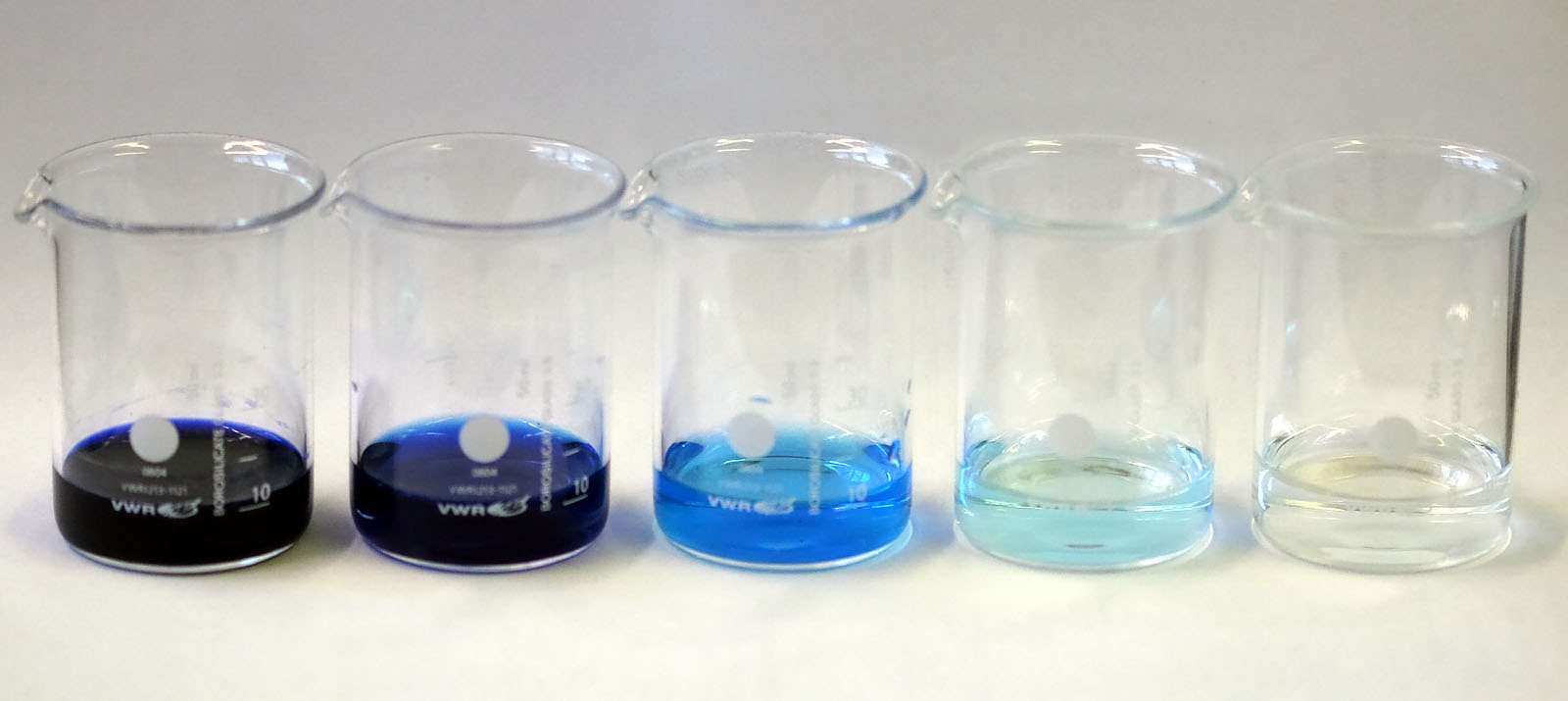
Nile blue hydrochloride in water. Concentrations, left to right: 1000 ppm, 100 ppm, 10 ppm, 1 ppm, 100 ppb.

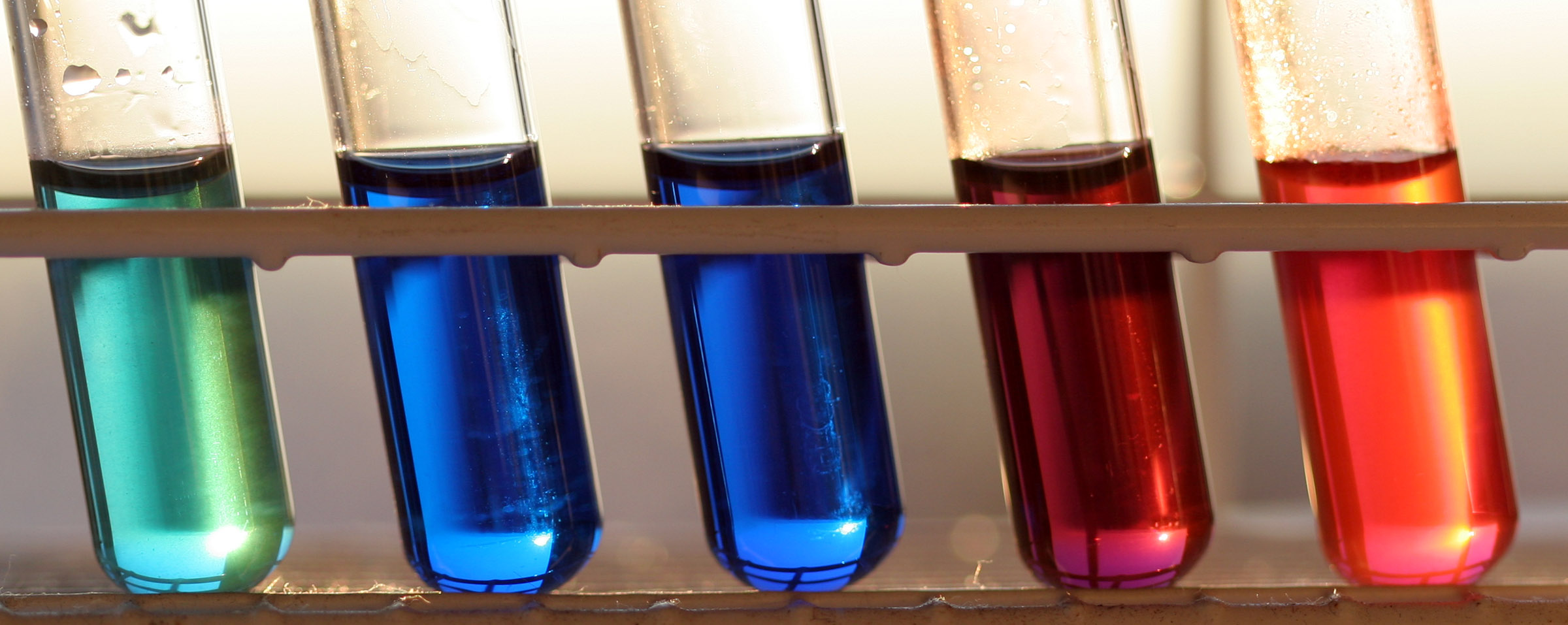
Nile blue in water. Left to right: pH 0, pH 4, pH 7, pH 10, pH 14.

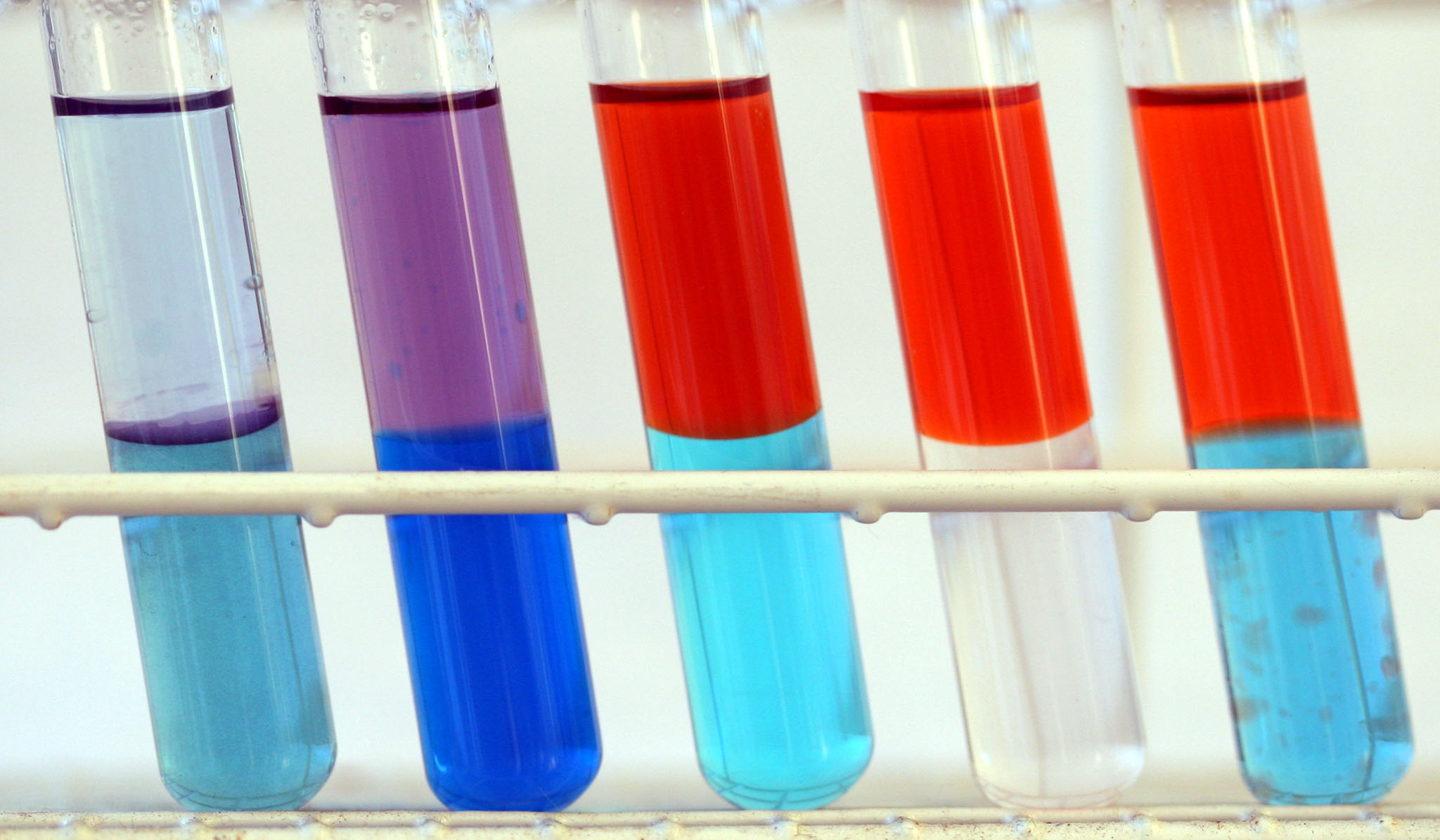
Nile blue in water (lower phase) and ethyl acetate (upper phase) in daylight. Left to right: pH 0, pH 4, pH 7, pH 10, pH 14

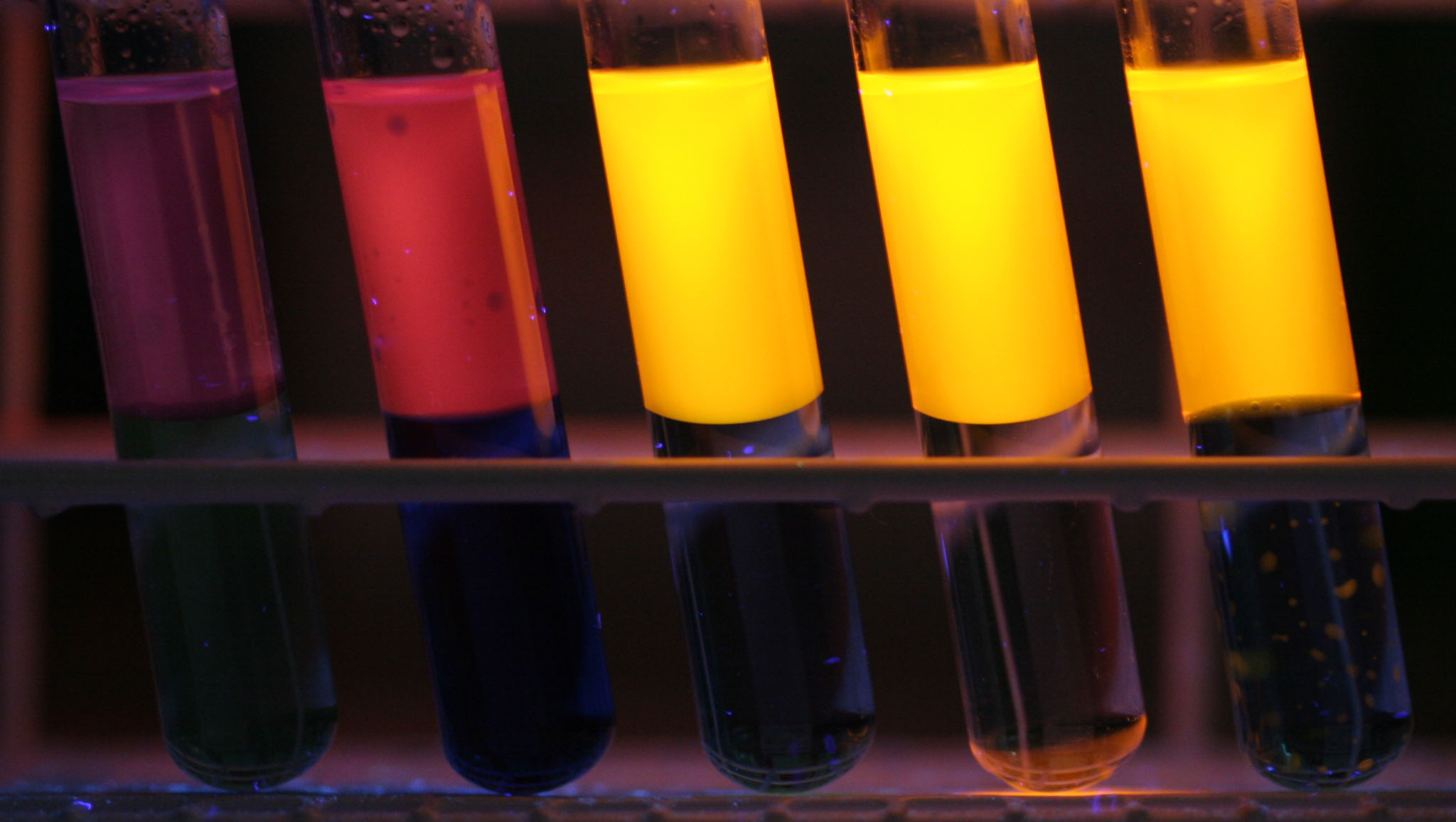
Nile blue in water (lower phase) and ethyl acetate (upper phase) in UV light (366 nm). Left to right: pH 0, pH 4, pH 7, pH 10, pH 14

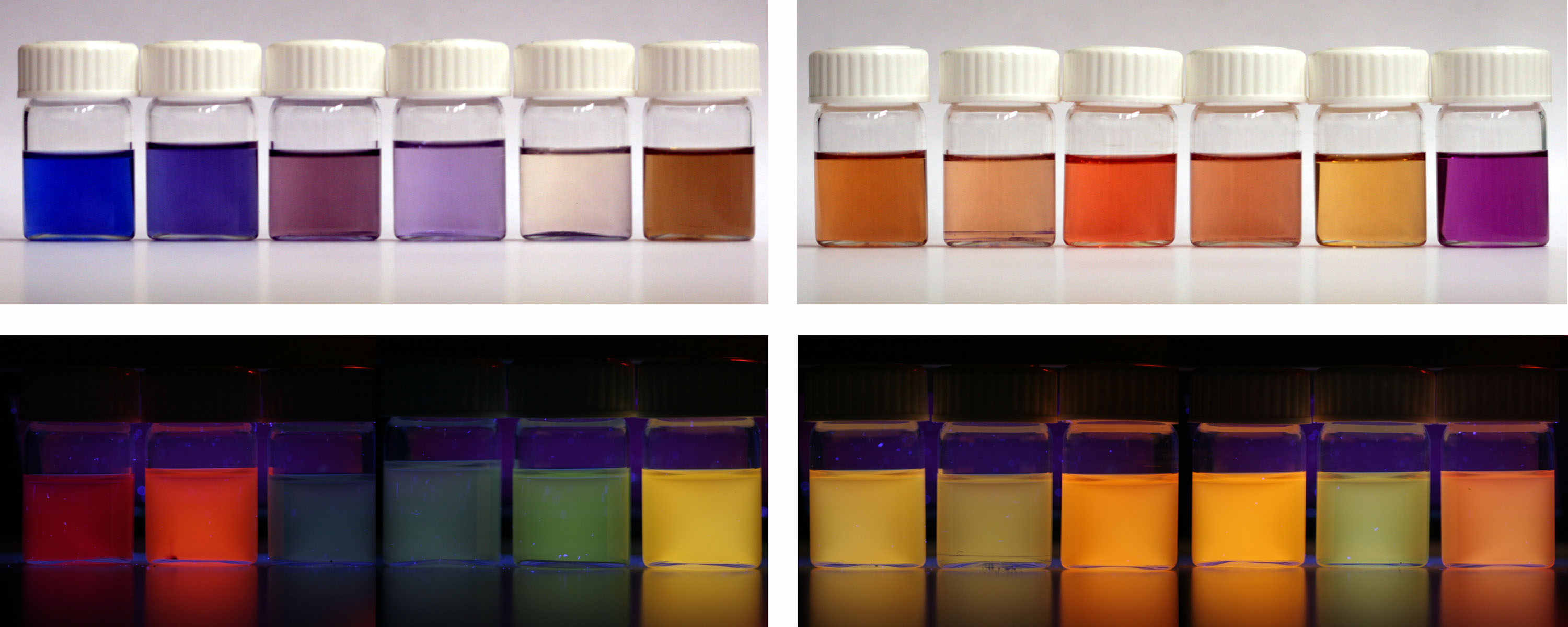
Nile blue (free base) in daylight (top row) and UV light (366 nm, bottom row) in different solvents. Left to right: 1. methanol, 2. ethanol, 3. methyl-tert-butylether, 4. cyclohexane, 5. n-hexane, 6. acetone, 7. tetrahydrofuran, 8. ethyl acetate, 9. dimethyl formamide, 10. acetonitrile, 11. toluene, 12. chloroform

== Chemical and physical properties ==
Nile blue is a fluorescent dye. The fluorescence shows especially in nonpolar solvents with a high quantum yield.

The absorption and emission maxima of Nile blue are strongly dependent on pH and the solvents used:

Solvent	Absorption λ max (nm)	Emission λ max (nm)
Toluene	493	574
Acetone	499	596
Dimethylformamide	504	598
Chloroform	624	647
1-Butanol	627	664
2-propanol	627	665
Ethanol	628	667
Methanol	626	668
Water	635	674
1.0 M hydrochloric acid (pH = 0)	457	556
0.1 M sodium hydroxide solution (pH = 13.0)	522	668
Ammonia water (pH = 11-12)	524	668

The duration of Nile blue fluorescence in ethanol was measured as 1.42 ns. This is shorter than the corresponding value of Nile red with 3.65 ns. The fluorescence duration is independent on dilution in the range 10^{−3} to 10^{−8} mol/L.

== Nile blue staining ==
Nile blue is used for histological staining of biological preparations. It highlights the distinction between neutral lipids (triglycerides, cholesteryl esters, steroids) which are stained pink and acids (fatty acids, chromolipids, phospholipids) which are stained blue.

The Nile blue staining, according to Kleeberg, uses the following chemicals:

- Nile Blue A
- 1% acetic acid
- Glycerol or glycerol gelatin

=== Workflow ===
The sample or frozen sections is/are fixated in formaldehyde, then immersed for 20 minutes in the Nile blue solution or 30 sec in nile blue A (1% w/v in distilled water) and rinsed with water. For better differentiation, it is dipped in 1% acetic acid for 10–20 minutes or 30 sec until the colors are pure. This might take only 1–2 minutes. Then the sample is thoroughly rinsed in water (for one to two hours). Afterwards, the stained specimen is taken on a microscope slide and excess water is removed. The sample can be embedded in glycerol or glycerol gelatin.

=== Results ===
Unsaturated glycerides are pink, nuclei and elastins are dark, fatty acids and various fatty substances and fat mixtures are purple blue.

==== Example: Detection of poly-β-hydroxybutyrate granules (PHB) ====
The PHB granules in the cells of Pseudomonas solanacearum can be visualized by Nile blue A staining. The PHB granules in the stained smears are observed with an epifluorescence microscope under oil immersion, at a 1000 times magnification; under 450 nm excitation wavelength they show a strong orange fluorescence.

== Nile blue in DNA Electrophoresis ==
Nile blue is also used in a variety of commercial DNA staining formulations used for DNA electrophoresis. As it does not require UV trans-illumination in order to be visualised in an agarose gel as with ethidium bromide, it can be used to observe DNA as it is separated and also as a dye to aid in gel-extraction of DNA fragments without incurring damage by UV-irradiation.

== Nile blue in oncology ==
Derivatives of Nile blue are potential photosensitizers in photodynamic therapy of malignant tumors. These dyes aggregate in the tumor cells, especially in the lipid membranes, and/or are sequestered and concentrated in subcellular organelles.

With the Nile blue derivative N-ethyl-Nile blue (EtNBA), normal and premalignant tissues in animal experiments can be distinguished by fluorescence spectroscopy in fluorescence imaging. EtNBA shows no phototoxic effects.

== Synthesis ==
Nile Blue and related naphthoxazinium dyes can be prepared by acid-catalyzed condensation of either 5-(dialkylamino)-2-nitrosophenols with 1-naphthylamine, 3-(dialkylamino)phenols with N-alkylated 4-nitroso-1-naphtylamines, or N,N-dialkyl-1,4-phenylenediamines with 4-(dialkylamino)-1,2-naphthoquinones. Alternatively, the product of an acid-catalyzed condensation of 4-nitroso-N,N-dialkylaniline with 2-naphthol (a salt of 9-(dialkylamino)benzo[a]phenoxazin-7-ium) can be oxidized in the presence of an amine, installing a second amino substituent in 5-position of the benzo[a]phenoxazinium system. The following scheme illustrates the first of these four approaches, leading to Nile Blue perchlorate:

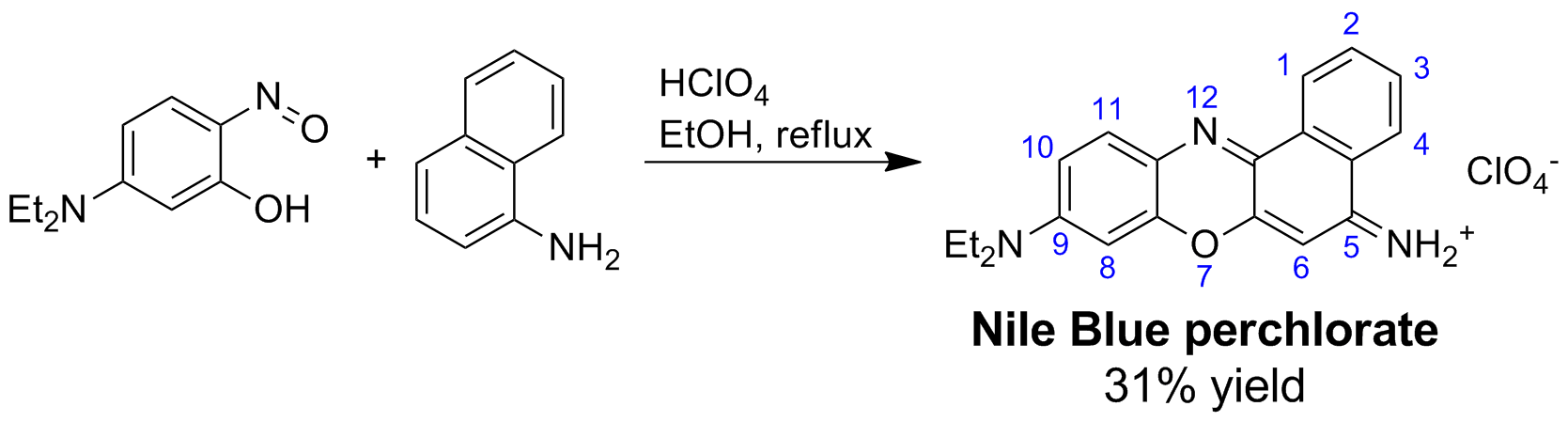
Nile Blue perchlorate synthesis
