= Nile red =

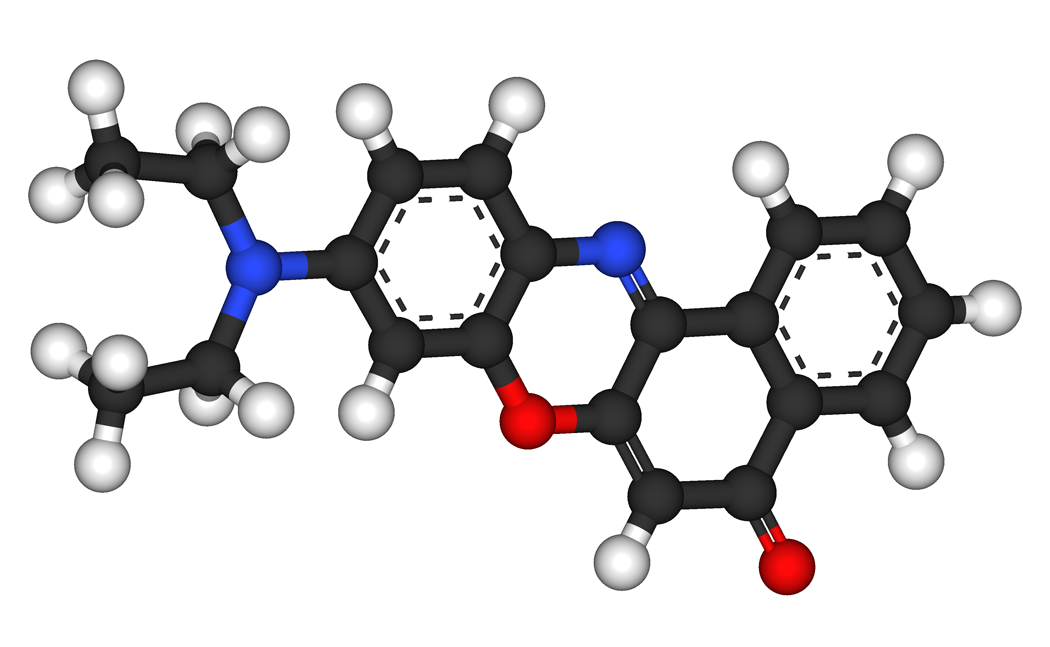

Names
- Preferred IUPAC name 9-(Diethylamino)-5H-benzo[a]phenoxazin-5-one
- Other names Nile red, Nile blue oxazone

Identifiers
CAS Number	7385-67-3
3D model (JSmol)	Interactive image
ChEBI	CHEBI:52169
ChEMBL	ChEMBL144472
ChemSpider	58681
ECHA InfoCard	100.028.151
PubChem CID	65182
UNII	P476F1L81G
CompTox Dashboard (EPA)	DTXSID7064653
- InChI: InChI=1S/C20H18N2O2/c1-3-22(4-2)13-9-10-16-18(11-13)24-19-12-17(23)14-7-5-6-8-15(14)20(19)21-16/h5-12H,3-4H2,1-2H3 Key: VOFUROIFQGPCGE-UHFFFAOYSA-N; InChI=1/C20H18N2O2/c1-3-22(4-2)13-9-10-16-18(11-13)24-19-12-17(23)14-7-5-6-8-15(14)20(19)21-16/h5-12H,3-4H2,1-2H3 Key: VOFUROIFQGPCGE-UHFFFAOYAM
- SMILES: CCN(CC)c1ccc2c(c1)oc-3cc(=O)c4ccccc4c3n2

Properties
Chemical formula	C_{20}H_{18}N_{2}O_{2}
Molar mass	318.376 g/mol
Melting point	203–205 °C
- Except where otherwise noted, data are given for materials in their standard state (at 25 °C [77 °F], 100 kPa). verify (what is ?) Infobox references

Nile red (also known as Nile blue oxazone) is a lipophilic stain. Nile red stains intracellular lipid droplets yellow. In most polar solvents, Nile red will not fluoresce; however, when in a lipid-rich environment, it can be intensely fluorescent, with varying colors from deep red (for polar membrane lipid) to strong yellow-gold emission (for neutral lipid in intracellular storages). The dye is highly solvatochromic and its emission and excitation wavelength both shift depending on solvent polarity and in polar media will hardly fluoresce at all.

Nile red has applications in cell biology, where it can be used as a membrane dye which can be readily visualized using an epifluorescence microscope with excitation and emission wavelengths usually shared with red fluorescent protein. Nile red has also been used as part of a sensitive detection process for microplastics in bottled water. Additionally, nile red is a remarkable candidate in fabricating membrane for different sensors to detect environmental changes, such as taste, gas, pH, etc.

In triglycerides (a neutral lipid), Nile red has an excitation maximum of about 515 nm (green), and emission maximum of about 585 nm (yellow-orange). In contrast, in phospholipids (polar lipids), Nile red has an excitation maximum of about 554 nm (green), and an emission maximum of about 638 nm (red).

The diffusion coefficient of Nile red in ethanol has been reported 470 μm^{2}/s.

== Synthesis ==
Nile red can be prepared through an acid hydrolysis by boiling a solution of Nile blue with sulfuric acid. This process replaces an iminium group with a carbonyl group. Alternatively, Nile red and its analogs (naphthooxazine dyes) can be prepared by acid-catalyzed condensation of corresponding 5-(dialkylamino)-2-nitrosophenols with 2-naphthol. The yields are generally moderate as no co-oxidant is used in this procedure. Since the reaction to generate Nile red does not usually completely exhaust the supply of Nile blue, additional separation steps are required if pure Nile red is needed.

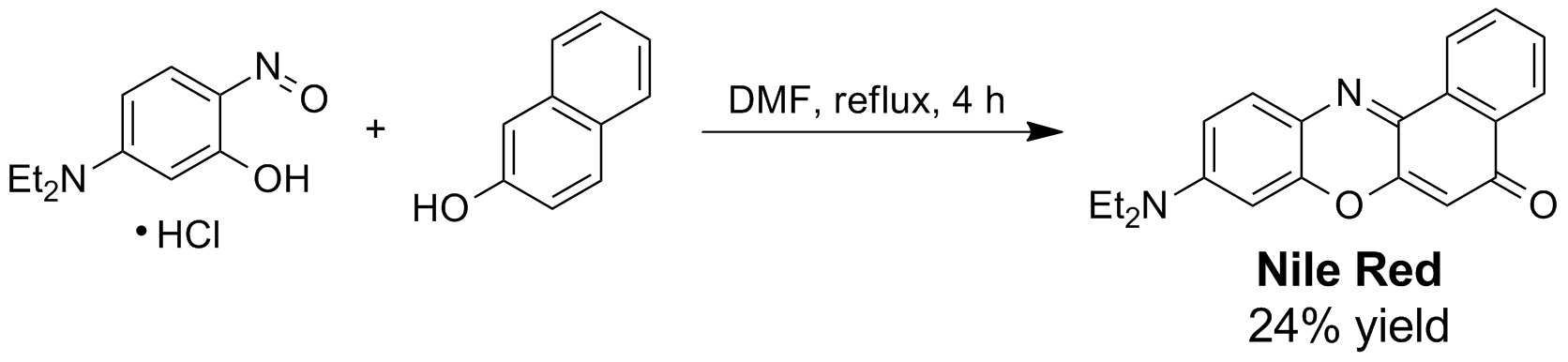
Nile red synthesis

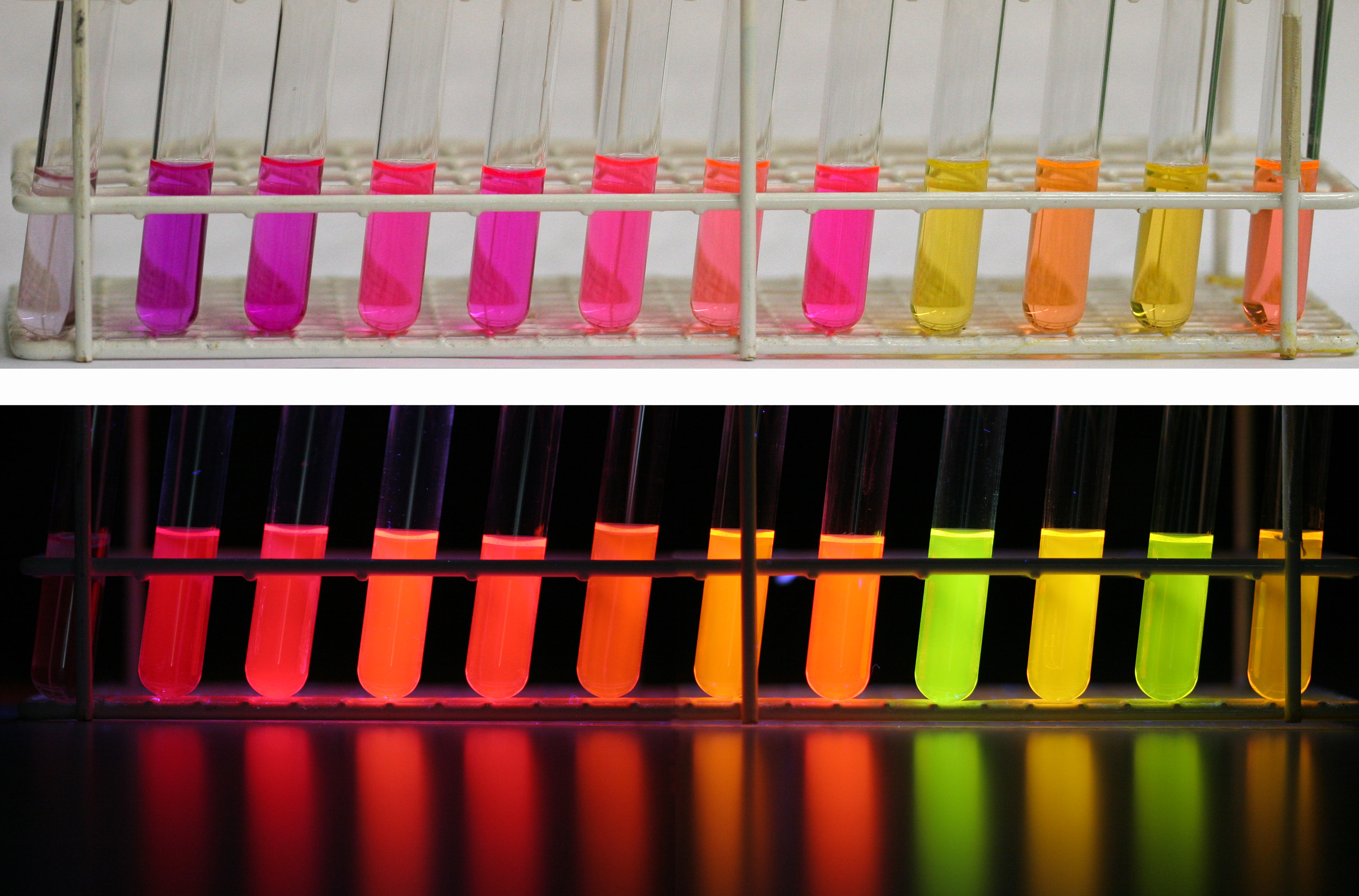
Nile red under visible and ultraviolet (366 nm) light in different solvents. From left to right: 1. water, 2. methanol, 3. ethanol, 4. acetonitrile, 5. dimethylformamide, 6. acetone, 7. ethyl acetate, 8. dichloromethane, 9. n-hexane, 10. methyl-tert-butylether, 11. cyclohexane, 12. toluene.

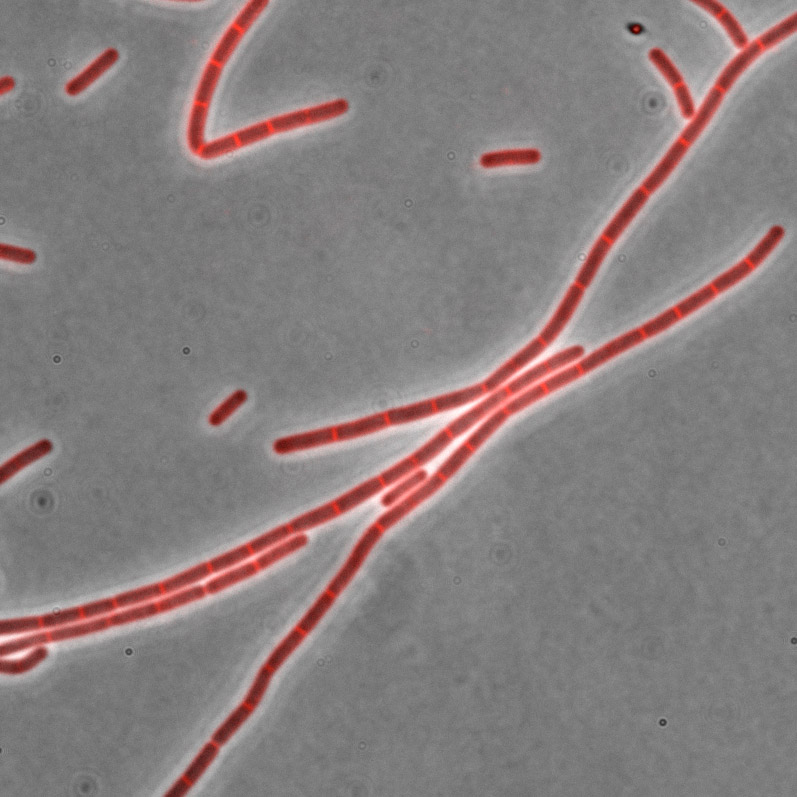
Bacillus subtilis stained with Nile red as a membrane dye (shown in red). This strain grows partly as cell chains, so a membrane dye may be useful to distinguish internal cell boundaries.
