= Low smoke zero halogen =

Material classification for cable jacketing

Low smoke zero halogen or low smoke free of halogen (LSZH or LSOH or LS0H or LSFH or OHLS or ZHFR) is a material classification typically used for cable jacketing in the wire and cable industry. LSZH cable jacketing is composed of thermoplastic or thermoset compounds that emit limited smoke and no halogen when exposed to high sources of heat.

In the industry, it has many names, summarized in the following table:

LSZH Conduit Industry Abbreviations List
| Abbreviation | Meaning |
|---|---|
| LSZH | Low smoke, zero halogen |
| LSF | Low smoke, fume |
| LSOH (LS0H) | Low smoke, zero (0) halogen |
| LSHF (LSFH) | Low smoke, halogen-free(free halogen) |
| LSNH | Low smoke, non-halogen |
| NHFR | Non-halogen, flame retardant |
| HFFR | Halogen-free, flame retardant |
| ZHFR | Zero Halogen, Flame Retardant |
| OHLS | Zero Halogen, Low Smoke |
| HFT | Halogen Free and Flame Retardant, Temperature Resistant |
| RKHF | RK means wall thickness, Halogen Free |

== Description ==
The first commercial thermoplastic LSZH material for cable jacketing was invented by Richard Skipper in 1979 and patented by Raychem Corporation. This invention resolved the challenge of incorporating sufficient inorganic filler, aluminium trihydrate (ALTH), into an appropriate thermoplastic matrix to suppress the fire and allow a char to be formed, which reduced emission of poisonous carbon gases and also smoke and carbon particles, whilst maintaining electrical insulation properties and physical properties required by the end application. The preferred inorganic filler to achieve flame retardation continues to be aluminium trihydrate (ALTH). In the event of a fire this material undergoes an endothermic chemical reaction

2Al(OH)_{3} → Al_{2}O_{3} + 3H_{2}O (180 °C)

that absorbs heat energy and releases steam when the compound reaches a certain temperature. It is critical that the decomposition of the polymer(s) used to carry the filler happens at approximately the same temperature. The steam disrupts combustion of the evolved gases and helps form a char layer that protects the remaining material and traps particulates. The high level of filler required (≈ 60%) also replaces the base polymer reducing the total amount of fuel available for combustion.

Low smoke zero halogen cable considerably reduces the amount of toxic and corrosive gas emitted during combustion. When burned, a low-smoke zero halogen cable emits a less optically dense smoke that releases at a lower rate. During a fire, a low-smoke cable is desirable because it reduces the amount and density of the smoke, which makes exiting a space easier for occupants as well as increases the safety of firefighting operations. This type of material is typically used in poorly ventilated areas such as aircraft, rail carriages, tanks, subsea and offshore installations, submarines or ships. It is also used extensively in the rail industry, wherever high voltage or track signal wires must be run into and through tunnel systems. The nuclear industry is another area where LSZH cables have been and will be used in the future. Major cable manufacturers have been producing LSZH cables for nuclear facilities since the early 1990s. Construction of new nuclear plants will almost certainly involve extensive use of LSZH cable. This will reduce the chance of toxic gases accumulating in those areas where personnel are working and the lack of corrosive gases where there are computer controlled systems will reduce the possibility of wires being damaged by fire resulting in a short circuit fault.

Since the 1970s, the wire and cable industry has been using low-smoke, low-halogen materials in a number of applications. The introduction of a thermoplastic LSZH extended its use to accessories such as heat shrink tubing, labelling and fixtures. The objective was to create a wire and cable jacketing system that was not only flame retardant but also did not generate dense, obscuring smoke and less toxic or corrosive gases. In the military field its introduction was accelerated after 1982 following the dense black smoke emitted from HMS Sheffield after being hit by an Exocet missile in the Falklands War. Several fires, such as the King's Cross fire in London that killed 31 people in London's underground in 1987, increased the awareness of the contribution that wire and cable jacketing makes in a fire. As a result, there has been an increased use of LSZH cables. With an increase in the amount of cable found in residential, commercial and industrial applications in recent years, there is a greater fuel load in the event of a fire and LSZH systems have a major role to play in protecting the public.

Several standards describe the processes used for measuring smoke output during combustion. For military applications Def Stan 02–711 in the UK and ASTM E662 in the US which are both based on an ASTM STP No. 422 pages 166–204, 1967 modified by AMTE, Portsmouth in the UK and superseded by E662 in the US. During these tests a specified material sample is standardised and then exposed to a radiant heat source; the optical density of the smoke given off is photometrically measured. There are various means of measuring optical density: peak smoke release rate, total smoke released, and smoke density at various points and durations during the test. Results must be below a certain value and the material must pass the burn test in order for the material to be labelled as low smoke.

These tests are conducted under laboratory conditions and cannot claim to replicate the range of conditions expected in a real fire scenario. However they do provide a measure by which the potential smoke emission of materials can be assessed and dangerous materials identified before proceeding to further testing of preferred materials, if deemed necessary.
