= Thermoset polymer matrix =

A thermoset polymer matrix is a synthetic polymer reinforcement where polymers act as binder or matrix to secure in place incorporated particulates, fibres or other reinforcements. They were first developed for structural applications, such as glass-reinforced plastic radar domes on aircraft and graphite-epoxy payload bay doors on the Space Shuttle.

They were first used after World War II, and continuing research has led to an increased range of thermoset resins, polymers or plastics, as well as engineering grade thermoplastics. They were all developed for use in the manufacture of polymer composites with enhanced and longer-term service capabilities. Thermoset polymer matrix technologies also find use in a wide diversity of non-structural industrial applications.

The foremost types of thermosetting polymers used in structural composites are benzoxazine resins, bis-maleimide resins (BMI), cyanate ester resins, epoxy (epoxide) resins, phenolic (PF) resins, unsaturated polyester (UP) resins, polyimides, polyurethane (PUR) resins, silicones, and vinyl esters.

== Benzoxazine resins ==
These are made by the reaction of phenols, formaldehyde and primary amines which at elevated temperatures (400 °F (204 °C)) undergo ring–opening polymerisation forming polybenzoxazine thermoset networks; when hybridised with epoxy and phenolic resins the resulting ternary systems have glass transition temperatures in excess of 490 °F (254 °C).

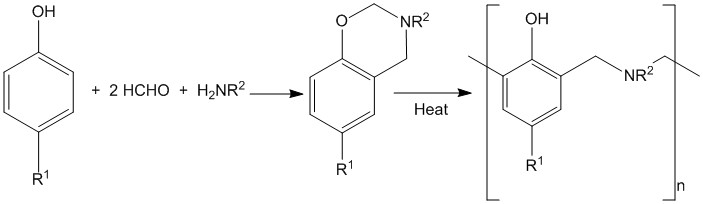
Benzoxazine resin synthetic pathway, structure and cure mechanism

Cure is characterised by expansion rather than shrinkage and uses include structural prepregs, liquid molding and film adhesives for composite construction, bonding and repair. The high aromatic content of the high molecular weight polymers provides enhanced mechanical and flammability performance compared to epoxy and phenolic resins.

== Bis-maleimides (BMI) ==
Formed by the condensation reaction of a diamine with maleic anhydride, and processed basically like epoxy resins (350 °F (177 °C) cure). After an elevated post-cure (450 °F (232 °C)), they will exhibit superior properties. These properties are influenced by a 400–450 °F (204–232 °C) continuous use temperature and a glass transition of 500 °F (260 °C).

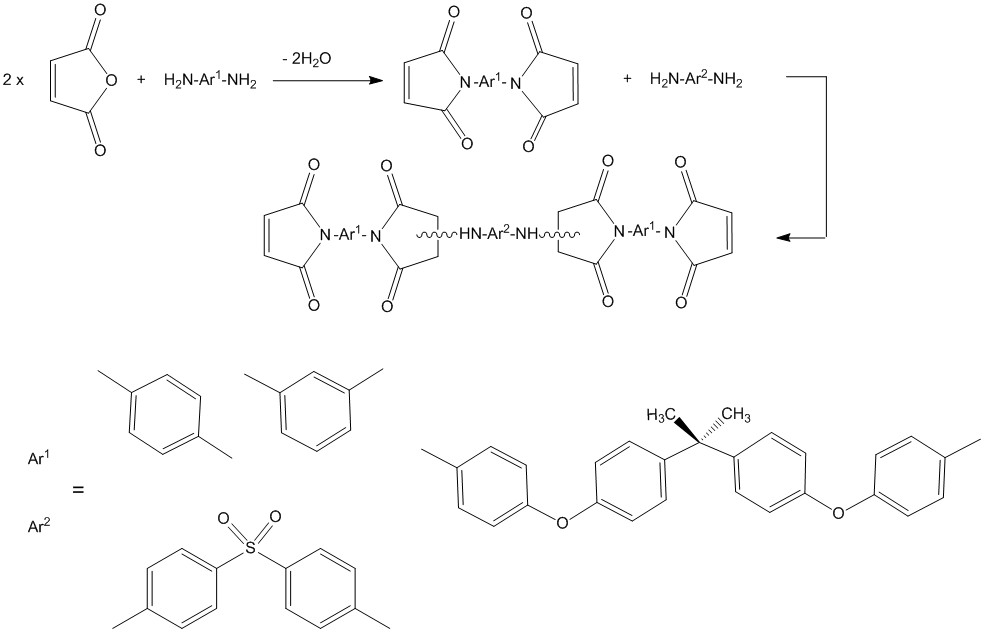
Bismaleimide resin synthetic pathway and structure

This thermoset polymer type is merged into composites as a prepreg matrix used in electrical printed circuit boards, and for large scale structural aircraft – aerospace composite structures, etc. It is also used as a coating material and as the matrix of glass reinforced pipes, particularly in high temperature and chemical environments.

== Cyanate ester resins ==
The reaction of bisphenols or multifunctional phenol novolac resins with cyanogen bromide or chloride leads to cyanate functional monomers which can be converted in a controlled manner into cyanate ester functional prepolymer resins by chain extension or copolymerization. When postcured, all residual cyanate ester functionality polymerises by cyclotrimerisation leading to tightly crosslinked polycyanurate networks with high thermal stability and glass transition temperatures up to 752 °F (400 °C) and wet heat stability up to around 400 °F (204 °C).

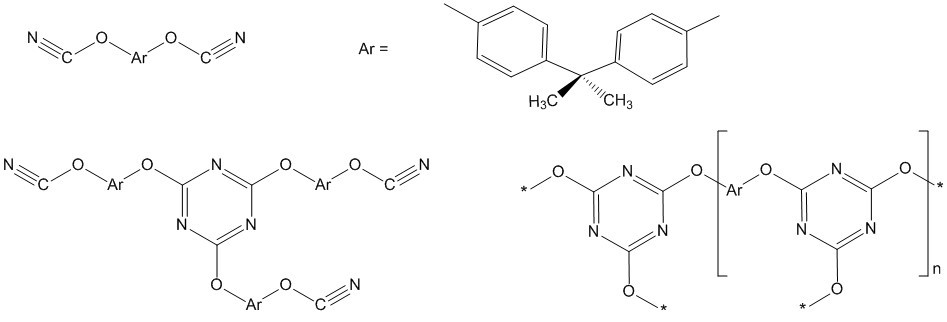
Cyanate ester monomer, prepolymer and polycyanurate structures

Cyanate ester resin prepregs combine the high temperature stability of polyimides with the flame and fire resistance of phenolics and are used in the manufacture of aerospace structural composite components which meet fire protection regulations concerning flammability, smoke density and toxicity. Other uses include film adhesives, surfacing films and 3D printing.

== Epoxy (epoxide) resins ==
Epoxy resins are thermosetting prepolymers made either by the reaction of epichlorohydrin with hydroxyl functional aromatics, cycloaliphatics and aliphatics or amine functional aromatics, or by the oxidation of unsaturated cycloaliphatics. The diglycidyl ethers of bisphenol-A (DGEBA) and bisphenol-F (DGEBF) are the most widely used due to their characteristic high adhesion, mechanical strength, heat and corrosion resistance. Epoxide functional resins and prepolymers cure by polyaddition/copolymerisation or homopolymerisation depending on the selection of crosslinker, hardener, curing agent or catalyst as well as by the temperature.

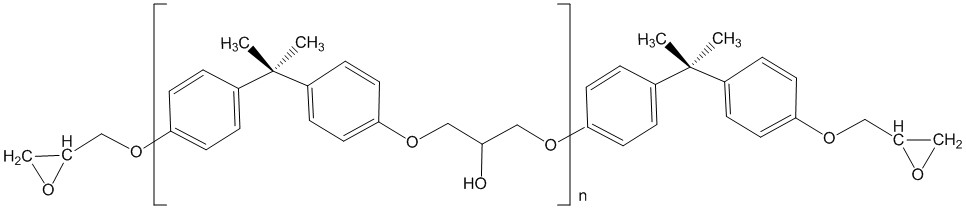
Diglycidyl ether of bisphenol-A epoxy resin structure

Epoxy resin is used widely in numerous formulations and forms in the aircraft-aerospace industry. It is regarded as "the work-horse of modern day composites". In recent years, the epoxy formulations used in composite prepregs have been fine-tuned to improve their toughness, impact strength and moisture absorption resistance. Maximum properties have been realized for this polymer.

This is not only used in aircraft-aerospace demand. It is used in military and commercial applications and is also used in construction. Epoxy-reinforced concrete and glass-reinforced and carbon-reinforced epoxy structures are used in building and bridge structures.

Epoxy composites have the following properties:

- High-Strength Glass Fiber Reinforced
- Relative Density 1.6-2.0
- Melting temperature (°C)
- Thermoset Processing Range (°F) C:300-330, I=280-380
- Molding pressure 1–5
- Shrinkage 0.001-0.008
- Tensile strength (p.s.i.) 5,000-20,000
- Compressive strength (p.s.i.) 18,000-40,000
- Flexural Strength (p.s.i.) 8000–30,000
- Izod impact strength (ft·lb/in) 0.3-10.0
- Linear expansion (10^{−6} in./in./°C) 11–50
- Hardness Rockwell M100-112
- Flammability V-0
- Water absorption 24h (%) 0.04-0.20

Epoxy Phenol Novolac (EPN) and Epoxy Cresol Novolac (ECN) resins made by reacting epichlorohydrin with multifunctional phenol novolac or cresol novolac resins have more reactive sites compared to DGEBF epoxy resins and on cure result in higher crosslink density thermosets. They are used in printed wire/circuit board laminating and also for electrical encapsulation, adhesive and coatings for metal where there is a need to provide protection from corrosion, erosion or chemical attack at high continuous operating temperatures.

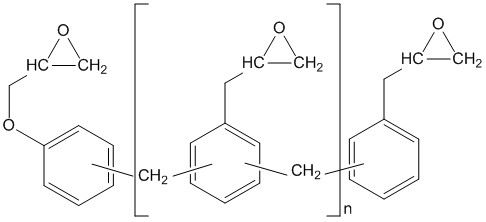
Epoxy phenol novolac resin structure

== Phenolic (PF) resins ==
There are two types of phenolic resins - novolacs and resoles. Novolacs are made with acid catalysts and a molar ratio of formaldehyde to phenol of less than one to give methylene linked phenolic oligomers; resoles are made with alkali catalysts and a molar ratio of formaldehyde to phenol of greater than one to give phenolic oligomers with methylene and benzylic ether-linked phenol units.

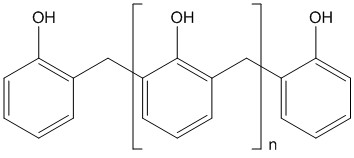
Novolac phenolic resin structure

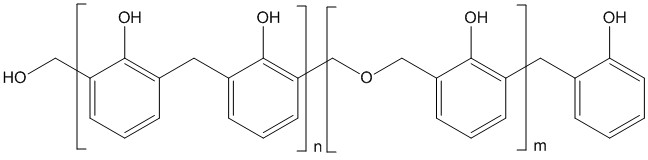
Resole phenolic resin structure

Phenolic resins, originally developed in the late 19th century and, regarded as the first truly synthetic polymer types, are often referred to as the "work-horse of thermosetting resins". They are characterised by high bonding strength, dimensional stability and creep resistance at elevated temperatures, and frequently combined with co-curing resins such as epoxies.

General purpose molding compounds, engineering molding compounds and sheet molding compounds are the primary forms of phenolic composites. Phenolics are also used as the matrix binder with Honeycomb core. Phenolics find use in many electrical applications such as breaker boxes, brake lining materials and most recently in combination with various reinforcements in the molding of an engine block-head assembly, called the polimotor. Phenolics may be processed by the various common techniques, including compression, transfer and injection molding.

Properties of phenolic composites have the following properties:

- High-Strength Glass Fiber Reinforced
- Relative Density 1.69-2.0
- Water Absorption 24h(%) 0.03-1.2
- Melting Temperature (◦c)
- Thermo set Processing Range (◦F) C:300-380 I:330-390
- Molding pressure I-20
- Shrinkage 0.001-0.004
- Tensile Strength (p.s.i.) 7000–18000
- Compressive Strength (p.s.i.) 16,000-70,000
- Flexural Strength (p.s.i.)12,000-60,000
- Izod Impact strength (ft-lb/in) 0.5-18.0
- Linear expansion (10−6 in./in./°C) 8–21
- Hardness Rockwell E54-101
- Flammability V-0

== Polyester resins ==
Unsaturated polyester resins are an extremely versatile, and fairly inexpensive class of thermosetting polymer formed by the polycondensation of glycol mixtures often containing propylene glycol, with a dibasic acid and anhydrides usually maleic anhydride to provide backbone unsaturation needed for crosslinking, and phthalic anhydride, isophthalic acid or terephthalic acid where superior structural and corrosion resistance properties are required. Polyester resins are routinely diluted/dissolved in a vinyl functional monomer such as styrene and include an inhibitor to stabilize the resin for storage purposes. Polymerisation in service is initiated by free radicals generated from ionizing radiation or by the photolytic or thermal decomposition of a radical initiator. Organic peroxides, such as methyl ethyl ketone peroxide and auxiliary accelerators which promote decomposition to form radicals are combined with the resin to initiate a room temperature cure.

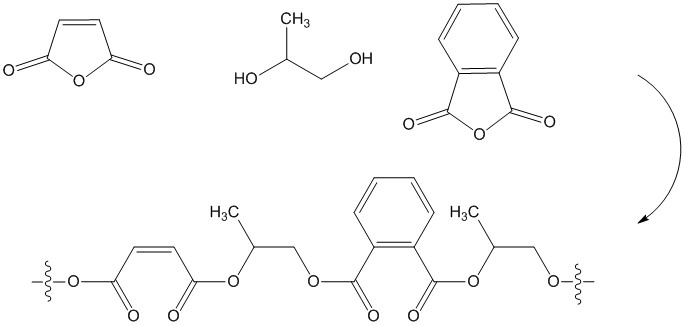
Unsaturated polyester resin synthetic pathway and structure

In the liquid state, unsaturated polyester resins may be processed by numerous methods, including Hand Layup, vacuum bag molding, and spray-up and compression molded Sheet Molding Compound (SMC). They can also be B-staged after application to chopped reinforcement and continuous reinforcement, to form pre-pregs. Solid molding compounds in the form of pellets or granules are also used in processes such as compression and transfer molding.

== Polyimides ==
There are two types of commercial polyimides: thermosetting cross-linkable polyimides made by the condensation of aromatic diamines with aromatic dianhydride derivatives and anhydrides with unsaturated sites that facilitate addition polymerisation between preformed imide monomers and oligomers, and thermoplastic polyimides formed by the condensation reaction between aromatic diamines and aromatic dianhydrides. Thermoset polyimides are the most advanced of all thermoset polymer matrices with characteristics of high temperature physical and mechanical properties and are available commercially as resin, prepreg, stock shapes, thin sheets/films, laminates, and machined parts. Along with the high temperature properties, this thermoset polymer type must be processed at very high temperatures and relative pressure to produce optimum characteristics. With prepreg materials, 600 °F (316 °C) to 650 °F (343 °C) temperatures and 200 psi (1,379 kPa) pressures are required. The entire cure profiles are inherently long as there are a number of intermediate temperatures dwells, duration of which are dependent on part size and thickness.

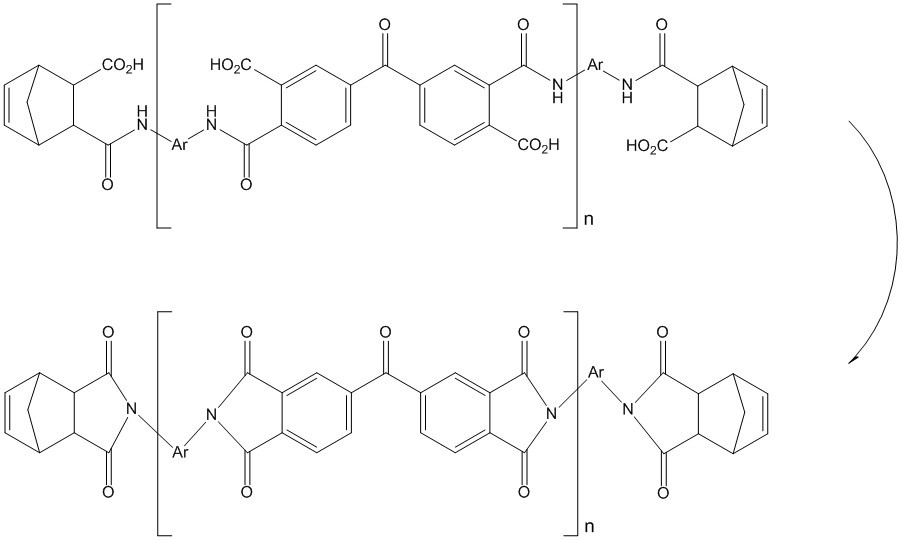
Thermoset polyimide prepolymer structure

The cut of polyimides is 450 °F (232 °C), highest of all thermosets, with short term exposure capabilities of 900 °F (482 °C). Normal operating temperatures range from cryogenic to 500 °F (260 °C).

Polyimide composites have the following properties:

- Good mechanical properties and retention at high temperatures
- Good electrical properties
- High wear resistance
- Low creep at high temperatures
- Good compression with glass or graphite fiber reinforcement
- Good chemical resistance
- Inherently flame resistant
- Unaffected by most solvents and oils

Polyimide film possesses a unique combination of properties that make it ideal for a variety of applications in many different industries, especially as physical, electrical, and mechanical properties are maintained over a wide temperature range.

High-performance polyimide resin is used in electrical, wear resistant and as structural materials when combined with reinforcement for aircraft-aerospace applications, which are replacing heavier more expensive metals. High temperature processing causes some technical problems as well as higher costs compared to other polymers. Hysols PMR series is an example of this polymer.

== Polyurethane (PUR) resins ==
Thermoset polyurethane prepolymers with carbamate (-NH-CO-O-) links are linear and elastomeric if formed by combining diisocyanates (OCN-R_{1}-NCO) with long chain diols (HO-R_{2}-OH), or crosslinked and rigid if formed from combinations of polyisocyanates and, polyols. They can be solid or have an open cellular structure if foamed, and are widely used for their characteristic high adhesion and resistance to fatigue. Polyurethane foam structural cores combined with glass-reinforced or graphite-reinforced composite laminates are used to make lightweight, strong, sandwich structures. All forms of the material, inclusive of flexible and rigid foams, foam moldings, solid elastomeric moldings and extrudates, when combined with various reinforcement–fillers have found commercial applications in thermoset polymer matrix composites.

They differ from polyureas which are thermoset elastomeric polymers with carbamide (-NH-CO-NH-) links made by combining diisocyanate monomers or prepolymers (OCN-R-NCO) with blends of long-chain amine-terminated polyether or polyester resins (H_{2}N-R_{L}-NH_{2}) and short-chain diamine extenders (H_{2}N-R_{s}-NH_{2}). Polyureas are characterised by near instantaneous cure, high mechanical strength and resistance to corrosion so are widely used for 1:1 volume mix ratio spray applied, abrasion resistant waterproofing protective coating and lining.

== Silicone resins ==
Silicone resins are partly organic in nature with a backbone polymer structure made of alternating silicon and oxygen atoms rather than the familiar carbon-to-carbon backbone characteristics of organic polymers. In addition to having at least one oxygen atom bonded to each silicon atom, silicone resins have direct bonds to carbon and therefore also known as polyorganosiloxanes. They have the general formula (R2SiO)n and the physical form (liquid, gel, elastomer or solid) and use varies with molecular weight, structure (linear, branched, caged) and nature of substituent groups (R = alkyl, aryl, H, OH, alkoxy). Aryl substituted silicone resins have greater thermal stability than alkyl substituted silicone resins when polymerised (condensation cure mechanism) at temperatures between ~300 °F (~150 °C) and ~400 °F (~200 °C). Heating above ~600 °F (~ 300 °C) converts all silicone polymers into ceramics since all organic constituents pyrolytically decompose leaving crystalline silicate polymers with the general formula (-SiO_{2}-)n. In addition to applications as ceramic matrix composite precursors, silicone resins in the form of polysiloxane polymers made from silicone resins with pendant acrylate, vinyl ether or epoxy functionality find application as UV, electron beam and thermoset polymer matrix composites where they are characterised by their resistance to oxidation, heat and ultraviolet degradation.

Assorted other uses in the general area of composites for silicones include sealants, coating materials, and as a reusable bag material for vacuum-bag curing of composite parts.

== Vinyl ester resins ==
Vinyl ester resins made by addition reactions between an epoxy resin with acrylic acid derivatives, when diluted/dissolved in a vinyl functional monomer such as styrene, polymerise. The resulting thermosets are notable for their high adhesion, heat resistance and corrosion resistance. They are stronger than polyesters and more resistant to impact than epoxies. Vinyl ester resins are used for wet lay-up laminating, SMC and BMC in the manufacture and repair of corrosion and heat resistant components ranging from pipelines, vessels and buildings to transportation, marine, military and aerospace applications.

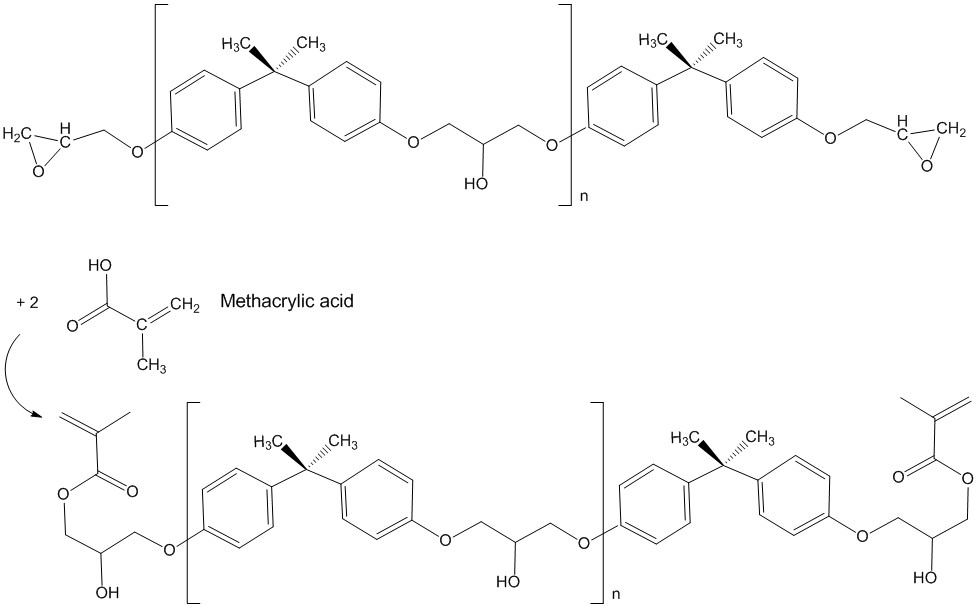
Vinyl ester

== Miscellaneous ==
Amino resins are another class of thermoset prepolymers formed by copolymerisation of amines or amides with an aldehyde. Urea-formaldehyde and melamine-formaldehyde resins, although not widely used in high performance structural composite applications, are characteristically used as the polymer matrix in molding and extrusion compounds where some use of fillers and reinforcements occurs. Urea-formaldehyde resins are widely used as the matrix binder in construction utility products such as particle board, wafer board, and plywood, which are true particulate and laminar composite structures. Melamine-formaldehyde resins are used for plastic laminating.

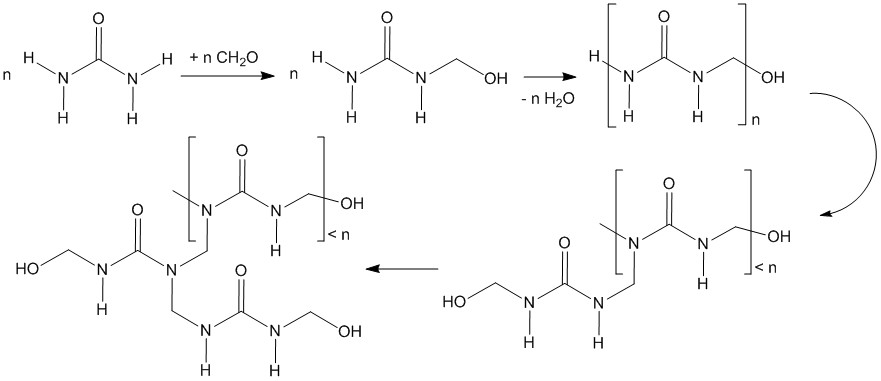
Urea-formaldehyde resin condensates

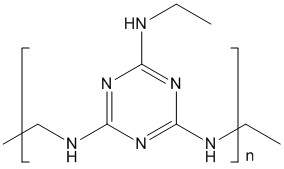
Cured melamine resin structure

Furan resin prepolymers made from furfuryl alcohol, or by modification of furfural with phenol, formaldehyde (methanal), urea or other extenders, are similar to amino and phenolic thermosetting resins in that cure involves polycondensation and release of water as well as heat. While they are generally cured under the influence of heat, catalysts and pressure, furan resins can also be formulated as dual-component no-bake acid-hardened systems which are characterised by high resistance to heat, acids and alkalies. Furan resins are of increasing interest for the manufacture of sustainable composites - biocomposites made from a bio-derived matrix (in this case furan resin), or biofibre reinforcement, or both.

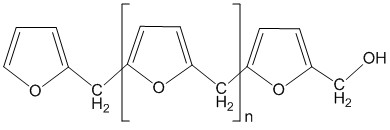
Idealized structure of Polyfurfuryl alcohol resin

== Advantages and disadvantages ==
=== Advantages ===
- Well established processing and application history
- Overall, better economics than thermoplastic polymers
- Better high temperature properties
- Good wetting and adhesion to reinforcement

=== Disadvantages ===
- Resins and composite materials often need to be refrigerated
- Moisture absorption and subsequent property degradation
- Long process cycles
- Reduced impact –toughness
- Poor recycling capabilities
- More difficult repair ability
