= Compression molding =

Method of molding

Compression molding - simplified diagram of the process

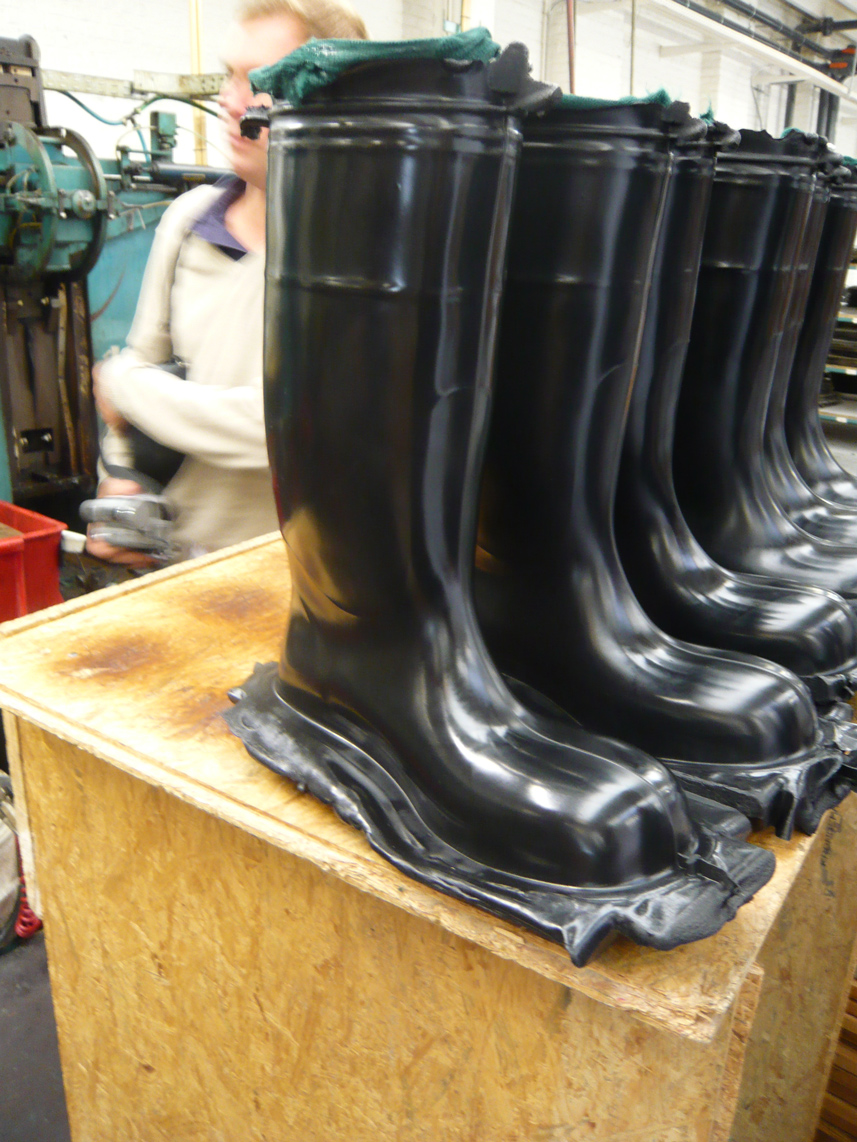
Compression molded rubber boots before the flashes are removed.

Compression molding is a method of molding in which a precise quantity of molding compound containing thermosetting or elastomeric resin called a charge is placed in the bottom half of a heated mold cavity, then flows to fill the cavity as the 2 sides of the mold are pressed together. The heat causes the material to polymerize and solidify, after which it can be removed as a solid part. The process typically uses high-strength hydraulic cylinders to push the mold sides together with hundreds of tons of force. Compression molding has lower tooling cost and wastes less material compared to alternatives like injection molding, but it is limited to simpler geometries and has a slower production rate.

Compression molding is well suited to working with fiber reinforced polymers. Reinforcement such as glass, aramid, and carbon fibers can be added to the charge to produce parts with greater stiffness and strength. It is also widely used to produce sandwich structures that incorporate a low-density core such as a honeycomb or polymer foam.

In compression molding there are six important considerations that an engineer should bear in mind:

- Determining the proper amount of material.
- Determining the minimum amount of energy required to heat the material.
- Determining the minimum time required to heat the material.
- Determining the appropriate heating technique.
- Predicting the required force, to ensure that shot attains the proper shape.
- Designing the mold for rapid cooling after the material has been compressed into the mold.

== Process definition ==
Compression molding is a forming process in which a plastic material is placed directly into a heated metal mold then is softened by the heat and therefore forced to conform to the shape of the mold, as the mold closes. Once molding is completed excess Flash may be removed. Typically, compression molding machines open along a vertical axis.

== Process characteristics ==
The use of thermoset plastic compounds characterizes this molding process from many of the other molding processes. These thermosets can be in either preform or granule shapes. Unlike some of the other processes we find that the materials are usually preheated and measured before molding. This helps to reduce excess flash. Inserts, usually metallic, can also be molded with the plastic. As a side note, remember not to allow any undercuts on the shape, it will make ejection especially difficult. Thermoplastic matrices with an inherent indefinite shelf-life and shorter cycle molding times are widely used and examples are shown in Ref 3.

== Process schematic ==
Compression molding is one of the oldest manufacturing techniques for rubber molding. The process parameters include molding time, temperature, and pressure. Usually, a 300-400 ton clamp pressure is used. The typical mold is shaped like a clam shell with the bottom being the mold cavity. The molding press looked a lot like a ladle filled vertical press used for casting aluminum. Compression molding uses preforms made by an extruder and wink cutter (in which two blades meet at the center to cut the extrudate to length) or a roller die and die cutter.

Compression molded water bottles are made from die-cut 3 inch by 6 inch sheets. One sheet is placed below a core and one sheet of equal size is placed above the core, and then the top of the mold is lowered by hand or by hoist to near shut. The mold is then pushed into the press, and the press is hydraulically closed to full pressure. The mold temperature is about 350 degrees. When the cycle ends (after about 3.5-4.0 minutes), the press opens and the mold is pulled out toward the operator. The operator opens the clam shell mold top and leans the top of the mold back against the press. Exposed is the bottle with the core still inside. While the bottle is still hot, the operator inserts prongs in between the bottle and the steel core and stretches the bottle at the neck to free it from the core.

The preforms for compression molded golf ball centers are extruded. The preform has a 1 inch by 1 inch round slug that stands up in the mold cavity. During the cycle, the operator loads the jig with slugs and places the jig over the mold. The preforms are released into the cavity of the mold when the slide tray is pulled. When the mold is opened, the lower platen lowers and the mold is hydraulically pushed out to the operator. The heat sheet (all molded parts from that cycle joined together by a parting line rind (flash)) is then placed in a transfer cart to be die cut.

== Typical tools and geometry produced ==
Three types of molds used are the flash plunger-type, straight plunger-type, and the "landed" plunger-type molds. The flash type mold must have an accurate charge of plastic and produces a horizontal flash (excess material protruding from the mold). The straight plunger-type mold allows for some inaccuracy in the charge of plastic and produces a vertical flash. The landed plunger type mold must have an accurate charge of plastic, and no flash is produced. Further details are explained in Ref 3.

== See also ==
- Matrix molding
