= Molding (process) =

Shaping a liquid or plastic material by making it conform to a more rigid mold

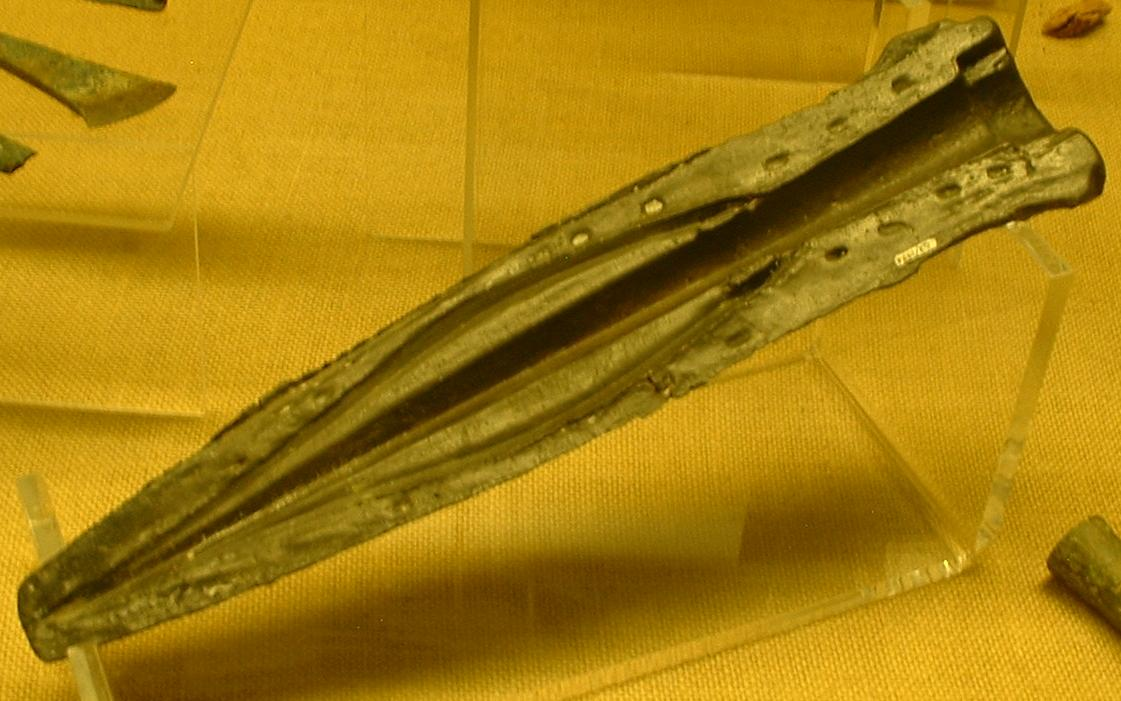
One half of a bronze mold for casting a socketed spear head dated to the period 1400-1000 BC. There are no known parallels for this mold.

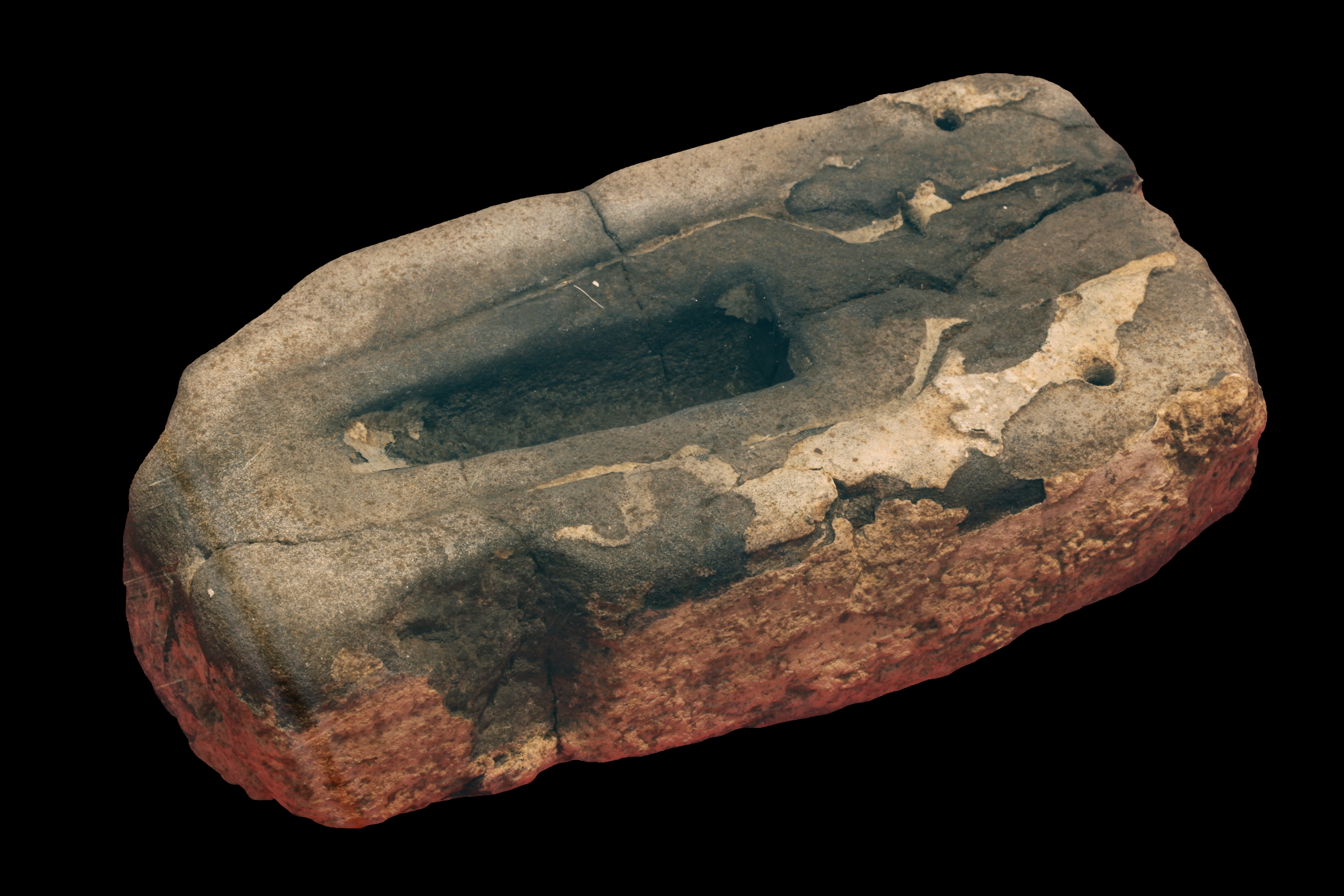
Stone mold of the Bronze Age used to produce spear tips.

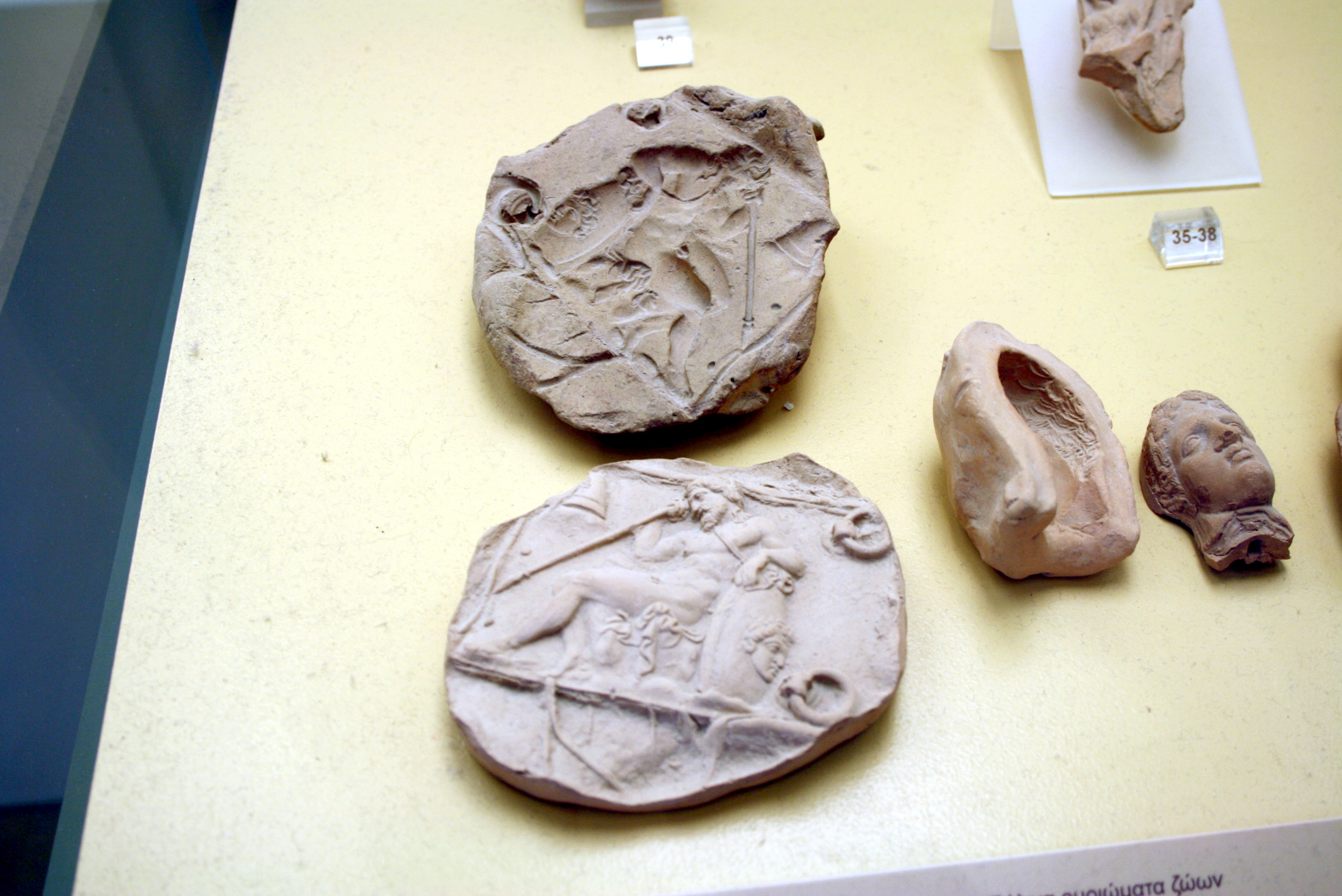
Ancient Greek molds, used to mass-produce clay figurines, 5th/4th century BC. Beside them, the modern casts taken from them. On display in the Ancient Agora Museum in Athens, housed in the Stoa of Attalus.

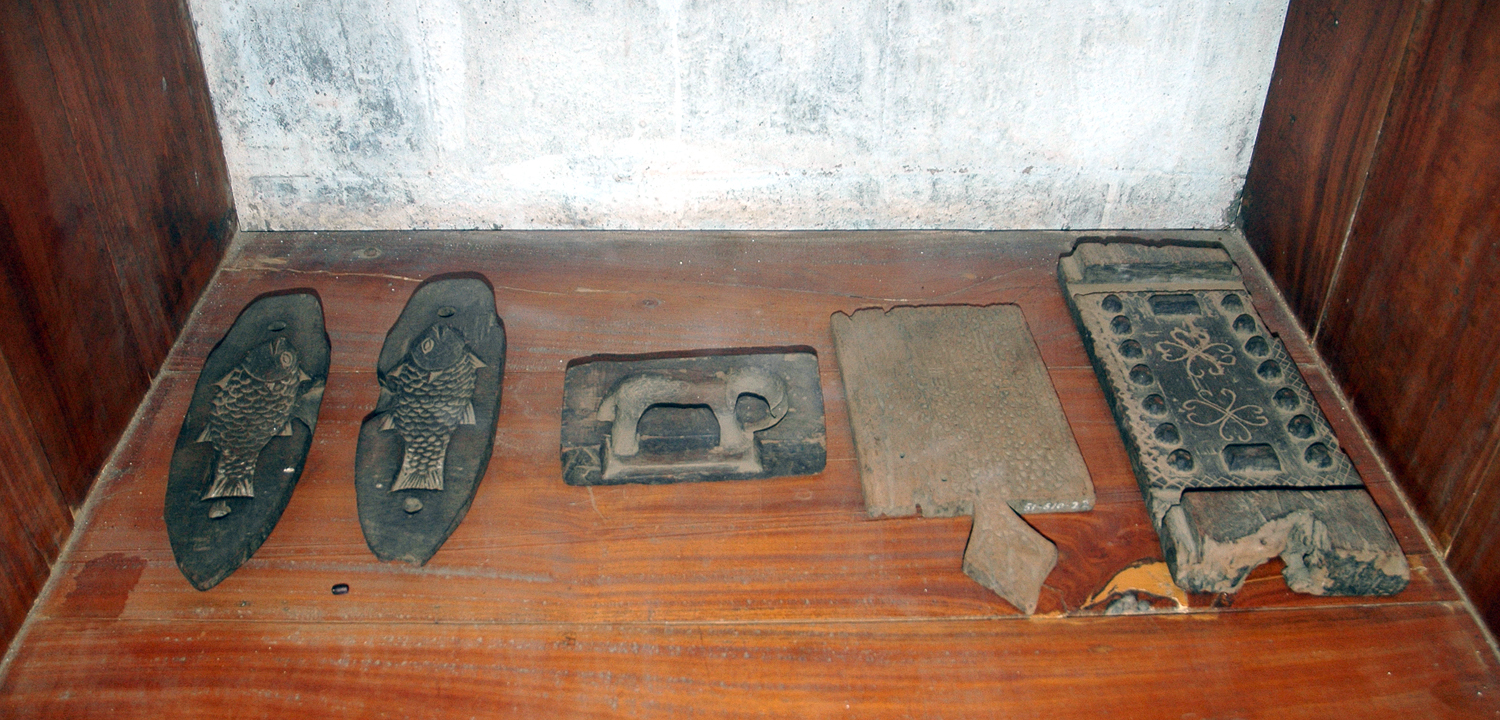
Ancient wooden molds used for jaggery & sweets, archaeological museum in Jaffna, Sri Lanka.

Molding (American English) or moulding (British and Commonwealth English; see spelling differences) is the process of manufacturing by shaping liquid or pliable raw material using a rigid frame called a mold or matrix. This itself may have been made using a pattern or model of the final object.

== Types of molds ==
A mold or mould is a hollowed-out block that is filled with a liquid or pliable material such as plastic, glass, metal, or ceramic raw material. The liquid hardens or sets inside the mold, adopting its shape. A mold is a counterpart to a cast. The very common bi-valve molding process uses two molds, one for each half of the object.

Articulated molds have multiple pieces that come together to form the complete mold, and then disassemble to release the finished casting; they are expensive, but necessary when the casting shape has complex overhangs.

Piece-molding uses a number of different molds, each creating a section of a complicated object. This is generally only used for larger and more valuable objects.

Blow molding is a manufacturing process for forming and joining hollow plastic or glass parts.

A manufacturer who makes molds is called a moldmaker. A release agent is typically used to make removal of the hardened/set substance from the mold more easily effected. Typical uses for molded plastics include molded furniture, molded household goods, molded cases, and structural materials.

== Molding methods ==
There are several types of molding methods. These include:

- Casting, the oldest term, covering a wide range of materials, especially metals
- Blow molding
- Powder metallurgy plus sintering
- Compression molding
- Extrusion molding
- Injection molding
- Laminating
  - Reaction injection molding
- Matrix molding
- Rotational molding (or Rotomolding)
- Spin casting
- Transfer molding
- Dry Molded Fiber/Dry molding
- Thermoforming
  - Twin sheet thermoforming
  - Vacuum forming, a simplified version of thermoforming
- Fiberglass molding
  - Hand lay up moulding
  - Resin-transfer molding
  - Vacuum assisted resin transfer molding
  - Bladder moulding
  - Spray up molding
  - Reaction injection molding

== Gallery ==
Injection molding die with side pulls

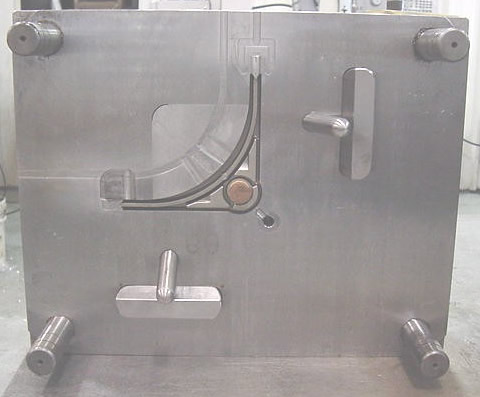
"A" side of die for glass-filled acetal with 2 side pulls

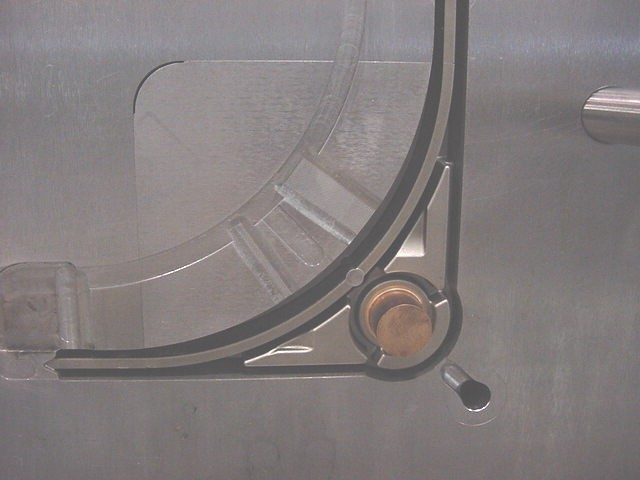
Close up of removable insert in "A" side

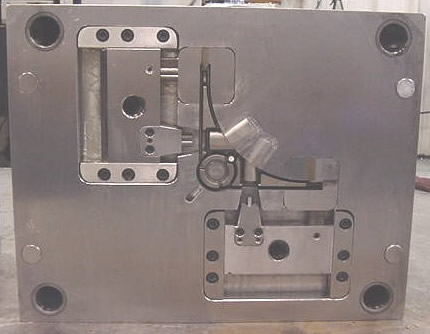
"B" side of die with side pull actuators

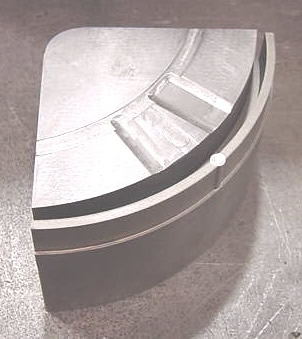
Insert removed from die

== See also ==
- Blow molding
- Forming
- Injection molding machine
- Pressing
- Stone mold
