= Hy-Bor =

Blend of boron fiber and carbon fiber

Hy-Bor is a trademarked brand of hybrid composite materials that combines boron fiber and carbon fiber in a unidirectional prepreg. The portfolio was introduced to the commercial market in 1993 by Textron Specialty Materials and currently marketed by Specialty Materials. The material's unique combination of constituent properties for fiber-reinforced composites has led to adoption in aerospace, sporting goods, and space applications.

== History ==
In 1990, Tonen Chemical Corporation applied for and was awarded a patent which described a process for combining both boron fiber and carbon fiber into a unidirectional prepreg to enhance both strength and elastic modulus. Textron Specialty Materials commercialized Hy-Bor in 1993, initially offering combinations of 3-mil (76 micron) or 4-mil (100 micron) boron fiber with various carbon fibers, including Toray T300, Hexcel IM7, and Syensqo T650 carbon fibers, using thermoset toughened epoxies and thermoplastic polyimides.

Textron divested their composites division in 2001 to Specialty Materials, Inc., the only commercial Hy-Bor offerings were a full-count 208-fiber per inch and low count 100-fiber per inch prepregs. Both laminates used 4-mil (100 micron) boron fiber with Mitsubishi MR40 and Newport 301 resin. This portfolio was renamed Gen 1 Hy-Bor as a second-generation Hy-Bor development program began in 2019.

=== Gen 2 Hy-Bor ===
In late 2019, shortly before Specialty Materials, Inc. was acquired by Global Materials, Inc., the Gen 2 Hy-Bor development project started in partnership with Toray Advanced Composites. This program focused on development of high-performance composites combining 4-mil boron fiber, Toray T1100G carbon fiber, and various Toray toughened epoxies, bismaleimides, cyanate esters, and polyimides.

== Applications ==
=== Aerospace ===
Hy-Bor has found significant utilization in multiple military unmanned aerial vehicles (UAV) programs.

In 1995, General Atomics introduced their RQ-1 Predator reconnaissance UAV program. By winter 2000, the Central Intelligence Agency sought to retrofit Predator airframes to carry and deploy AGM-114 Hellfire missiles and other ordnance with a MQ-1 program. General Atomics utilized Hy-Bor to increase both stiffness and compression strength for the upper wing spar cap to enable the upgrade. The MQ-1C Gray Eagle and MQ-9 Reaper also feature Hy-Bor for wing spar performance and light-weighting.

=== Sporting Goods ===
In 1998, R.L. Winston Rod Co., a manufacturer of fly fishing rods in Twin Bridges, Montana, launched the BL5 rod with used "breakthrough" boron/graphite composite technology which utilized the higher modulus and compression properties in the butt section for improved high line speeds.

Also in 1998, Team Rahal used Hy-Bor to increase downforce of their superspeedway wing by 4% while also making it "thinner, lighter, stronger, and stiffer" on their Reynard 98I.

Calfee Design, a La Selva Beach, California manufacturer of carbon fiber bicycle products, launched their Dragonfly bike in late 2001 featuring Hy-Bor tubing in key design locations to eliminate more than 10% of the total bike weight.

For the 2022 holiday season, Bauer Hockey unveiled the AG5NT stick featuring the Specialty Materials' logo and describes boron fiber and carbon fiber technology enabling their lightest stick which "delivers the quickest Bauer release ever." Bauer holds exclusive rights for Hy-Bor and boron fiber in hockey. For the 2023 holiday season, Bauer launched the PROTO-R powered by BORON enabling improved light-weighting and compression properties.

=== Space ===
While not specifically marketed as Hy-Bor, hybrid boron/carbon fiber prepregs have been used as a structural composite in spaceborne applications.

The James Webb Space Telescope's Integrated Science Instrument Module uses hybrid boron/high-modulus carbon fiber composites in its kinematic mounts to achieve zero coefficient of thermal expansion (CTE) in connection between the primary mirror backplane and the sensor packages.

== Technical Characteristics ==
Hy-Bor is created by adding boron fiber into carbon-fiber reinforced polymers, combining the high compressive strength of boron fiber with the tensile properties of carbon fiber for use in composites to increase compression strength, stiffness, decrease part weight and thickness, control coefficient of thermal expansion, and improve mechanical damping. Boron fiber volume is varied for selective reinforcement.
