= Boron fiber =

Amorphous elemental boron product

Boron fiber or boron filament is an amorphous product which represents the major industrial use of elemental boron. Boron fiber manifests a combination of high strength and high elastic modulus.

A common use of boron fibers is in the construction of high-tensile-strength tapes. Boron fiber use results in high-strength, lightweight materials that are used chiefly for advanced aerospace structures as a component of composite materials, as well as limited-production consumer and sporting goods such as golf clubs and fishing rods.

One of the uses of boron-fiber composites was the horizontal tail surfaces of the F-14 Tomcat fighter. This was done because carbon-fiber composites were not then developed to the point they could be used, as they were in many subsequent aircraft designs. Boron fiber is a primary reinforcement constituent in Hy-Bor, a prepreg blend of boron fiber and carbon fiber primarily used for high-performance aerospace and sporting-goods applications.

In the production process, elemental boron is deposited on an even tungsten wire substrate, which produces diameters of 100–150 microns. It consists of a fully borided tungsten core with amorphous boron.

Boron fibers and sub-millimeter-sized crystalline boron springs are produced by laser-assisted chemical vapor deposition. Translation of the focused laser beam allows one to produce complex helical structures. Such structures show good mechanical properties (elastic modulus 450 GPa, fracture strain 3.7%, fracture stress 17 GPa) and can be applied as reinforcement of ceramics or in micromechanical systems.
