= B-staging =

B-staging is a process that utilizes heat or UV light to remove the majority of solvent from an adhesive, thereby allowing a construction to be “staged”. In between adhesive application, assembly and curing, the product can be held for a period of time, without sacrificing performance.

Attempts to use traditional epoxies in IC packaging often created expensive production bottlenecks, because, as soon as the epoxy adhesive was applied, the components had to be assembled and cured immediately. B-staging eliminates these bottlenecks by allowing the IC manufacturing to proceed efficiently, with each step performed on larger batches of product.

B stage laminates are also used in the electronic circuit board industry, where the laminates are reinforced with woven glass fibers called prepregs. This allows manufacturers to have clean and accurate setup for multilayer pressing of cores and prepregs for production of PCBs, without the need to hassle with liquid uncured epoxies.
