= Reinforcement (composite) =

Constituent of a composite material which increases tensile strength

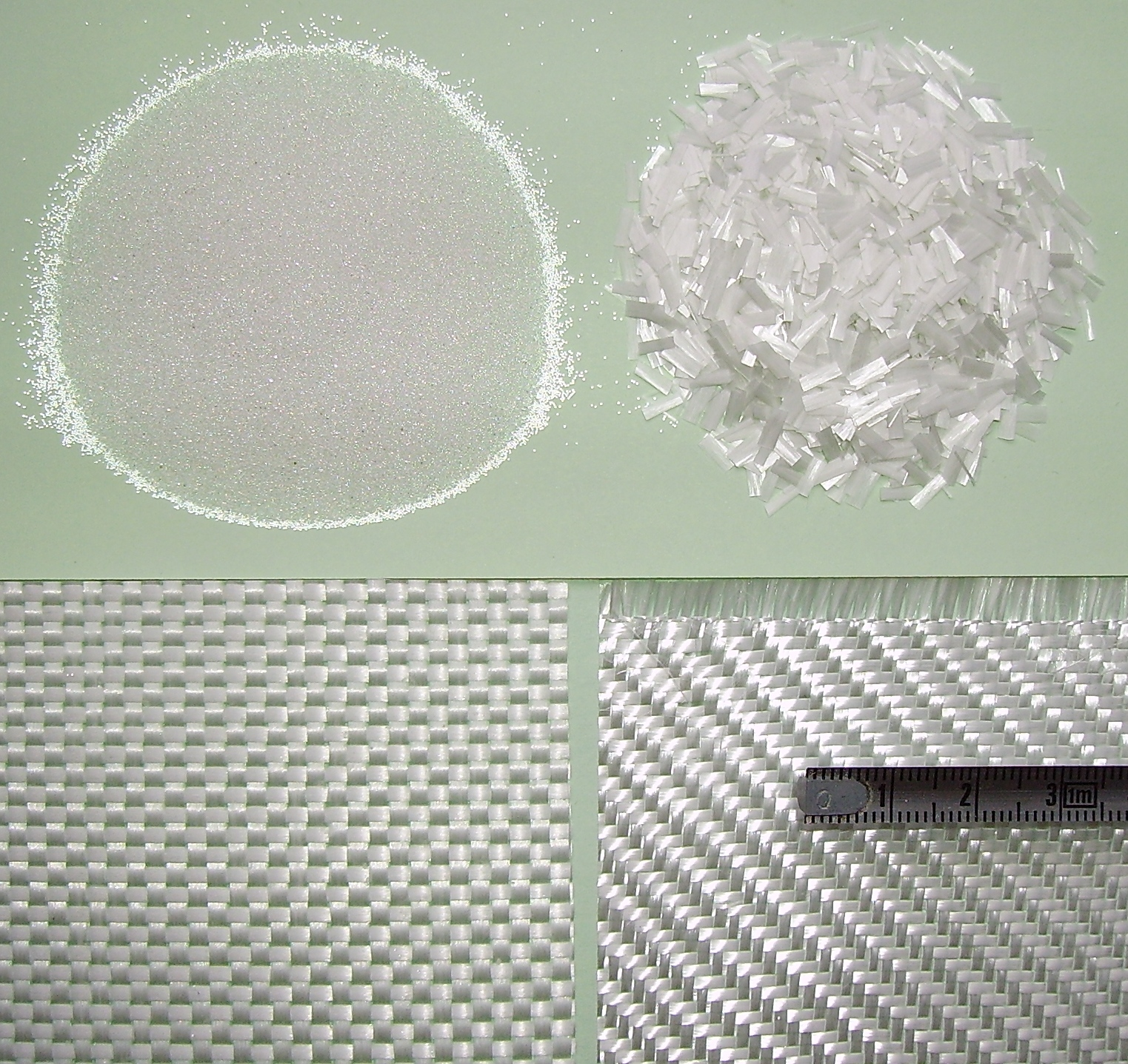
Differences in the way the fibres are laid out give different strengths and ease of manufacture.

In materials science, reinforcement is a constituent of a composite material which increases the composite's stiffness and tensile strength.

== Function ==
Following are the functions of the reinforcement in a composite:

- It increases the mechanical properties of the composite.
- It provides strength and stiffness to the composite in one direction as reinforcement carries the load along the length of the fibre.

== Fiber reinforcement ==
Crack propagation is prevented considerably, while rigidity is added normally by the reinforcement. Thin fibers can have very high strength, and they can increase substantially the overall properties of the composite provided they are linked mechanically to the matrix.

Fiber-reinforced composites have two types, and they are short fibre-reinforced and continuous fiber-reinforced. Sheet moulding and compression moulding operations usually use the long and short fibers. These are available in the form of chips, flakes and random mate (which also can be produced from a continuous fibre laid randomly till the desired thickness of the laminate/ply is attained).

A laminated or layered structure is usually constituted in continuous reinforced materials. The continuous and woven fiber styles are usually available in various forms, being pre-impregnated with the given matrix (resin), dry, uni-directional tapes of different widths, plain weave, harness satins, braided, and stitched.

Reinforcement uses some of the common fibers such as carbon fibres, cellulose (wood/paper fibre and straw), glass fibers and high strength polymers, for example, aramid. For high-temperature applications, Silicon carbide fibers are used.

== Particle reinforcement ==
Particle reinforcement adds a similar effect to precipitation hardening in metals and ceramics. Large particles prevent dislocation movement and crack propagation as well as contribute to the composite's Young's modulus. In general, particle reinforcement effect on Young's Modulus lies between values predicted by

$E_c = \frac{E_\alpha E_\beta}{(V_\alpha E_\beta + V_\beta E_\alpha)}$

as a lower bound and

$E_c = V_\alpha E_\alpha + V_\beta E_\beta$

as an upper bound.

Therefore, it can be expressed as a linear combination of contribution from the matrix and some weighted contribution from the particles.

$E_c = V_m E_m + K_c V_p E_p$

Where K_{c} is an experimentally derived constant between 0 and 1. This range of values for K_{c} reflects that particle reinforced composites are not characterized by the isostrain condition.

Similarly, the tensile strength can be modeled in an equation of similar construction where K_{s} is a similarly bounded constant not necessarily of the same value of K_{c}

$(T.S.)_c = V_m (T.S.)_m + K_s V_p (T.S.)_p$

The true value of K_{c} and K_{s} vary based on factors including particle shape, particle distribution, and particle/matrix interface. Knowing these parameters, the mechanical properties can be modeled based on effects from grain boundary strengthening, dislocation strengthening, and Orowan strengthening.

The most common particle reinforced composite is concrete, which is a mixture of gravel and sand usually strengthened by addition of small rocks or sand. Metals are often reinforced with ceramics to increase strength at the cost of ductility. Finally polymers and rubber are often reinforced with carbon black, commonly used in auto tires.

== See also ==
- High strain composite structure
