= Fiber volume ratio =

Mathematical element in composite engineering

Fiber volume ratio is an important mathematical element in composite engineering. Fiber volume ratio, or fiber volume fraction, is the percentage of fiber volume in the entire volume of a fiber-reinforced composite material. When manufacturing polymer composites, fibers are impregnated with resin. The amount of resin to fiber ratio is calculated by the geometric organization of the fibers, which affects the amount of resin that can enter the composite. The impregnation around the fibers is highly dependent on the orientation of the fibers and the architecture of the fibers. The geometric analysis of the composite can be seen in the cross-section of the composite. Voids are often formed in a composite structure throughout the manufacturing process and must be calculated into the total fiber volume fraction of the composite. The fraction of fiber reinforcement is very important in determining the overall mechanical properties of a composite. A higher fiber volume fraction typically results in better mechanical properties of the composite.

Calculating the volume of fiber ratio in a composite is relatively simple. The volume fiber fraction can be calculated using a combination of weights, densities, elastic moduli, stresses in respective directions, Poisson's ratios, and volumes of the matrix (resin system), fibers, and voids.

$V_f = \frac{v_f}{v_c}\!$

where:

$V_f$ is the fiber volume ratio

and

$v_f$ is the volume of fibers
$v_c$ is the volume of the composite

== Methods to Determine Fiber Volume Fractions ==
=== Acid Digestion ===
This procedure involves the digestion of the polymer matrix using an acid which does not attack the fibers. Following digestion, the remaining fibers are washed, dried, and weighed. Knowing the initial weight of the composite specimen as well as the densities of the fiber and resin, the volume fraction of both the fiber and matrix in the original laminate may be determined. This method is generally used for composites composed of carbon fiber reinforcement.

=== Optical microscopy-based techniques ===
Optical microscopy-based techniques involve potting sectioned samples of the laminate, polished using standard metallographic techniques, and obtaining digital cross-sectional photomicrographs using an optical microscope and magnifications between 100 and 2500. Digital images may be recorded at a number of locations along the length and through-the-thickness of the laminate. Computer programs aid in the analysis of fiber ratio in the photomicrograph of the polished composite specimen. This method is preferred as a non-destructive approach to determining fiber volume fraction.

=== Resin Burning-off Method ===
This method involves heating up the composite to a temperature at which resin will melt and fibers remain stable, burning off resin and weighing fibers, the volume fraction can be calculated from the initial weight of composite and fiber's weight. This method is typically used with glass fibers.

== Importance of Fiber Volume Fraction ==
The amount of fiber in a fiber reinforced composite directly corresponds with the mechanical properties of the composite. Theoretically the maximum fiber ratio of round fibers that can be achieved in a composite is 90.8% if the fibers are in a unidirectional hexagonal close packed configuration. Realistically the highest fiber volume ratio is around 70% due to manufacturing parameters and is usually in the range of 50% to 65%. Adding too little fiber reinforcement in the composite will actually deteriorate the properties of the material. Too much fiber volume may also decrease the strength of the composite due to the lack of space for the matrix to fully surround and bond with the fibers. Therefore, there is an optimal space between fibers that will fully exploit the uniform load transfer between fibers. Given the fiber volume fraction, the theoretical elastic properties of a composite can be determined. The elastic modulus of a composite in the fiber direction of a unidirectional composite can be calculated using the following equation:

$E = (1-{V_f}){E_m}+{V_f}{E_f}$

Where:

$V_f$ is the fiber volume ratio

and

$E_m$ is the elastic modulus of the matrix
$E_f$ is the elastic modulus of the fibers

== Common Fiber Packing Arrangements ==
Fibers are commonly arranged in a square or hexagonal lattice as well as in a layer-wise fiber array. Assuming that each fiber has a circular cross-sectional with the same diameter, the fiber volume fraction of these two kinds of packing are respectively:

Hexagonal

${V_f}= ({\frac{\pi}{2\sqrt3}}){(\frac{r}{R})^2}$

Square

${V_f}= ({\frac{\pi}{4}}){(\frac{r}{R})^2}$

where:

$r$ is the radius of fiber

and

$2R$ is the center to center spacing of the fibers.

The maximum fiber volume fraction will occur when the fibers are touching, i.e. r=R. For a hexagonal array $V_{f,max}$ = 0.907, and for square packing $V_{f,max}$ = 0.785.

However, these are ideal situations only used for theoretical analysis. In practical cases there can be variation in fiber diameter and irregular packing. In practice, it's hard to achieve a volume fraction greater than 0.7 and this must be regarded as the realistic limit for commercial materials.

In the production process, using different fiber architecture methods can obtain different volume fractions. 2D aligned unidirectional fabrics with pre-preg (usually carbon) fibers are considered to have the highest volume fraction among common fiber architectures. Filament winding is also usually associated with high fiber volume fractions – with careful control of fiber tension and resin content, values of around 70% are possible.

== Void Volume Fraction ==
Porosity or void fraction is a measure of the void (i.e., "empty") spaces in a material, and is a fraction of the volume of voids over the total volume, between 0 and 1, or as a percentage between 0 and 100%. There are many ways to determine if a composite part contains voids, such as industrial CT scanning or ultrasound. If the volume fraction of the fibers and matrix is known, the volume voids can also be found using the following equation:

$V_v = 1 - V_f - V_m = \frac {v_v}{v_c} \!$

where:

$V_v$ is the void volume ratio

and

$V_f$ is the fiber volume ratio
$V_m$ is the matrix volume ratio
$v_v$ is the volume of voids
$v_c$ is the volume of the composite

Another equation used to calculate void volume fraction is:

$V_v = \frac {({p_{ct}}-{p_{cm}})}{p_{ct}} \!$

where:

$V_v$ is the void volume ratio

and

$p_{ct}$ is the theoretical density of the composite without voids

$p_{cm}$ is the measured density of the composite

=== Measuring Void Content ===
There are many methods of evaluating the void content of materials (including composites). The first is to exam a polished section, identifying the voids in the section, either manually or using computer-aid analysis and determining the area fraction which corresponds to the volume fraction of the composite.

Another method requires accurate measurement of the density of the sample and comparing it to the theoretical density in the equation described in the previous section. The density is determined by weighing the sample in air and then in a liquid of known density. Application of Archimedes’ principle leads to the following expression for the measured density of the sample in terms of measured weight, where subscripts “a” and “L” refer to water and liquid, respectively:

$p = \frac {(W_{apL}-W_{Lpa})}{(W_a-W_L)} \!$

Where:

$p$ is the measured density of the composite sample

and

$W_{apL}$ is the weight of composite in air
$W_{Lpa}$ is the weight of composite in liquid
$W_a$ is the weight of air
$W_L$ is the weight of liquid

The liquid used in this method should have a high density and chemical stability and low vapour pressure and surface tension. The most popular liquid currently in use is perfluoro- 1 - methyl decalin.
