= Plastic lumber =

Building material

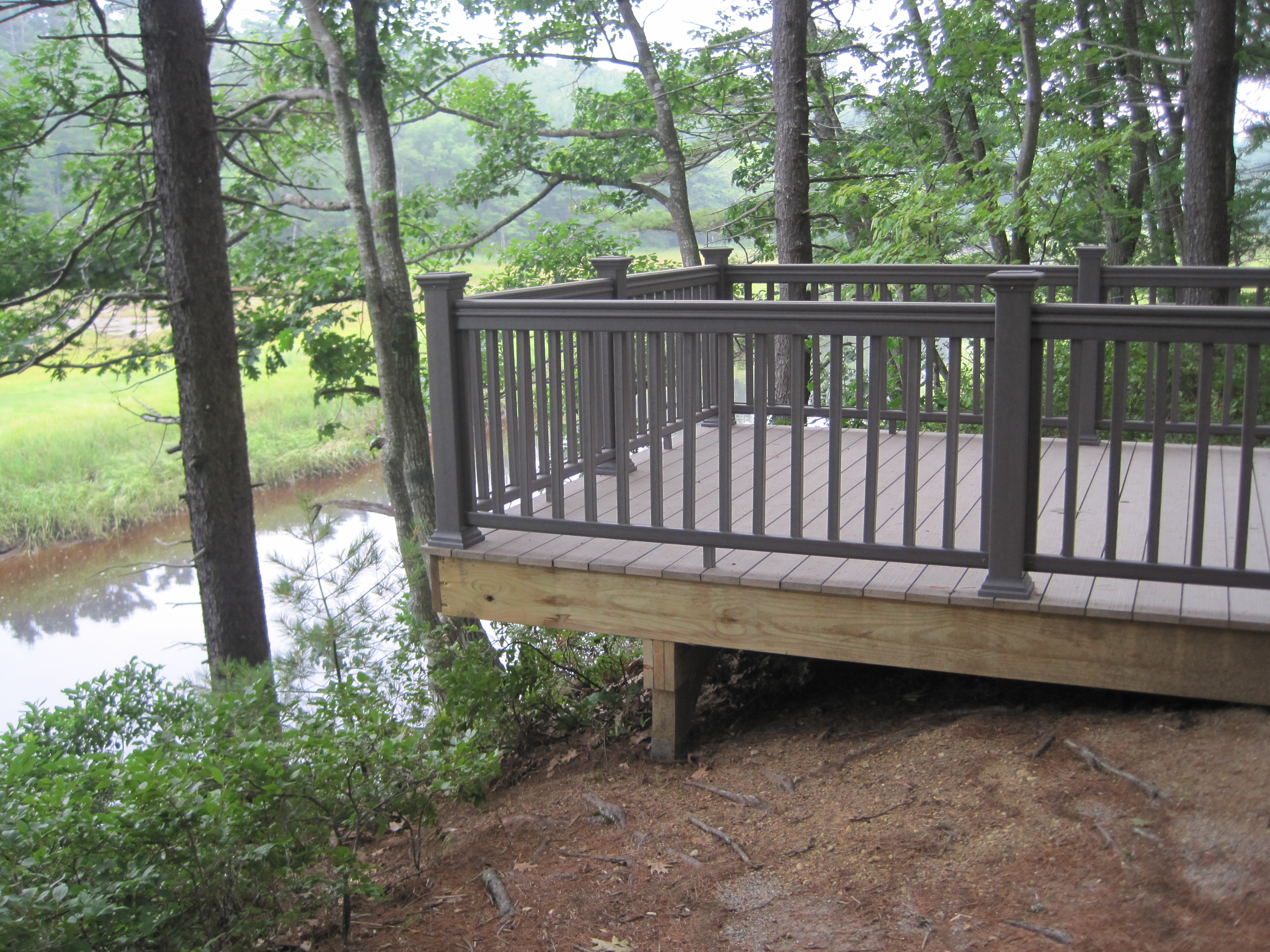
Recycled plastic composite lumber observation deck at the Rachel Carson National Wildlife Refuge.

Plastic lumber is a plastic form of lumber made of virgin or recycled plastic. It is mostly made of plastic and binders such as fiberglass or rebar; not to be confused with wood-plastic composite lumber. Widely employed in outdoor decking, it is also used for molding and trim and garden furniture such as park benches. Resistant to cracking and splitting when appropriately installed, plastic lumber can be molded with or without simulated wood grain details. Even with a wood grain design, plastic lumber is still easy to distinguish visually from natural timber: the grains are the same uniform color as the rest of the material.

Manufacturers claim plastic lumber is more environmentally-friendly and requires less maintenance than wood/plastic composites or rot-resistant wood. Commercially available polyvinyl chloride fiberglass composite lumber sold for decking meets stringent fire code standards. Plastic lumber can displace wood timber (as harvested by forestry).

== Production ==
Plastic lumber is composed of virgin or waste plastics including HDPE, PVC, PP, ABS, PS and PLA. The powder or pellets are mixed to a dough-like consistency at roughly 400 °F (204 °C) and then extruded or molded to the desired shape. Additives such as colorants, coupling agents, stabilizers, blowing agents, reinforcing agents, foaming agents, and lubricants help tailor the end product to the target application. The material is formed into both solid and hollow profiles or into injection molded parts and products.

Resin, regrind, and most of the additives are combined and processed in a pelletizing extruder. The new material pellets are formed in a mold and cooled.

== Properties ==
Plastic lumber can be molded to meet almost any desired spatial condition, a major advantage over wood. It can also be bent and fixed to form strong arching curves. Plastic lumber works like wood - it can be shaped, drilled, and cut using conventional woodworking tools. At the same time, it is waterproof and resists all types of rot and mold, although it is not as rigid as wood and may slightly deform in extremely hot weather. Plastic lumber is not sensitive to staining from a variety of agents. A major selling point of this material is it doesn't need to be painted and is overall low-maintenance. It is manufactured in a variety of colors, and is widely available in grays and earth tones.

While the compressive properties of plastic lumber are equal or greater than those of wood, the modulus of elasticity is very low. Moreover, plastic lumber is subject to far more creep than wood. Use in load-bearing structures requires different considerations from wood.

Some plastic lumber, such as commercially available polyvinyl chloride plastic decking fiberglass composite lumber, outperformed composite wood polyethylene composite lumbers in fire safety performance. Pure plastic lumber, without fiberglass composite structure, also deforms easily at high temperature; planning for the event of fire needs to take this into account.

== Standards ==
ASTM has standardized test methods to measure the properties of plastic lumber:

- D 1929, Standard Test Method for Determining Ignition Temperature of Plastics, to address building code fire safety acceptance criteria;
- D 6108, Standard Test Method for Compressive Properties of Plastic Lumber and Shapes;
- D 6109, Standard Test Method for Flexural Properties of Unreinforced and Reinforced Plastic Lumber;
- D 6111, Standard Test Method for Bulk Density and Specific Gravity of Plastic Lumber and Shapes by Displacement;
- D 6112, Standard Test Methods for Compressive and Flexural Creep and Creep-Rupture of Plastic Lumber and Shapes;
- D 6117, Standard Test Methods for Mechanical Fasteners in Plastic Lumber and Shapes;
- D 6341, Standard Test Method for Determination of the Linear Coefficient of Thermal Expansion of Plastic Lumber and Plastic Lumber Shapes Between –30 and 140 °F (-34.4 and 60 °C);
- D 6435, Standard Test Method for Shear Properties of Plastic Lumber and Plastic Lumber Shapes; and
- E 108, Fire Tests of Roof Coverings, for fire safety performance testing.

== Applications ==
Plastic lumber is used in such applications as:

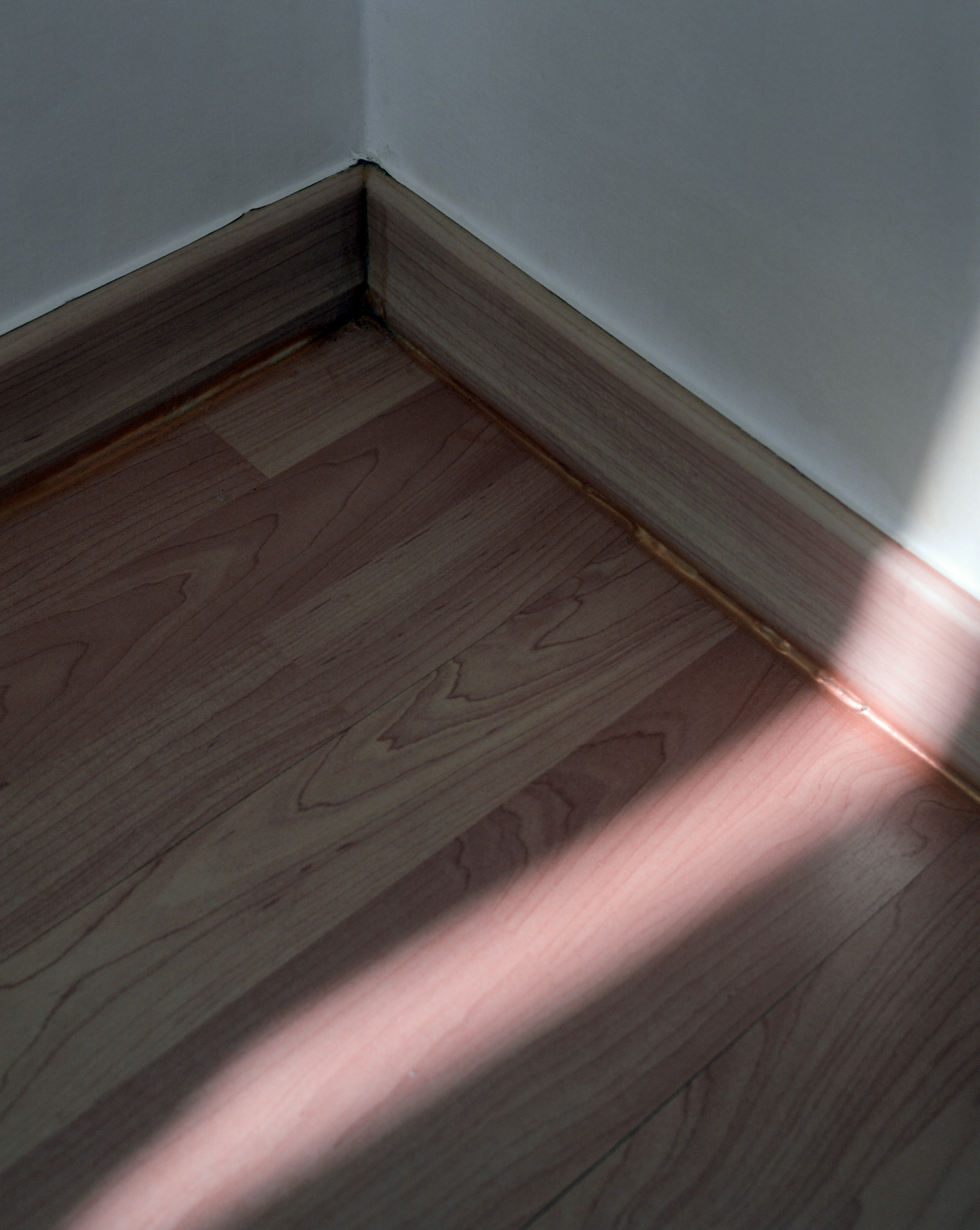
Most plastic lumber in decks is used as flooring.

- Deck floors
- Railings
- Fences
- Landscaping timbers
- Cladding and siding
- Park benches
- Molding and trim
- Window and door frames
- Industrial Cribbing
- Indoor and Outdoor garden furniture
- Marine Walls and Piling

== See also ==
- Engineered wood
- Fiber reinforced composite
