= Short fiber reinforced blends =

Short Fiber Reinforced Blends are partial case of ternary composites, i.e. composites prepared of three ingredients. In particular they can be considered as a combination of an immiscible polymer blend and a short fiber reinforced composite. These blends have the potential to integrate the easy processing solutions available for short fiber reinforced composites with the high mechanical performance of continuous fiber reinforced composites. The performance of these complex, ternary systems is controlled by their morphology.

Depending on the aspect ratio of the filler particles (length/diameter) and their compatibility to the polymeric components one can achieve different morphologies: (i) filler contained within the dispersed phase, (ii) within the matrix phase or (iii) at the interface between the two phases. If the fibers are sufficiently long and are preferentially wetted by the dispersed phase an effectively continuous network consisting of fibers welded together by the dispersed phase can be created. In such manner a pseudo-continuous fibrous reinforcement is spontaneously formed during the processing step and a composite material with better mechanical performance can be obtained.

== See also ==
- Composite materials
