= Lignocellulosic filler reinforced polymer =

A lignocellulosic filler reinforced polymer is a composite material made through the combination of vegetal fibres or particles (also called "fillers") and a matrix of organic polymers. Composites are designed to improve the mechanical properties and lower the impact on the environment. Fillers perform the role of bridges for stress transfer inside the material, permitting them to sustain higher loads. At the same time, adding a filler inside a material leads to the reduction of the percentage of polymer used in the synthesis of said material. By lowering plastic use, composites allow for a reduction of both their carbon footprint and the cost related to their fabrication.

== Lignocellulosic fillers ==
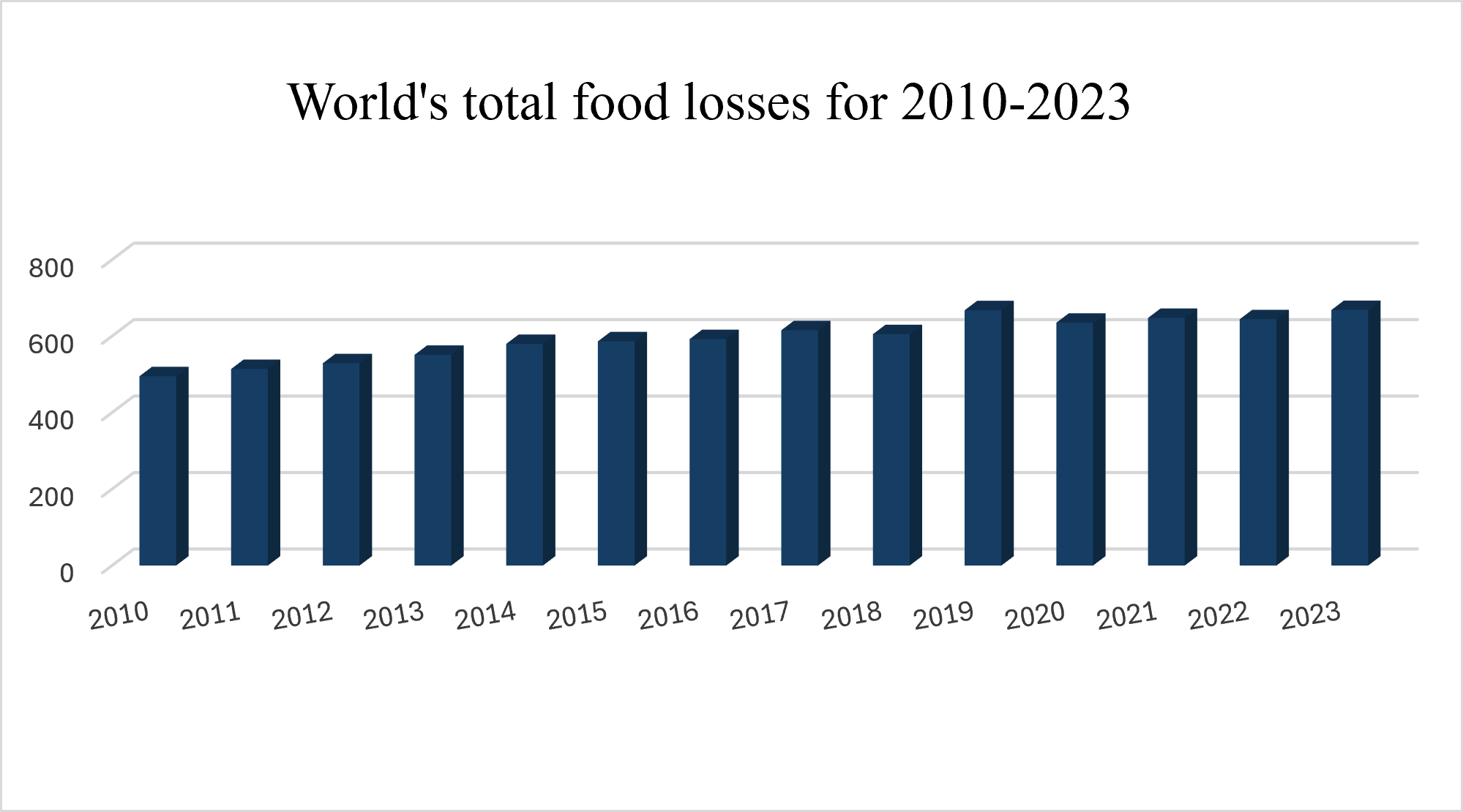
Trend of the total food losses around the world divided by year (2010-2023).

Lignocellulosic fillers are organic materials coming from plant sources, like leaves, stalks, or food shells, peels and seeds. The majority of them are sourced from agri-food residues or wastes and find a new end-of-life in the formulation of biodegradable biocomposites. They are primarily composed of three organic polymers, namely lignin, cellulose and hemicellulose. The plant cells composing the fillers present an outer thin primary wall which is made of all these three organic polymers plus pectin. Internally a secondary wall exists, whose composition accounts of around 45% cellulose, 20% hemicellulose and 25% of lignin. Lignin is responsible for tying together the other polymers and strongly binding them together. Food waste production around the world has been almost stable in the last years, with just a barely increasing trend. The major sources of waste come from maize and rice products, cassava, potatoes, sugar cane, fruits and vegetables. Despite being considered as wastes, these residues showed great potential in strengthening polymers, demonstrating the possibility to grant a new purpose to products that otherwise would be discarded.

=== Morphology ===
Filler morphology could change according to the desired final use. In most applications, fillers are used as one of the following conditions:

- as particles
- as fibers
- as they are without further modifications

The sizing of the filler is decided upon use in accordance with the polymeric matrix they are coupled with. To achieve better adherence and stability of the final composite, in many instances fillers are reduced to dimensions in the order of micrometers (μm). Typical fibre fillers have measures around 300 μm to 500 μm, showing an aspect ratio (L/D) around 3. Particles, instead, found applications in smaller dimensions around 100 μm. Smaller filler diameters, such as 1 μm, were incorporated more easily inside the matrices, but the decrease in particle size could pose the risk of particles becoming airborne. Small particulate powders present a fire hazard and the high temperature required for the processing of polymers presents the risk of igniting the powder and ultimately exploding.

=== Thermal degradation ===
The filler as well as the polymeric matrix are processed at high temperature to permit their blend and further molding. This increase in temperatures is related to the thermal degradation that can take effect to both the filler and polymer. Thermal degradation happens when a material is subjected to a high enough temperature that a chemical decomposition takes place. Since filler and polymers have different degradation temperatures, with the former being lower, processes are usually set to perform under polymer's melt temperatures. Generally, for lignocellulosic fillers the degradation region starts at 150 °C and ends at 180 °C. From 200 °C to 300 °C they fall into the char production region and in the 300-360 °C in the pyrolysis front formation region. As such, usually, fillers are subjected to thermal degradation during the composite synthesis. Filler degradation endangers the structural integrity of the final material and could also even lower the mechanical properties instead of increasing them as desired.

=== Treatment methods ===
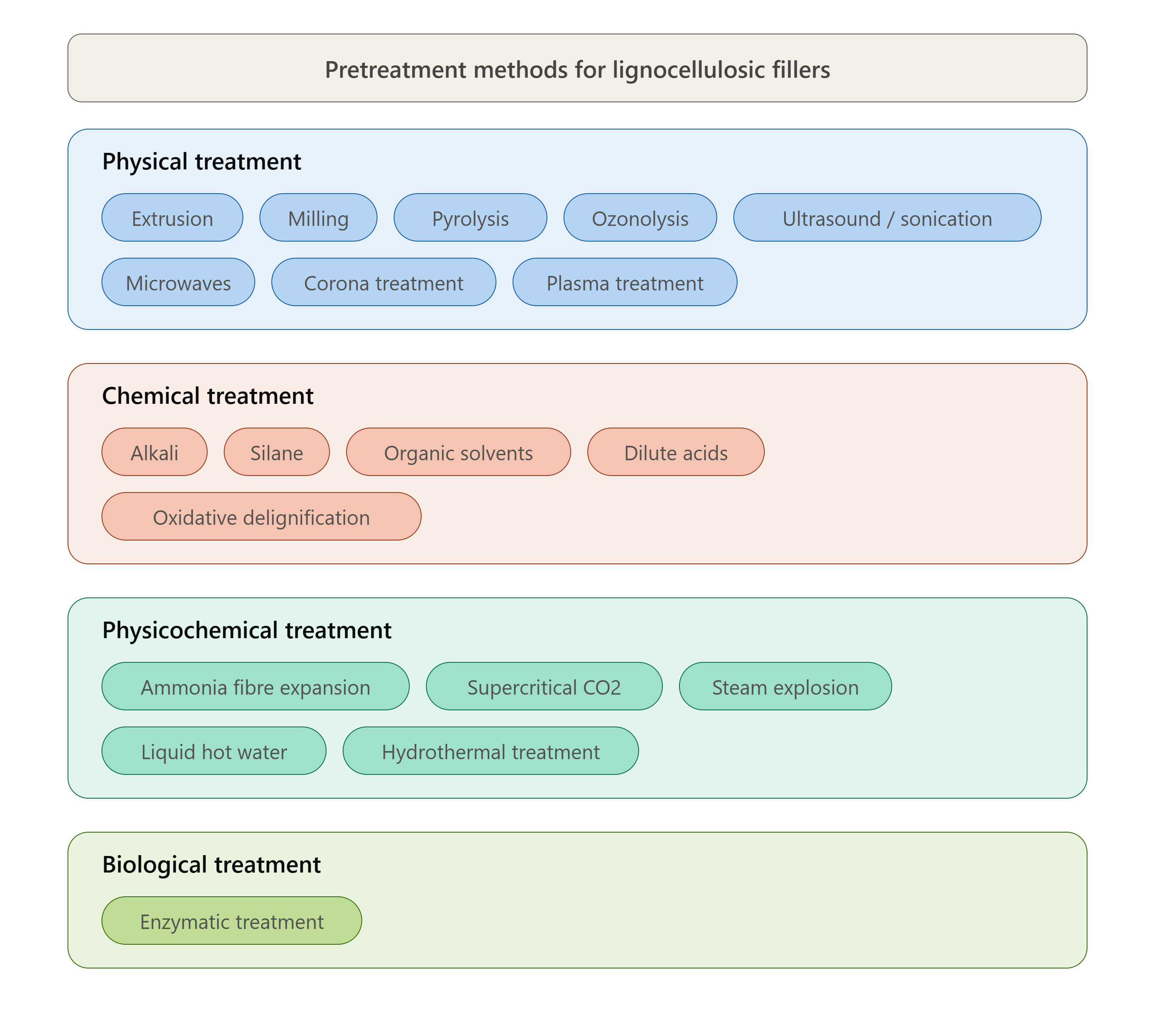
The scheme depicts a part of the possible pretreatment methods to process lignocellulosic fillers.

Lignocellulosic materials are hydrophilic in nature, whereas the employed polymers are hydrophobic and non-polar. This discrepancy is responsible for the difficulty in merging polymers and fillers in one composite material. For this reason, fillers undergo one or more pretreatment methods to remove impurities which remained on the external surface after washing and to expose the hydroxyl (OH) groups present on the filler's backbone. Increasing the number of hydroxyl groups affects the ability to form more interfacial bonds and permits a better adhesion between fillers and polymers. A large number of pretreatments exist, among them the largest categories are physical processing, chemical treatment, physicochemical processing and biological treatments.

==== Physical processing ====
Physical processing is used for both decreasing filler size and to change structural and surface properties, affecting the mechanical bonding between fillers and polymers. An important consideration is that physical methods do not change the chemical composition of the material but they only influence the surface properties.
Methods belonging to this category are extrusion, milling, pyrolysis, ozonolysis, ultrasounds, microwaves, corona and plasma treatments.

==== Chemical treatment ====
Chemical treatments can be used to change the surface structure of the filler as well as to modify its molecular structure. In doing this, different chemical compounds could be used, among which the most used are alkali and silane treatments, ionic liquids, organic solvents, dilute acids and oxidative lignification.
Sometimes, some of these chemical treatments are used in combination to further modify the filler structure. The methods see the soaking of the lignocellulosic filler in the selected treatment solution for a specific amount of time, then they are usually washed and dried. The procedure could be repeated in more reprises according to the specific effect and desired outcome. Chemical treatments are generally considered the quickest and most effective among the treatment methods.

==== Physicochemical processing ====
Physicochemical processing is a combination of physical and chemical methods, used to reduce the filler size and implement molecular modifications at the same time. These treatments show effectiveness in the cases of delignification, depolymerization, reduction of crystallinity etc. The effects of different physical processing coupled with all the possible chemical treatments vary according to the compatibility with the filler used.

==== Biological treatments ====
Biological treatments see their use with the employment of ligninolytic enzymes to degrade and change the surface of lignocellulosic fillers. One of the main reasons to adopt their use is the fact that they are environmentally friendly techniques that do not produce toxic by-products. Additionally, the reactions are strictly specific and have focused performances. In some cases this treatment method could be more time expensive than the others and is less appealing for industrial applications.

== Reinforced polymers ==
Reinforced polymers are made from the combination of a filler and a polymer. The polymer could be of thermoplastic or thermosetting nature. The former is characterised by the ability to melt upon heating and could reshape itself, while the latter tend to form irreversible chemical bonds when heated and do not melt nor reshape upon cooling but typically decompose. In composite synthesis thermoplastic polymers are preferred in most of the cases, permitting the incorporation of lignocellulosic fillers and reforming in the desired shape upon cooling.

=== Processing ===
Before proceeding with the molding of the composite, filler and polymer are usually mixed together. According to the chosen molding process, the materials are usually either dry mixed, where the dried materials are added in a mixer, or melt blended. The latter process is typically favoured since it permits a better incorporation of the filler particles/fibres into the polymeric matrix but, as a downside, the process involves the heating of the mixture to melt the polymer and incorporate the materials. This early exposure to higher temperature could start a first degradation process on the fillers, which could potentially be further worsened during the final molding process. In spite of the disadvantage, melt blending is the primary employed method since it also permits to reduce air incorporation inside the material and showed better results in forming mechanically improved composites. The incorporation of the two materials grants a reduced void volume in the composite and filler and polymer interact with stronger bonds, permitting a more effective stress transmission from the matrix to the incorporated filler.

Among the most adopted methods in the industry for composite synthesis there are:

- compression molding
- resin transfer molding
- injection molding
- solvent casting
- rotational molding
- hand lay-up technique with compression molding

=== Untreated vs treated fillers ===
Untreated fillers present an unpolished surface that could hinder the formation of physical and chemical bonds with the polymer. Incorporation of treated fibres or particles permits higher incorporation rates without resulting in the formation of defects after molding. In addition, the treatment helps expose the hydroxyl groups on the filler surface permitting stronger binding with the polymer. These bonds are necessary when devising the formulation of a composite, since they are responsible for the stress transmission. When a load is placed in contact with the final manufactured composite, a stress is applied on its contact surface and the stress is then transmitted throughout the body of the manufacture. In the case of a homogeneous material, it is characterised by a mechanical isotropous behaviour and the stress is shared throughout all the volume propagating in all directions evenly. Whereas in the case of composites the inverse is true: the filler incorporation brings heterogeneity to the material and it becomes anisotropous. Fibres and particles hinder stress propagation and a preferential transmission direction is created inside the composite. In this case the undeterred stress propagation from the polymer to the filler, helped by the stronger chemical bonds formed, is essential to grant higher mechanical performances to the composite and to avoid fibre/particles pull-out or early material breakage due to crack propagation.

=== Coupling agents ===
Coupling agents are used to enhance the coupling of two different materials. In particular, among the most employed coupling agents methodologies feature:

- cross-linkers addition
- chain extenders incorporation
- grafting

All these methods could be adopted for composite synthesis and enhance filler-polymer compatibility, but considering the biodegradability aspect some of them present clear disadvantages. Cross-linkers form highly structured composites that could in turn require longer times for the degradation, potentially missing the time-window for the biodegradation verification. Similarly, chain extenders act on the polymer chains extension, increasing the time needed for their total degradation. On another note, grafting method has been tested and the biodegradability of grafted composites has been ascertained. Grafting is usually performed on the same polymer selected for the composite formulation and a part of the grafted polymer is added to the filler-polymer blend creating a bridge between the two. One of the most used coupling agents used in grafting is maleic anhydride, which showed also promising results in enhancing the composite mechanical properties compared to other treatments.

=== Biodegradability and compostability ===
A lot of attention is placed on the biodegradability characteristic of lignocellulosic composites. Agri-food wastes are biodegradable and compostable even after undergoing pretreatment methods. Polymers are chosen according to the desired properties but usually for composite synthesis bio-derived polymers or already assessed biodegradable polymers are selected. Biodegradability could be ascertained through different methods or standards (ISO, BS, ASTM) either in soil (ASTM D5988 or ISO 17556), compost (ASTM D5338, ISO 14855-1 or ISO 20200) or in aquatic systems (ISO 18830:2016, ISO 19679:2016 and ISO 14853:2016). Instead, to verify the compostability of a composite, it is needed to first verify its biodegradability and disintegrability (tested together with biodegradability), then the presence of specific heavy metals should be analysed and their content should be in line with the ones presented in normative EN 14995:2006.

== See also ==
- Advanced composite materials (engineering)
- Lignocellulosic biomass
- Fibre-reinforced plastic
