= Pre-preg =

Composite material

Pre-preg is a composite material made from "pre-impregnated" fibers and a partially cured polymer matrix, such as epoxy or phenolic resin, or even thermoplastic mixed with liquid rubbers or resins. The fibers often take the form of a weave and the matrix is used to bond them together and to other components during manufacture. The thermoset matrix is only partially cured to allow easy handling; this B-Stage material requires cold storage to prevent complete curing. B-Stage pre-preg is always stored in cooled areas since heat accelerates complete polymerization. Hence, composite structures built of pre-pregs will mostly require an oven or autoclave to cure. The main idea behind a pre-preg material is the use of anisotropic mechanical properties along the fibers, while the polymer matrix provides filling properties, keeping the fibers in a single system.

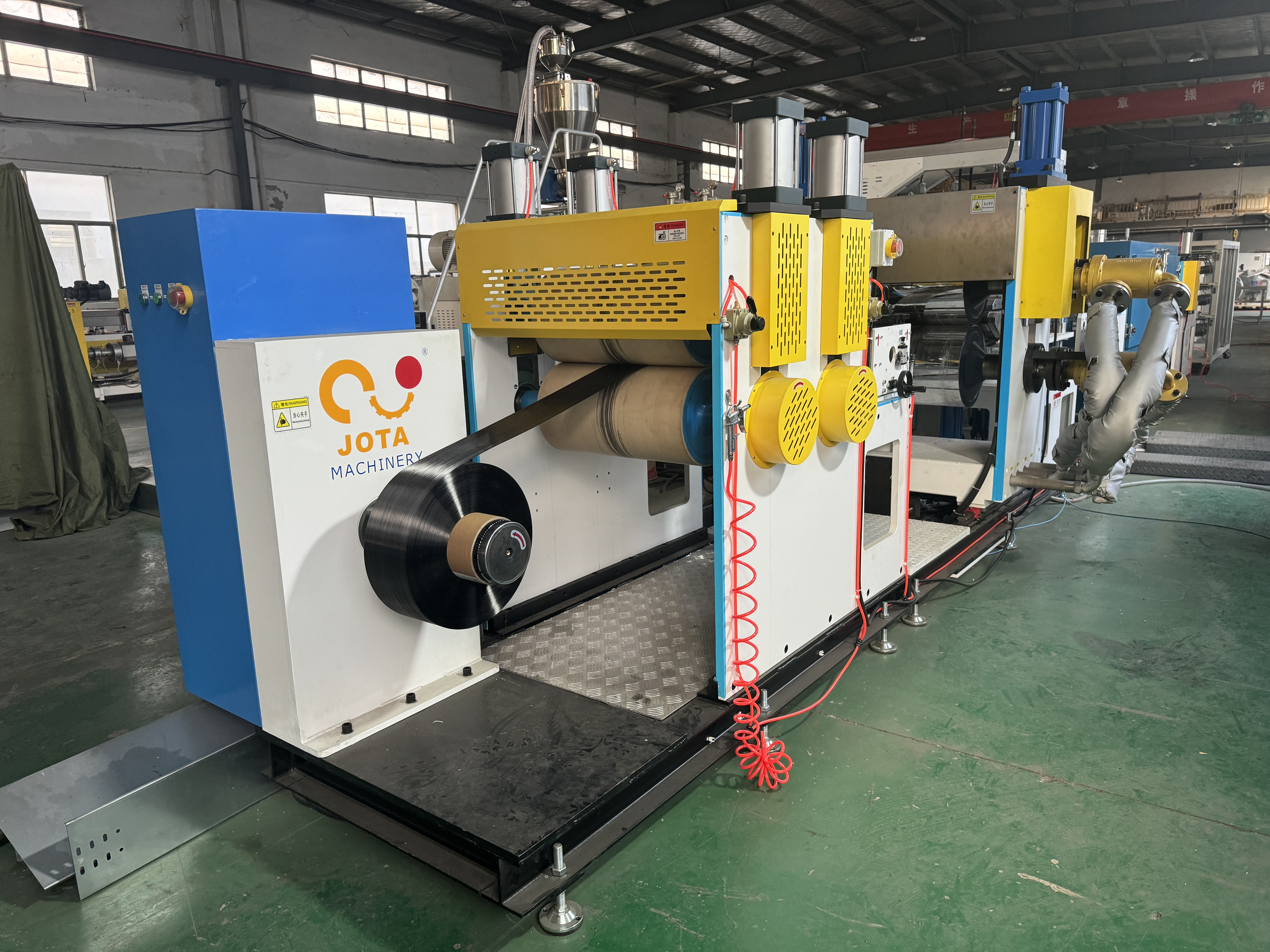
Thermoplastic CF/PEEK Prepreg

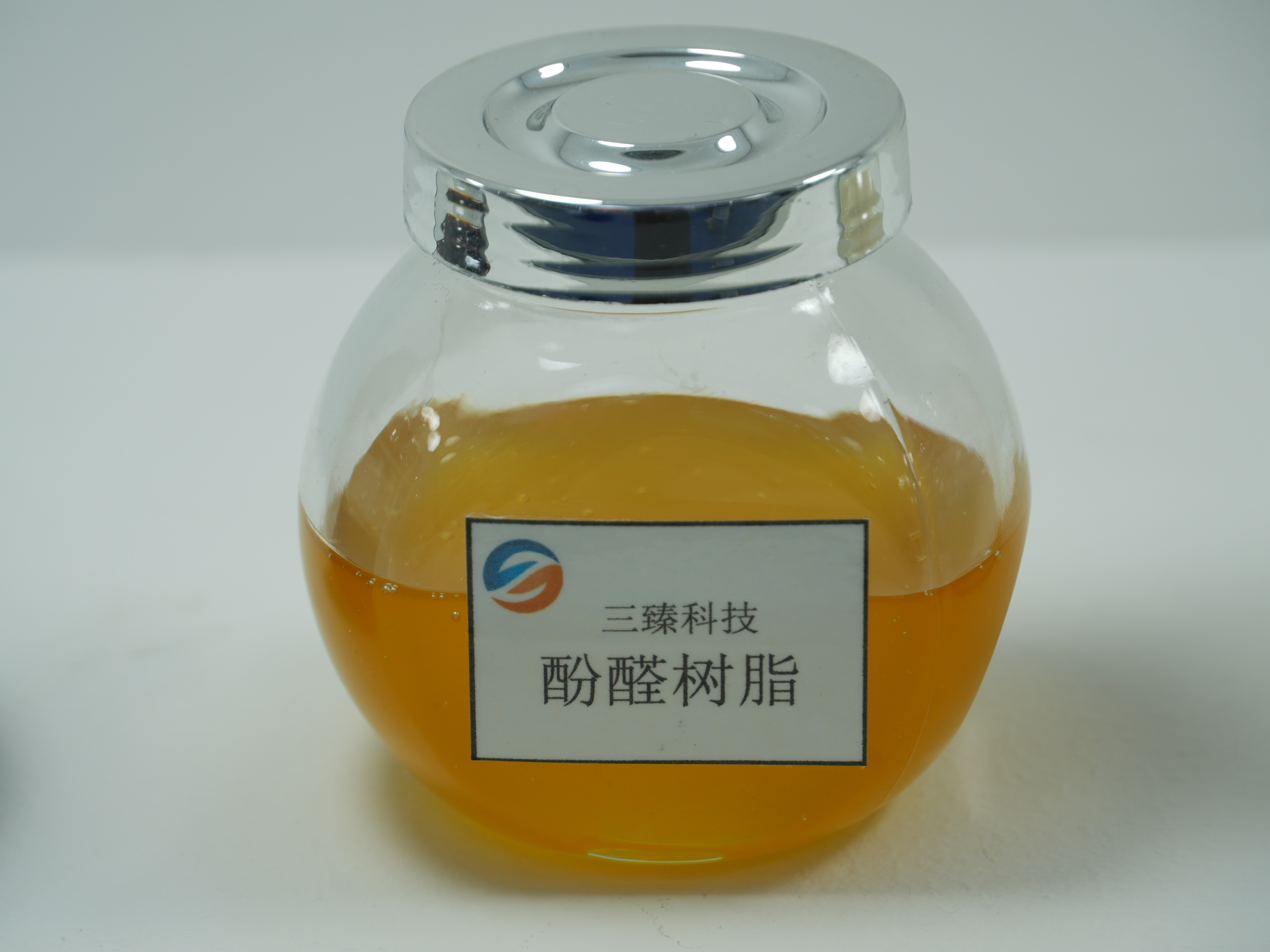
Phenolic Resin

Pre-preg allows one to impregnate the fibers on a flat workable surface, or rather in an industrial process, and then later form the impregnated fibers to a shape which could prove to be problematic for the hot injection process. Pre-preg also allows one to impregnate a bulk amount of fiber and then store it in a cooled area (below 20 °C) for an extended period of time to cure later. The process can also be time-consuming in comparison to the hot injection process and the added value for pre-preg preparation is at the stage of the material supplier.

== Areas of application ==
This technique can be utilized in the aviation industry. As in principle, prepreg has the potential to be processed batch sizes. Despite fiber glass having high applicability in aircraft specifically small aircraft motors, carbon fiber is employed in this type of industry at a higher rate, and the demand for it is increasing. For example, the characterization of Airbus A380 is handled by means of a mass fraction. This mass fraction is about 20%, and the Airbus A350XWB by a mass fraction of about 50% of carbon fiber prepregs. Carbon fiber prepregs have been used in the airfoils of the Airbus fleet for more than 20 years.

The usage of prepreg in automotive industry is used at relatively limited quantities in comparison with other techniques like automated tape lay-up and automated fiber placement. The main reason behind this is the relative high cost of prepreg fibers as well as the compounds used in molds. Example of such materials are bulk moulding compound (BMC) or sheet moulding compound (SMC).

This material is used to make the cockpit doors on the Airbus A320. This material provides bulletproofness.

== Uses of prepregs ==
There are many products that utilize the concept of prepreg among which is the following.

- Motorsport
- Space travel
- Sports equipment
- Sailing
- Orthopedic technology in orthotics as well as in prosthetics
- In electrical engineering as an "intermediate layer" in multilayer circuit boards and as insulating material for electrical machines and transformers
- Rotor blades in wind turbines

== Applicable fiber types ==
There are many fiber types that can be excellent candidates for the preparation of preimpregnated fibers. The most common fibers among these candidates are the following fibers.

- Glass fibers
- Glass cloth
- Basalt fibers
- Carbon fibers
- Aramid fibers

== Matrix ==
One distinguishes the matrix systems according to their hardening temperature and the type of resin. The curing temperature greatly influences the glass transition temperature and thus the operating temperature. Military aircraft mainly use 180 °C systems.

== Composition ==
The prepreg matrix consists of a mixture of resin and hardener, in some cases an accelerator. Freezing at -20 °C prevents the resin from reacting with the hardener. If the cold chain is interrupted, the reaction starts and the prepreg becomes unusable. There are also high-temperature prepregs which can be stored for a certain time at room temperature. These prepregs can then be cured only in an autoclave at elevated temperature.

== Resin types ==
While the main type of resins used are based on epoxy resin, vinyl ester-based prepregs are also available. Since vinyl ester resins must be pre-accelerated with amine accelerator or cobalt, their processing time at room temperature is shorter than with epoxy-based prepregs. Catalysts (also called hardeners) include peroxides such as methyl ethyl ketone peroxide (MEKP), acetyl acetone peroxide (AAP) or cyclohexanone peroxide (CHP). Vinyl ester resin is used under high impact stress.

== Resin properties ==
The properties of the resin and fiber constituents influence the evolution of VBO (vacuum-bag-only) prepreg microstructures during cure. Generally, however, fiber properties and fiber bed architectures are standardized, whereas matrix properties drive both prepreg and process development. The dependence of microstructural evolution on resin properties, therefore, is critical to understand, and has been investigated by numerous authors. The presence of dry prepreg areas may suggest a need for low viscosity resins. However, Ridgard explains that VBO prepreg systems are designed to remain relatively viscous in the early stages of cure to impede infiltration and allow sufficient dry areas to persist for air evacuation to occur. Because the room temperature vacuum holds used to evacuate air from VBO systems are sometimes measured in hours or days, it is critical for the resin viscosity to inhibit cold flow, which could prematurely seal the air evacuation pathways. However, the overall viscosity profile must also permit sufficient flow at cure temperature to fully impregnate the prepreg, lest pervasive dry areas remain in the final part. Furthermore, Boyd and Maskell argue that to inhibit bubble formation and growth at low consolidation pressures, both the viscous and elastic characteristics of the prepreg must be tuned to the specific processing parameters encountered during cure, and ultimately ensure that a majority of the applied pressure is transferred to the resin. Altogether, the rheological evolution of VBO resins must balance the reduction of both voids caused by entrapped gases and voids caused by insufficient flow.

== Processing ==
At room temperatures the resin reacts very slowly and if frozen will remain stable for years. Thus, prepregs can only be cured at high temperatures. They can be processed with the hot pressing technique or the autoclave technique. Through pressure the fiber volume fraction is increased in both techniques.

The best qualities can be produced with the autoclave technique. The combination of pressure and vacuum results in components with very low air inclusions.

The curing can be followed by a tempering process, which serves for complete crosslinking.

== Material advances ==
Recent advances in out of autoclave (OOA) processes hold promise for improving performance and lowering costs for composite structures. Using vacuum-bag-only (VBO) for atmospheric pressures, the new OOA processes promise to deliver less than 1 percent void content required for aerospace primary structures. Led by material scientists at Air Force Research Lab, the technique would save the costs of constructing and installing large structure autoclaves ($100M saved at NASA) and making small production runs of 100 aircraft economically viable.

== See also ==
- Composite material
- Carbon fiber reinforced polymer
- Out of autoclave composite manufacturing
