= Fiber-reinforced composite =

Composite building material

A fiber-reinforced composite (FRC) is a composite building material that consists of three components:

1. the fibers as the discontinuous or dispersed phase,
2. the matrix as the continuous phase, and
3. the fine interphase region, also known as the interface.

This is a type of advanced composite group, which makes use of rice husk, rice hull, rice shell, and plastic as ingredients. This technology involves a method of refining, blending, and compounding natural fibers from cellulosic waste streams to form a high-strength fiber composite material in a polymer matrix. The designated waste or base raw materials used in this instance are those of waste thermoplastics and various categories of cellulosic waste including rice husk and saw dust.

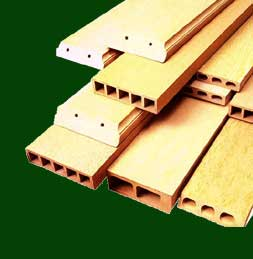
Fiber-reinforced composite

== Introduction ==
FRC is high-performance fiber composite made by cross-linking cellulosic fiber molecules with resins in the FRC material matrix through a proprietary molecular re-engineering process, yielding a product of exceptional structural properties.

Through this feat of molecular re-engineering selected physical and structural properties of wood are successfully cloned and vested in the FRC product, in addition to other critical attributes to yield performance properties superior to contemporary wood.

This material, unlike other composites, can be recycled up to 20 times, allowing scrap FRC to be reused again and again.

The failure mechanisms in FRC materials include delamination, intralaminar matrix cracking, longitudinal matrix splitting, fiber/matrix debonding, fiber pull-out, and fiber fracture.

Difference between wood plastic composite and fiber-reinforced composite:

Features	Plastic lumber	Wood plastic composite	FRC	Wood
Recyclable	Yes	No	Yes	Yes
House Construction	No	No	Yes	Yes
Water Absorption	0.00%	0.8% and above	0.3% and below	10% and above

== Properties ==
Tensile Strength	ASTM D 638	15.9 MPa
Flexural Strength	ASTM D 790	280 MPa
Flexural Modulus	ASTM D 790	1582 MPa
Failure Load	ASTM D 1761	1.5 KN - 20.8 KN
Compressive Strength		20.7MPa
Heat Reversion	BS EN 743 : 1995	0.45%
Water Absorption	ASTM D 570	0.35%
Termite Resistant	FRIM Test Method	3.6

== Basic principles ==
The appropriate "average" of the individual phase properties to be used in describing composite tensile behavior can be elucidated with reference to Fig. 6.2. Although

this figure illustrates a plate-like composite, the results that follow are equally applicable to fiber composites having similar phase arrangements. The two phase

material of Fig. 6.2 consists of lamellae of $\alpha$ and $\beta$ phases of thickness $l_\alpha$ and $l_\beta$. and respectively. Thus, the volume fractions ($V_\alpha$, $V_\beta$) of the phases are $V_\alpha=\frac{l_\alpha}{l_\alpha+l_\beta}$ and $V_\beta=\frac{l_\beta}{l_\alpha+l_\beta}$.

Case I: Same stress, different strain

A tensile force F is applied normal to the broad faces (dimensions Lx L) of the phases. In this arrangement the stress borne by each of the phases (= F/$L^2$) is the same, but the strains ($\varepsilon_\alpha$, $\varepsilon_\beta$) they experience are different. composite strain is a volumetric weighted average of the strains of the individual phases.

$\vartriangle l_\alpha=\varepsilon_\alpha l_\alpha$, $\vartriangle l_\beta=\varepsilon_\beta l_\beta$

The total elongation of the composite, $\vartriangle l_c$ is obtained as $\vartriangle l_c=N \vartriangle l_\alpha+ N \vartriangle l_\beta$

and the composite strain $\varepsilon_c$ is, $\varepsilon_c$=$\frac{\vartriangle l_c}{N(l_\alpha +l_\beta)}$=$V_\alpha\varepsilon_\alpha+V_\beta\varepsilon_\beta$= $\sigma\biggl(\frac{V_\alpha}{E_\alpha}+\frac{V_\beta}{E_\beta}\biggr)$

Composite modulus $E_c=\frac{E_\alpha E_\beta}{V_\alpha E_\beta+V_\beta E_\alpha}$

Case II: different stress, same strain

Fibers that are aligned parallel to the tensile axis, the strains in both phases are equal (and the same as the composite strain), but the external force is partitioned

unequally between the phases. $F=F_\alpha+F_\beta=NL(\sigma_\alpha l_\alpha+\sigma_\beta l_\beta)$

$\sigma_c=\left ( \frac{\sigma_\alpha l_\alpha}{l_\alpha+l_\beta}+\frac{\sigma_\beta l_\beta}{l_\alpha+l_\beta} \right )=\sigma_\alpha V_\alpha+\sigma_\beta V_\beta$

$E_c=V_\alpha E_\alpha+V_\beta E_\beta$

== Deformation behavior ==
When the fiber is aligned parallel to the direction of the matrix and applied the load as the same strain case. The fiber and matrix has the volume fraction $V_f$, $V_m$; stress $\sigma_f$ , $\sigma_m$; strain$\varepsilon_f$,$\varepsilon_m$; and modulus $E_f$, $E_m$. And here $\varepsilon_f$=$\varepsilon_f$=$\varepsilon_c$. The uniaxial stress-strain response of a fiber composite can be divided into several stages.

In stage 1, when the fiber and matrix both deform elastically, the stress and strain relation is $\sigma_c=V_f E_f \varepsilon_f+V_m E_m \varepsilon_m=\varepsilon_c (V_f E_f+V_m E_m)$

$E_c=V_f E_f+V_m E_m$

In stage 2, when the stress for the fiber is bigger than the yield stress, the matrix starts to deform plastically, and the fiber are still elastic, the stress and strain relation is

$\sigma_c=V_f E_f \varepsilon_f+V_m \sigma_m(\varepsilon_m)=V_f E_f \varepsilon_c+V_m \sigma_m(\varepsilon_c)$

$E_c=V_f E_f+V_m \left(\frac{d\sigma_m}{d\varepsilon_c}\right)$

In stage 3, when the matrix the fiber both deform plastically, the stress and strain relation is

$\sigma_c=V_f \sigma_f(\varepsilon_f)+V_m \sigma_m(\varepsilon_m)=V_f \sigma_f(\varepsilon_c)+V_m \sigma_m(\varepsilon_c)$

$E_c=V_f \left(\frac{d\sigma_f}{d\varepsilon_c}\right)+V_m \left(\frac{d\sigma_m}{d\varepsilon_c}\right)$

Since some fibers do not deform permanently prior to fracture, stage 3 cannot be observed in some composite.

In stage 4, when the fiber has already become fracture and matrix still deforms plastically, the stress and strain relation is

$\sigma_c=V_m \sigma_m(\varepsilon_m)$

However, it is not completely true, since the failure fibers can still carry some load.

== Reinforcement with discontinuous fibers ==
For discontinuous fibers (also known as whiskers, depending on the length), tensile force is transmitted from the matrix to the fiber by means of shear stresses that develop along the fiber-matrix interface.

Matrix has displacement equals zero at fiber midpoint and maximum at ends relative to the fiber along the interface. Displacement causes interfacial shear stress $\tau_m$ that is balanced with fiber tensile stress $\sigma_f$. $d_f$ is the fiber diameter, and $x$ is the distance from the fiber end.

$\tau_m (\pi d_f)dx = \left(\frac{\pi d_f^2}{4}\right)d \sigma_f$

$\frac{d\sigma_f}{dx}=\frac{4\tau_m}{d_f}$

After only a very small strain, the magnitude of the shear stress at the fiber end becomes large. This leads to two situation: fiber-matrix delamination or matrix having plastic shear.

If matrix has plastic shear: interfacial shear stress $\tau_m \le \tau_{my}$. Then there is a critical length $l_c$ that when $l>l_c$, after certain $x$, $\sigma_f$ remains constant and equals to stress in equal-strain condition.

$\sigma_f(\varepsilon_c)=2 \frac{\tau_{my}l_c}{d_f}$

$\frac{l_c}{d_f}=\frac{\sigma_f(\varepsilon_c)}{2\tau_{my}}$

The ratio, $\frac{l_c}{d_f}$ is called the "critical aspect ratio". It increases with composite strain $\varepsilon_c$. For the mid-point of a fiber to be stressed to the equal-strain condition at composite fracture, its length must be at least $d_f \sigma_f^{tensile}/2\tau_{my}$.

Then calculate average stress. The fraction of the fiber length carrying stress $\sigma_f(\varepsilon_c)$ is $\frac{l-l_c}{l}$. The remaining fraction $\frac{l_c}{l}$ bears an average stress $\sigma_f(\varepsilon_c)/2$.

$\overline{\sigma}_f=\sigma_f(\varepsilon_c)\left[1-\left(\frac{l_c}{l}\right)\right]+\frac{1}{2}\sigma_f(\varepsilon_c)\left(\frac{l_c}{l}\right)=\sigma_f(\varepsilon_c)\left[1-\left(\frac{l_c}{2l}\right)\right] \quad l\ge l_c$

For $l<l_c$, average stress is $\sigma_max/2$ with $\sigma_max=2\tau_{my}l/d_f$.

$\overline{\sigma}_f=\frac{1}{2}\sigma_f(\varepsilon_c)\left(\frac{l}{l_c}\right) \quad l\le l_c$

The composite stress is modified as following:

$\sigma_c=V_f \sigma_f(\varepsilon_c)\left[1-\left(\frac{l_c}{2l}\right)\right]+ V_m \sigma_m(\varepsilon_m) \quad l\ge l_c$

$\sigma_c=V_f \sigma_f(\varepsilon_c)\left(\frac{l}{2l_c}\right)+ V_m \sigma_m(\varepsilon_m) \quad l\le l_c$

The above equations assumed the fibers were aligned with the direction of loading. A modified rule of mixtures can be used to predict composite strength, including an orientation efficiency factor, $\eta_0$, which accounts for the decrease in strength from misaligned fibers.

$\sigma_c(\varepsilon) = V_m\sigma_m(\varepsilon) + \eta_0\eta_fV_f\sigma_f(\varepsilon)$

where $\eta_f$ is the fiber efficiency factor equal to $\frac{l}{2l_c}$for $l \leq l_c$, and $\left[1 - \left(\frac{l_c}{2l}\right)\right]$for $l > l_c$. If the fibers are perfectly aligned with the direction of loading $\eta_0$ is 1. However, common values of $\eta_0$ for randomly oriented are roughly 0.375 for an in-plane two-dimensional array and 0.2 for a three-dimensional array.

Appreciable reinforcement can be provided by discontinuous fibers provided their lengths are much greater than the (usually) small critical lengths. Such as MMCs.

If there is fiber-matrix delamination. $\tau_{my}$ is replaced by friction stress $\mu P$ where $\mu$ is the friction coefficient between the matrix and the fiber, and $P$ is an internal pressure.

$\frac{l_c}{d_f}=\frac{\sigma_f(\varepsilon_c)}{2\mu P}$

This happens in most resin-based composites.

Composites with fibers length less than $l_c$ contribute little to strength. However, during composite fracture, the short fibers do not fracture. Instead they are pulled out of the matrix. The work associated with fiber pull-out provides an added component to the fracture work and has a great contribution to toughness.

== Application ==
There are also applications in the market, which utilize only waste materials. Its most widespread use is in outdoor deck floors, but it is also used for railings, fences, landscaping timbers, cladding and siding, park benches, molding and trim, window and door frames, and indoor furniture. See for example the work of Waste for Life, which collaborates with garbage scavenging cooperatives to create fiber-reinforced building materials and domestic problems from the waste their members collect: Homepage of Waste for Life

Adoption of natural fiber in reinforced polymer composites potentially to be used in automotive industry could significantly help developing a sustainable waste management.

== See also ==
- Fiber volume ratio
- Fracture mechanics
- Plastic composite (disambiguation)
- Plastic lumber
- Wood plastic composite
- Fibre-reinforced plastic
- Recycled composite components
- Lignocellulosic filler reinforced polymer
