= Discontinuous filament winding machine =

A discontinuous filament winding machine (DFW machine or DW machine) is a machine for laying fiberglass filament windings over a cylindrical mould or mandrel bar using a carriage that is traveling along the axis of that mandrel. The mandrel is fixed on a mandrel stand and is rotated by an asynchronous motor. The carriage is the set-up that holds and winds the fiberglass on the rotating mandrel. The difference between the continuous and discontinuous filament winding machine is the area on which filament winding is laying out.

DW machines are normally used for manufacturing epoxy pipes.
