= Biocomposite =

Composite material reinforced by natural fibers

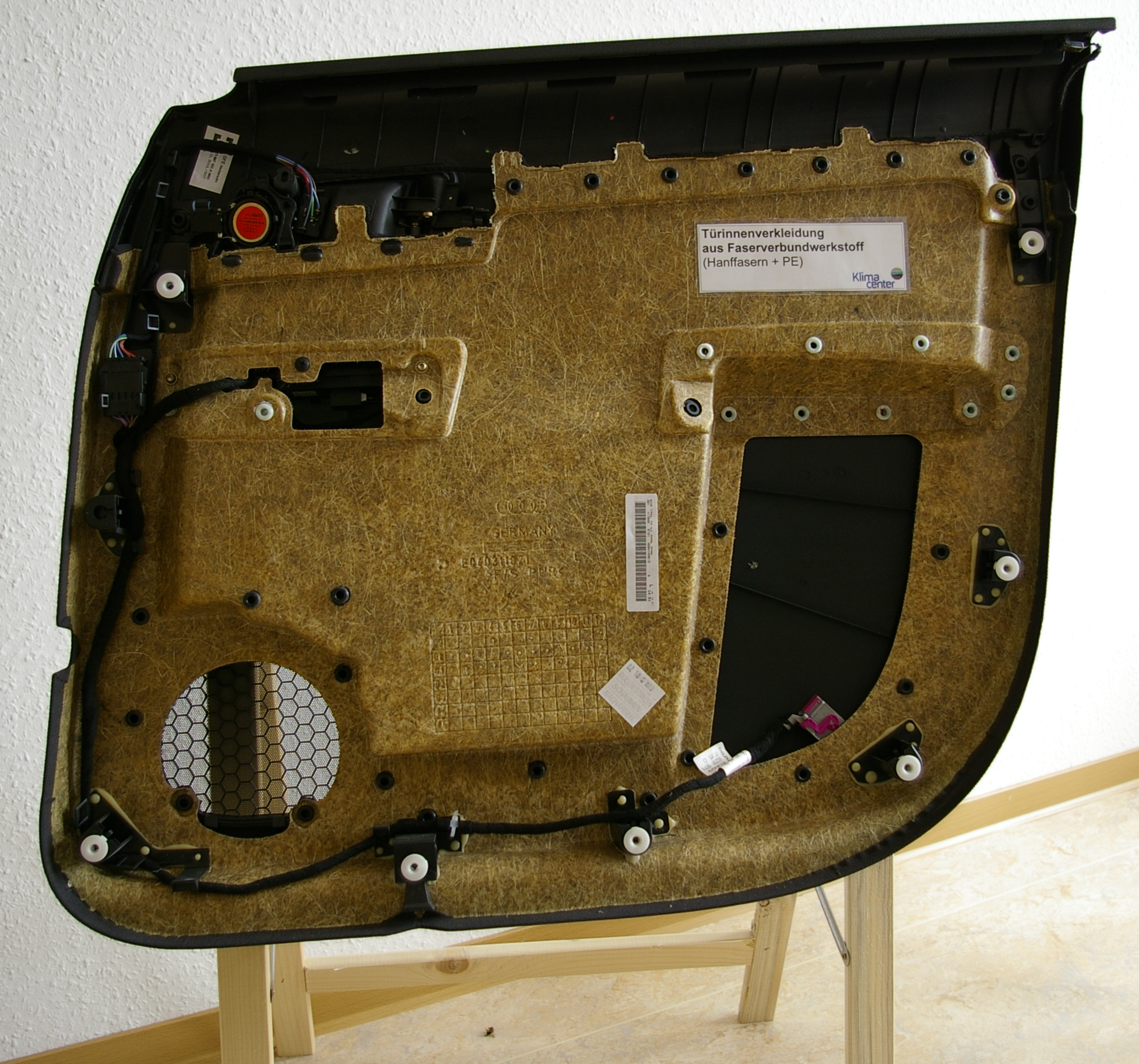
Interior padding of a car's door, made of a hemp-polyethylene biocomposite

A biocomposite is a composite material formed by a resin matrix reinforced by natural fiber. Environmental concerns and the cost of synthetic fiber have led to its substitution with natural fibre, sourced from crops (cotton, flax or hemp), recycled wood, waste paper, crop processing byproducts, or regenerated cellulose fiber (rayon).

Interest in biocomposites is rapidly growing in terms of industrial applications and fundamental research due to its ecological and cost benefits. Biocomposites can be used alone or as a complement to standard composites, such as carbon fiber. Advocates of biocomposites state that these materials improve are environmentally superior, lighter in weight, safer to produce, and have a visual appeal similar to that of wood.

== Characteristics ==
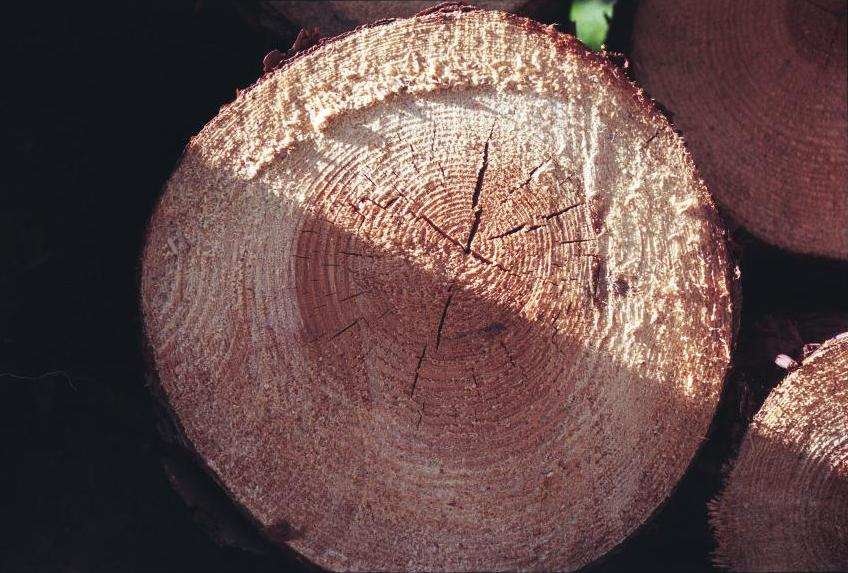
Wood fibers may be used to produce biocomposites.

As opposed to conventional composites, biocomposites utilize natural materials, which reduces their environmental impact. These materials are renewable, inexpensive, and in certain cases completely recyclable or biodegradable. Natural fibers have a hollow structure, which translates to better thermal and sound insulation. Another advantage of natural fibers is their low density, which results in a higher specific tensile strength and stiffness than glass fibers. As such, biocomposites could be a viable ecological alternative to carbon fiber, fiberglass, and other such synthetic fiber composites in applications such as packaging, construction, automobiles, aerospace, military applications, electronics, consumer products and medical industry (prosthetic, bone plate, orthodontic archwire, total hip replacement, and composite screws and pins). However, biocomposites have limitations due to a lack of compatibility between synthetic resin and natural fibers.

== Classification ==
Biocomposites are divided into wood and non-wood fiber composites, all of which contain cellulose and lignin. Wood fibers are classified as such if they contain a significant amount (almost 60%) of wood, and are further divided into softwood fibers (long and flexible) and hardwood fibers (shorter and stiffer), as well as recycled or non-recycled. Non-wood fibers are divided into straw, bast, leaf, seed or fruit, and grass fibers. The fibers most widely used in the industry are flax, jute, hemp, kenaf, sisal, and coir. Straw can be found in many parts of the world, and it is an example of a low-cost reinforcement for biocomposites. Matrices include polyethylene, polypropylene, and polyvinyl chloride.

Non-wood natural fibers are more attractive for the industry due to their physical and mechanical properties; these include their relative length, high cellulose content (which increases tensile strength), and higher cellulose crystallinity. The comparative disadvantages of wood fibers include the presence of hydroxy groups that can attract water molecules, causing the fibers to swell. This in turn results in voids between the fibers and matrix, which has negative effects on the composite's mechanical properties and dimensional stability.

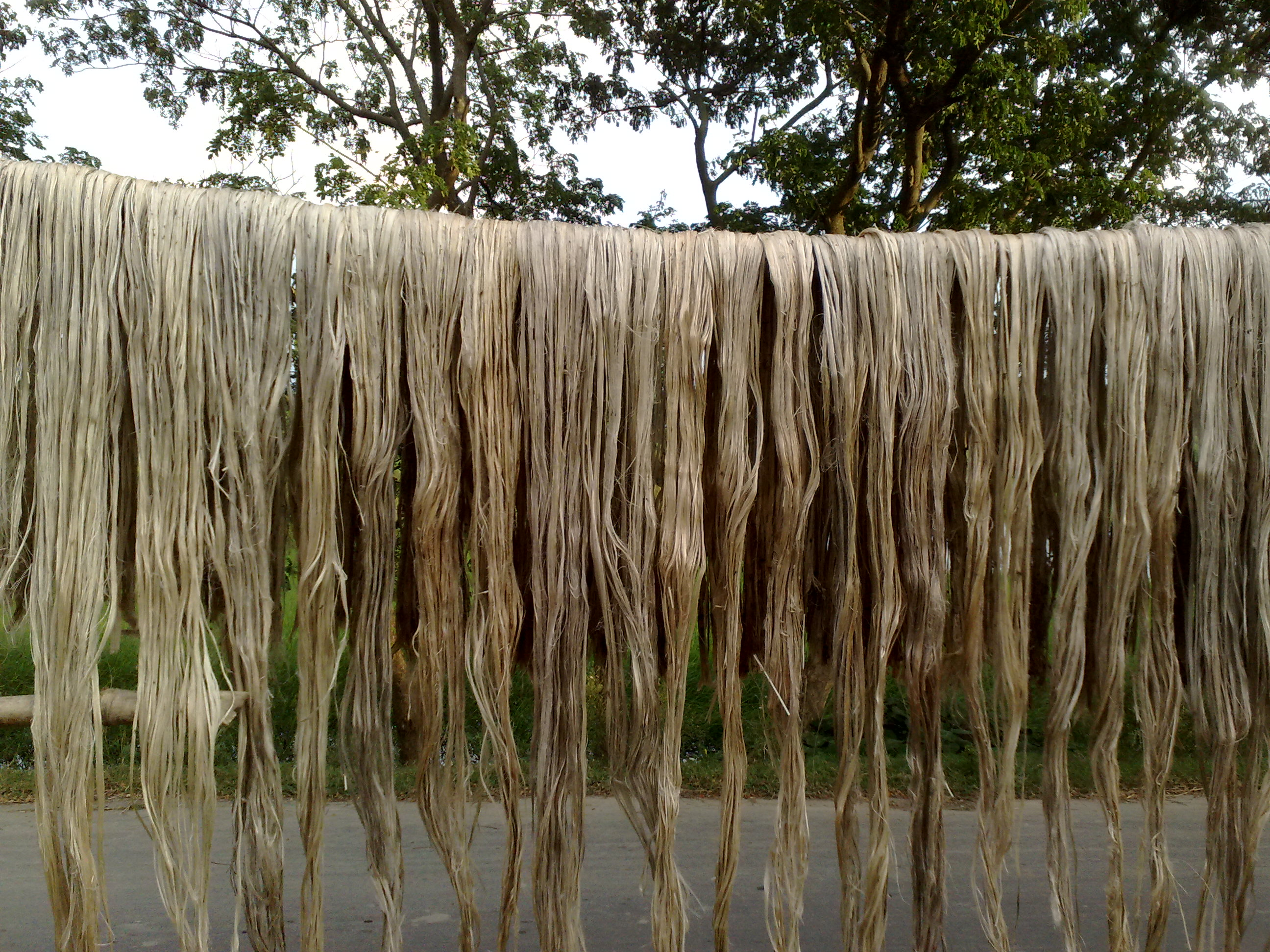
Jute fibers are one of the most widely used in the industry.

=== Green composites ===
Green composites are classified as biocomposites combining natural fibers with biodegradable matrices. They can be easily disposed of without harming the environment. Because of their durability, green composites are mainly used to increase the life cycle of products with short lives.

=== Hybrid composites ===
A hybrid biocomposite uses different types of fibers, synthetic or natural, with a single matrix. Its functionality depends directly on the balance between the positive and negative traits of each individual material used, though the different types of fibers can account for each other's shortcomings. The properties of this biocomposite depend directly on those of the fibers, such as their content, length, arrangement, and bonding to the matrix. In particular, the strength of the hybrid composite depends on the failure strain of the individual fibers.

Classification of biocomposites
	Biocomposites/biofibers						
Type	Non-wood natural fibers					Wood fibers	
Subtype	Straw	Bast	Leaf	Seed/fruit	Grass	Non-recycled	Recycled
Examples	Rice, wheat, corn straws	Kenaf, flax, jute, hemp	Henequen, sisal, penneaple leaf fiber	Cotton, coir, coconut	Bamboo, bamboo fiber, switch grass, elephant grass	Soft, hard	Newspaper, magazine

== Processing ==
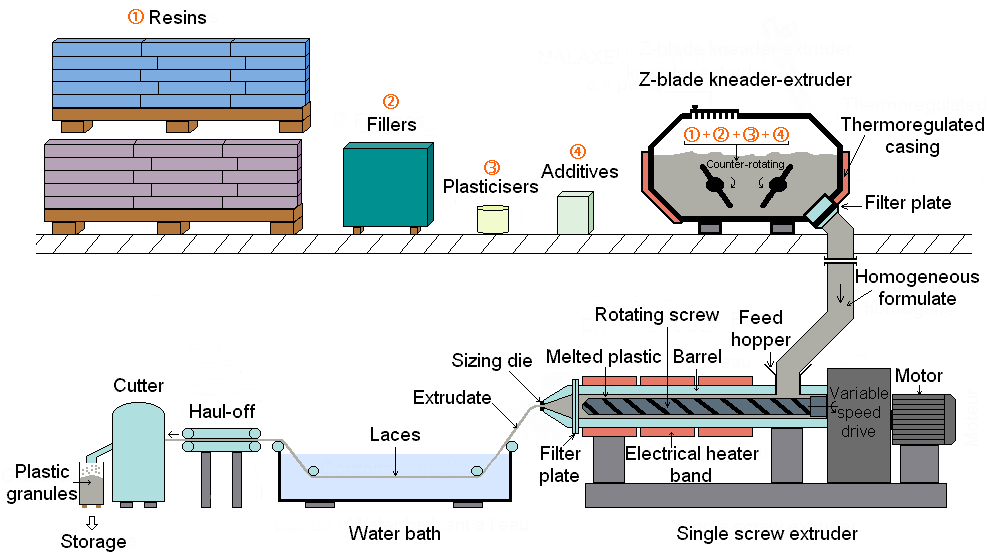
Biocomposite materials, based on thermoplastic matrices, being processed by compounding and extrusion

The production of biocomposites uses techniques already used to manufacture plastics or conventional composites, including:

- Machine presses
- Filament winding
- Pultrusion
- Extrusion (most widely used, principally for green biocomposites)
- Injection molding
- Compression molding
- Resin transfer molding
- Sheet moulding compounds

== Applications ==
=== Flax ===
For automotive interiors, Composites Evolution performed prototype testing for the Land Rover Defender and the Jaguar XF, with the Defender's flax linen composite 60% lighter than its production counterpart but just as rigid, and the XF's flax composite part 35% lighter.

In sports equipment, Ergon Bikes produced a concept saddle that won first place among 439 entries in the Accessories category at the Eurobike 2012 trade show. VE Paddles has produced a flax boat paddle blade, and Flaxland Canoes has developed a canoe with a flax linen hull. Magine Snowboards has developed a snowboard that incorporates flax linen in its construction, and Samsara Surfboards has produced a flax linen surfboard. Idris Ski's Lynx skis won an ISPO Award in 2013 for their use of flax.

Flax linen composites also work for applications for which the look, feel, or sound of wood is desired, but without susceptibility to warping, including furniture and musical instruments. A team at Sheffield Hallam University designed a cabinet with entirely sustainable materials, including flax linen. Blackbird Guitars has produced a ukulele made with flax linen that has won a number of design awards in the composites industry, as well as a guitar.

=== Hemp ===
For consumer goods, Trifilon has developed a number of hemp fiber biocomposites to replace conventional plastics. Suitcases, chillboxes, phone cases and cosmetic packaging have been produced using hemp fibers.

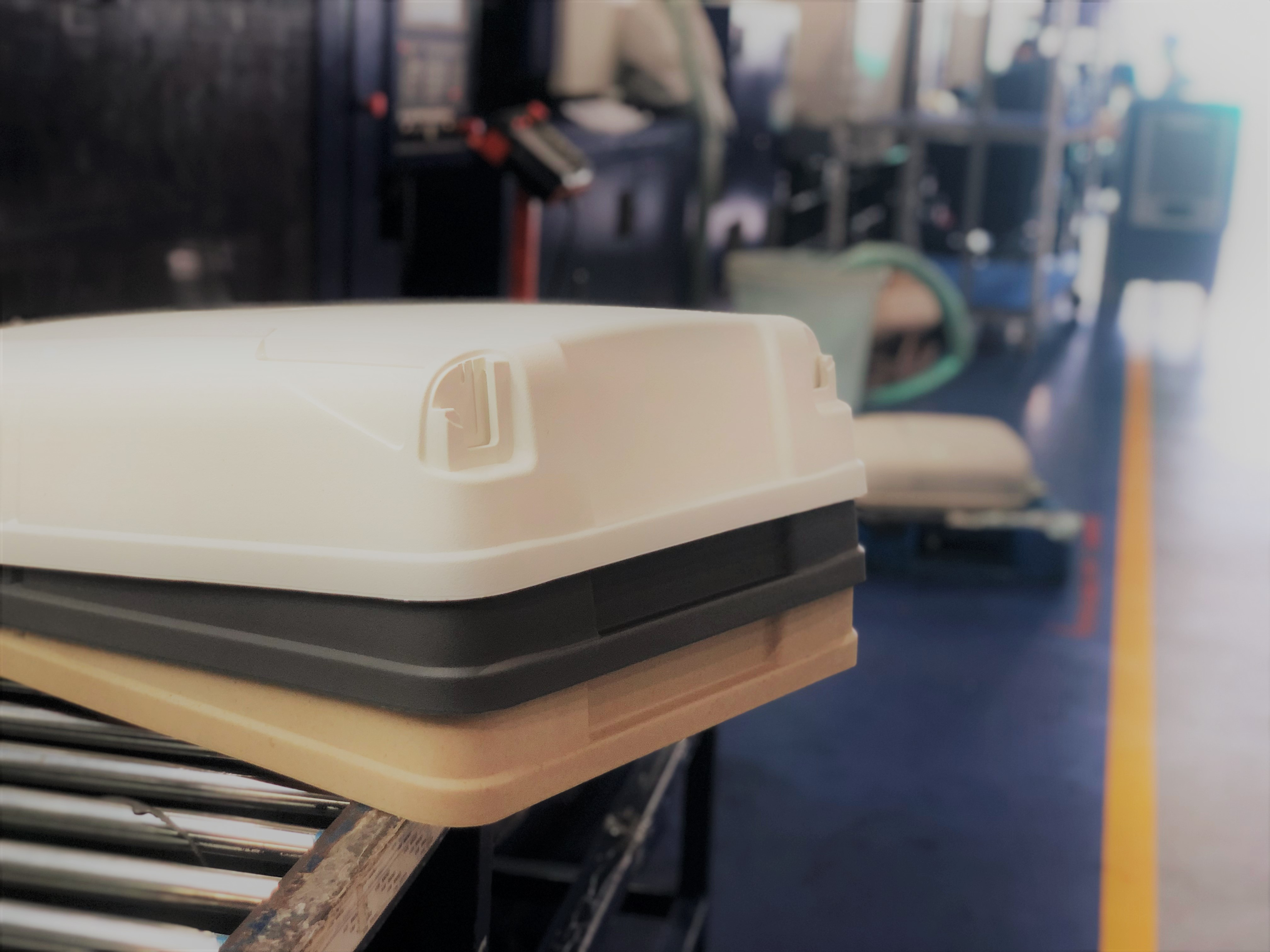
Hemp fiber composite suitcase

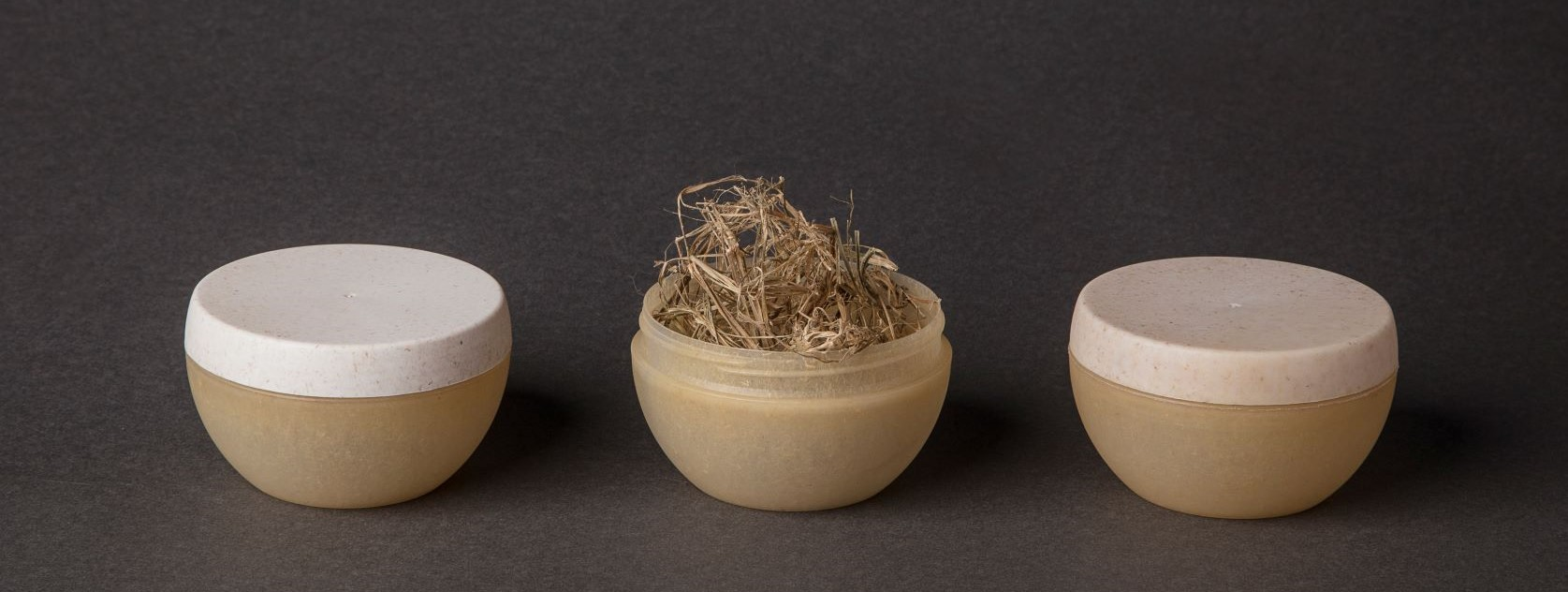
Hemp fiber composite - cosmetic packaging

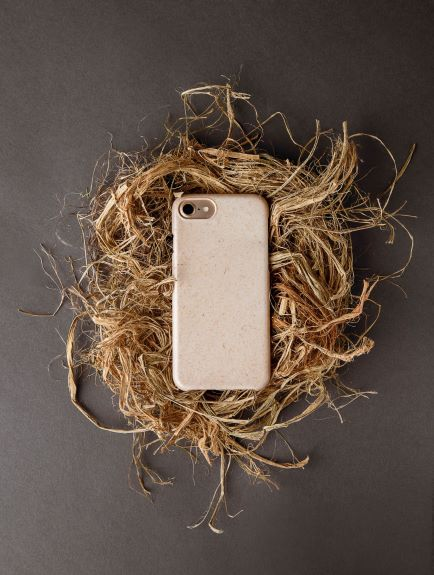
Hemp fiber composite - mobile phone case

== See also ==
- Pykrete, a composite of wood pulp and ice

== Bibliography ==
- Pingle, P. Analytical Modeling of Hard Biocomposites. ProQuest, 2008. University of Massachusetts Lowell. Website: https://books.google.com/books?id=XRLEstOKTiEC&q=biocomposites
- Mohanty, A.K.; Misra, M.; Drzal, L.T. Natural Fibers, Biopolymers, and Biocomposites. CRC Press, 2005. Website: https://books.google.com/books?id=AwXugfY2oc4C&q=biocomposites
- Averous, L.; Le Digabel, F. Properties of biocomposites based on lignocellulosic fillers. Science Direct, 2006. Website: http://www.biodeg.net/fichiers/Properties%20of%20biocomposites%20based%20on%20lignocellulosic%20fillers%20(Proof).pdf
- Averous, L. Cellulose-based biocomposites: comparison of different multiphasic systems. Composite Interfaces, 2007. Website: http://www.biodeg.net/fichiers/Cellulosebased%20biocomposites%20(Abstract-Proof).pdf
- Halonen, H. Structural changes during cellulose composite processing. Stockholm, 2012. Website: http://www.diva-portal.org/smash/get/diva2:565072/FULLTEXT01.pdf
- Fowler, P; Hughes, J; Elias, E. Biocomposites: technology, environmental credentials and market forces. Journal of the Science Food and Agriculture, 2006. Website: http://www.bc.bangor.ac.uk/_includes/docs/pdf/biocomposites%20technology.pdf
- Todkar, Santosh Sadashiv; Patil, Suresh Abasaheb (October 2019). "Review on mechanical properties evaluation of pineapple leaf fibre (PALF) reinforced polymer composites". Composites Part B: Engineering. 174 106927. doi:10.1016/j.compositesb.2019.106927. hdl:20.500.12010/19705. S2CID 189974174.
