= Flowtite Technology =

Norwegian technology company

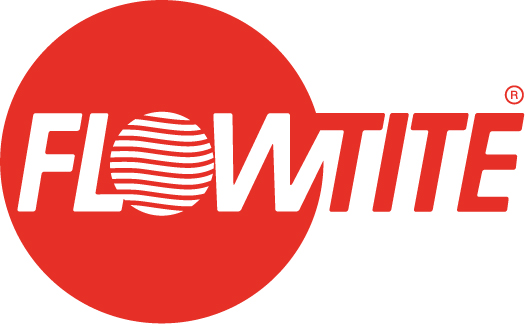
- Type: limited company (Aksjeselskap)
- Industry: Composites, GRP pipes
- Predecessors: Vera Fabrikker, Veroc Technology
- Founded: 1977 in Sandefjord, Norway
- Founders: Owens Corning, Jotun
- Headquarters: Klagenfurt, Austria
- Products: GRP pipes, couplings, fittings etc
- Owner: Amiblu Holding GmbH 100%
- Website: https://www.amiblu.com/filament-winding-flowtite-technology/

Flowtite Technology, which is now known as Amiblu Technology AS, is a Norwegian technology company that is owned by Amiblu Holding GmbH. (Originally, the name "Flowtite" referred to both the company itself and the manufacturing process it pioneered. However, after the company was acquired by Amiblu, the company name was changed to Amiblu Technology, while the manufacturing process continues to be known as "Flowtite") The company develops GRP pipe manufacturing technology and designs tailor-made manufacturing equipment under the brand name Flowtite. Its predecessor, Vera Fabrikker, was the first company in the world to utilize a continuous filament winding machine for production of glassfibre-reinforced plastic pipes (GRP pipes) and to invent the corresponding manufacturing process, commonly known as continuous filament winding process or Drostholm process.

== History ==
The history of Flowtite Technology can be traced back to 1929 when the owners of Jotun established a manufacturing plant for vegetable oils, called Vera Fabrikker, in Sandefjord, Norway. In May 1966 engineers from Vera Fabrikker met with Frede Hilmar Drostholm at an exhibition in Copenhagen, Denmark. The company Drostholm Ltd presented a prototype of a continuous winding machine for production of GRP pipes — an invention of Drostholm’s partner, Peder Ulrik Poulsen. Vera Fabrikker purchased this machine with a goal to develop a process enabling the machine to produce GRP pipes and tank shells. After a year of unsuccessful experimenting, a second invention was made — a steel band was added to the machine and in 1968 Vera Fabrikker started producing GRP pipes and tanks. In 1971 the GRP technology was bought by Owens Corning, USA. Two years later, in 1977, Owens Corning together with Jotun established a new company — Veroc Technology AS (the last two letters in Veroc stand for Owens Corning). It was responsible for the development of GRP pipes and tanks, as well as manufacturing and installing production equipment for the licensed GRP pipe producers all over the world. In 1993 Owens Corning took over Veroc Technology 100%. Later, in 1998, the company name was changed to Flowtite Technology AS, as it is known today. In 2001 Flowtite Technology AS was acquired by the Saudi Arabian Amiantit Company (Amiantit Group) and became its main technology centre in 2006.

== Brand History ==
The brand Flowtite and its logo was created in the 1970s by Owens Corning, when the company produced GRP pipes under the trademark Flowtite. The trademark was first registered in the USA in 1975, then progressively across the world. It is composed of the words “flow” and “tite” (a dialect version of “tight”) and represents a steady movement of liquids through a compact and sealed medium. Two circles of the Flowtite logotype symbolize a pipe containing water flow.

== Flowtite Manufacturing Process ==
Flowtite pipes can only be produced with a custom-designed production equipment, which has a basic filament winding machine as a basis. It consists of a continuous steel band mandrel, supported by beams installed circumferentially to form a cylindrical shape. The mandrel moves continuously in a spiral path towards the exit assembly. As the mandrel rotates, all composite materials are metered onto it in precise amounts, forming one layer after another. As a pipe is being formed on the mandrel, it moves forward to the curing and cutting areas and the finished product comes out at the end of one continuous production process.

== Applications ==
Flowtite GRP pipes are used in various industries and multiple applications, such as:

- Water transmission and distribution (potable and raw water)
- Water storage and overflow systems
- Sewerage
- Hydropower
- Irrigation
- Industrial application
- Chemical sewage treatment
- Desalination
- Pulp & Paper
- Mining
- Marine, shipbuilding and offshore rigs
- Power plants, etc.
