= Hammesfahr =

Hammesfahr is a German surname. Notable people with the surname include:

- Hermann Hammesfahr (1845–1914), Prussian-American inventor
- Petra Hammesfahr (born 1951), German writer
