= Ekoa =

Biocomposite material

Ekoa is a natural biocomposite of flax available in dry fabrics and pre-pregs, as well as cores and resins. Ekoa can be used for a variety of applications, including the production of musical instruments like the ukulele and guitar, and the manufacturing of sports equipment such as bicycle frames and lacrosse sticks.

== History ==
Ekoa was initially developed by Blackbird Guitars, a company that has made musical instruments out of Carbon fiber reinforced polymer, but started working on a biobased composite material that would work well for musical instruments. Blackbird worked with Entropy Resins to develop Ekoa, and released the first production musical instrument in 2013. Joe Luttwak of Blackbird and Desi Banatao of Entropy formed a separate company, Lingrove, LLC, to further develop Ekoa and expand applications. Luttwak filed for a patent for "METHOD FOR MAKING LIGHT AND STIFF PANELS AND STRUCTURES USING NATURAL FIBER COMPOSITES" on November 18, 2014, which was given A1 Kind Code status on May 15, 2015. Lingrove filed "Ekoa" as a registered trademark on November 12, 2013. The trademark was registered on February 3, 2015. The trademark is registered under two separate classes: 015 - Musical instruments, and 024 - Textiles and textile goods, not included in other classes; bed and table covers.

== Applications ==
Ekoa was initially developed to combine the tone of wooden instruments with the durability of a composite instrument. Previously, composite instruments had been made with carbon fiber, glass fiber, or aluminum to achieve durability, but these materials did not have the same tonality of wood. To address this, Ekoa utilizes flax fibers and produces a tone more like wood. The first musical instrument product made of Ekoa was the Blackbird Clara concert ukulele, which has won a variety of awards in the composites industry, including at The Composites And Advanced Material Expo (CAMX), JEC Americas, and Industrial Designers Society of America's IDEA Award. Blackbird later introduced the El Capitan guitar model, also made with Ekoa.

For sports equipment, RockWest Composites has produced a bicycle frame in conjunction with Calfee, as well as a lacrosse stick with a hexagonal shape core wrapped in Ekoa twill.
