= Ignace Dubus-Bonnel =

French craftsman

Ignace Dubus-Bonnel (born 11 May 1794) was a French craftsman in Paris, who most notably was the first to get a patent for a method of creating and weaving glass threads, the predecessor of fiberglass, in 1836. He was born in Lille.
