= Continuous filament winding machine =

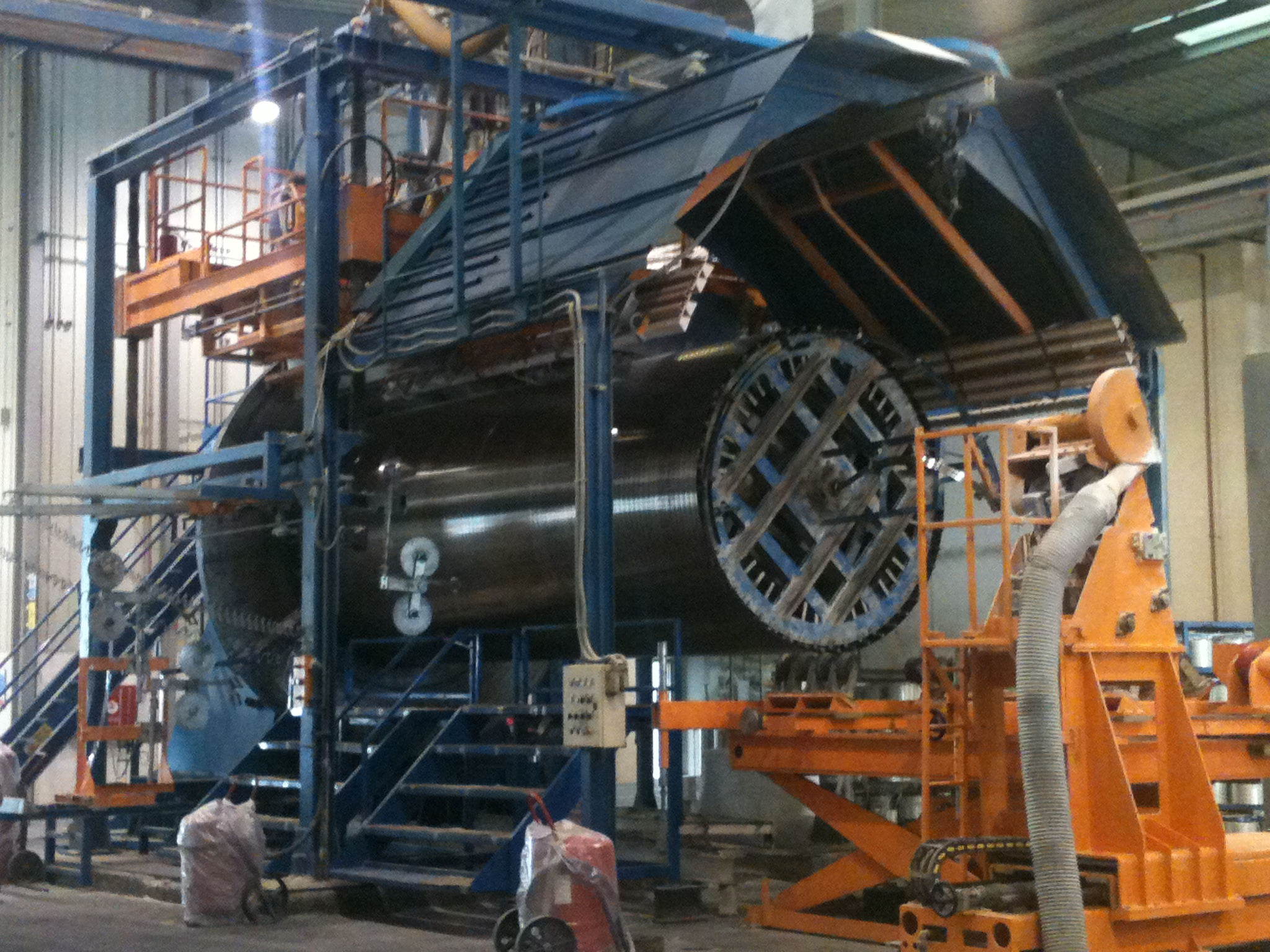
CFW Machine

A continuous filament winding machine (CFW Machine / CW Machine) is a machine for laying filament windings continuously over a cylindrical steel band. The steel band is carried on a forward moving mandrel which is able to collapse and return to the beginning of the travel. The steel band is released after the mandrel collapses and is continuously fed back to the start of the travel where it is again wound on to the mandrel.

This machine is mainly used to manufacture fibre-reinforced plastic (FRP) pipes and couplings, especially glass-reinforced plastic (GRP) pipes. They are used for the manufacture of large diameter pipes and there is a minimum diameter below which the technique becomes unrealistic. Machines are available for diameters from 0.25 to 4.0 m (9.8 to 157.5 in).

A raw material storage and mixing areas for resins, catalysts, etc. is needed to feed the machine. This will usually involve heating of the chemical mix. The raw material is fed on a continuous steel band. The steel band moves forward a distance equal to its width for each turn. The mandrel does not move forward and there is no collapsable mandrel in the process. The process of Continuous filament winding is also known as the Drostholm Process. In addition to the continuous advancing band, many alternative methods of filament winding also exist.

While the process is innovative in many ways, the work performed on the machines proved to carry HS&E risks caused by fumes, emissions, fire risks and mechanical pinch points.

== History ==
The first winding machine for production of GRP-pipes was invented in 1965 - 1967 by Danish and Norwegian engineers: Peder Ulrik Poulsen, Tage Debess and Agnar Gilbu in cooperation between two companies, the Norwegian Vera Fabrikker (later, Flowtite Technology AS) and the Danish Drostholm Ltd. The Danish engineers mainly focused on the invention of the winding machine, whereas the Norwegian ones were responsible for the development of the process enabling this machine to produce GRP pipes and tanks.

Peder Ulrik Poulsen invented the rotating mandrel with an endless steel band (strip) in 1967, which made the continuous filament winding process possible. The corresponding patent application was filed in August 1968, and the patent granted in 1969. At the time, Poulsen worked with Drostholm Ltd., the company that acquired all the rights to utilize his inventions. That is where the continuous winding process derives its “Drostholm Process” name from. The first winder was built in Copenhagen, Denmark in 1968 and shipped to Vera Fabrikker in Sandefjord, Norway for the production of GRP-pipes.
