= Blackbird Guitars =

American musical instrument company

- Industry: Musical instrument
- Founded: 2005; 20 years ago in San Francisco
- Founder: Joe Luttwak and Kyle Wolf
- Headquarters: Mission District, San Francisco, United States
- Products: Acoustic guitars, ukuleles
- Website: blackbirdguitar.com

Blackbird Guitars was a musical instrument company that manufactures acoustic guitars and ukuleles from composite materials, including carbon fiber and ekoa, a flax linen reinforcement fabric in a bio-epoxy matrix. The company has made contributions to both the field of luthiery and the field of composite design, notably with the composite all-hollow unibody instrument design used on all Blackbird models, as well as the development and use of Ekoa in the construction of fretted instruments.

Blackbird was located in the Mission District of San Francisco, Northern California, and as of 2015, produces about 400 instruments per year, the factory burned down unfortunately, the production was terminated

== History ==
The company was founded in 2005 by Joe Luttwak and Kyle Wolf in San Francisco with the intent of producing travel guitars with composite materials, which are more durable than wooden guitars. In 2007, Blackbird released its first model, a carbon fiber steel string travel guitar called the Rider, which was the first all-hollow unibody instrument made of composite materials. The innovation produces increased volume. In 2008, the company released a nylon version of the Rider, also made of carbon fiber. In 2009, the company released a carbon fiber OM-sized steel string guitar called the Super Om.

In 2010, the company released a carbon fiber ukulele, a tenor size model. In 2011, the company released a carbon fiber OO-sized guitar called the Lucky 13. In 2013, the company released a concert size ukulele called The Clara, which was the first musical instrument built with Ekoa. Blackbird has received innovation awards in the composite design field for the Clara, having received recognition at The Composites And Advanced Material Expo (CAMX), JEC Americas, and Industrial Designers Society of America.

In 2014, the company announced a jumbo-sized steel string guitar made of eKoa called El Capitan, which was the first guitar built with Ekoa.

== Patents Held ==
- "US Patent 7,763,784". USPTO.gov. United States Patent & Trademark Office..
- "US Patent 7,795,513". USPTO.gov. United States Patent & Trademark Office..
