= Hermann Hammesfahr =

American inventor (1845–1914)

Hermann Hammesfahr (February 20, 1845 – November 23, 1914) was a Prussian-American inventor who invented a type of fiberglass cloth in which glass was interwoven with silk. He was awarded the patent by the United States Patent Office in 1880. This was the earliest fiberglass of any kind that is known to have been patented.

== Family origins ==
Hammesfahr was born in Evangelisch, Flachsberg, Wald Solingen, Rhineland, Prussia and died in Brooklyn, New York—the son of Carl Wilhelm Hammesfahr (1811–1878) and Caroline Wilhelmine Remschied (1806–1878). The Hammesfahr family is an old Solingen steel family tracing its roots back to the medieval armorer's guild.

== The "grandfather" of fiber optics ==
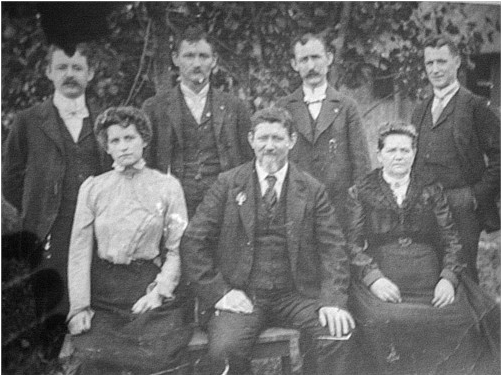
Hermann Hammesfahr appears center front, with family.

This patent and a number of associated patents also provided the practical foundation for the development and production of fiber optics (Hammesfahr has been called "the grandfather of fiber optics") and fiberglass. All were purchased by the Libbey Glass Company in Toledo, Ohio.

An immigrant from Prussia, he was known for his keen aesthetic achievements and technical innovations. Until recently, Hermann Hammesfahr and his contributions have been obscured, buried in scientific journals and first-hand historical accounts—and in many cases erroneously attributed to others, such as Edward Drummond Libbey, owner of Libbey Glass Company.

== 1893 Chicago World's Fair ==
Libbey Glass purchased the fiberglass patent among others from Hammesfahr with the intention of displaying the fabric in a spectacular manner at the 1893 World's Columbian Exposition in Chicago, Illinois. At first, the company wove lamp shades from the glass fabric. Then it caught the eye of actress Georgia Cayvan who requested a dress be made from it. Hammesfahr designed a dress and the Libby Glass company showed it off at the Columbian Exposition. The dress was a sensation. Thomas Edison's electric light bulb also debuted at the fair, as well as the Ferris wheel; however contemporary accounts indicate it was the glass dress that attracted the attention of women across America.https://www.newspapers.com/clip/87764690/marriage-of-hammesfahr-kse/

== Flexible Glass Fabric ==
Many onlookers were impressed by the dress at the 1893 World's Fair and a copy was purchased for $30,000 by Princess Eulalia of Spain. However, the dress was reportedly impractical and no one else is known to have bought another dress. Hammesfahr's granddaughter modeled a glass dress her mother had made at the 1904 St. Louis World's Fair and reported that the dress scratched and was fragile. Despite this, the dresses, neckties, and other attire made from the glass fabric succeeded in publicizing the flexible glass thread technology. Hammesfahr's creation inspired new, innovative uses for glass fabric. It could withstand corrosive chemicals so chemists and druggist used it to filter solid particles out of liquid. Tangled glass fibers – glass wool – made a great insulator and was used by industry to surround steam pipes. Glass fabric was even used as bandages.

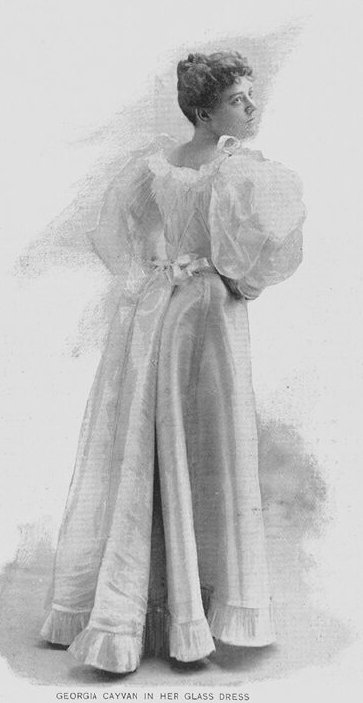
Georgia Cayvan in her glass dress, 1893.
