= Filament winding =

Fabrication technique using strength fibres in a binding matrix

Filament winding is a fabrication technique mainly used for manufacturing open (cylinders) or closed end structures (pressure vessels or tanks). This process involves winding filaments under tension over a rotating mandrel. The mandrel rotates around the spindle (Axis 1 or X: Spindle) while a delivery eye on a carriage (Axis 2 or Y: Horizontal) traverses horizontally in line with the axis of the rotating mandrel, laying down fibers in the desired pattern or angle to the rotational axis. The most common filaments are glass or carbon and are impregnated with resin by passing through a bath as they are wound onto the mandrel. Once the mandrel is completely covered to the desired thickness, the resin is cured. Depending on the resin system and its cure characteristics, often the mandrel is autoclaved or heated in an oven or rotated under radiant heaters until the part is cured. Once the resin has cured, the mandrel is removed or extracted, leaving the hollow final product. For some products such as gas bottles, the 'mandrel' is a permanent part of the finished product forming a liner to prevent gas leakage or as a barrier to protect the composite from the fluid to be stored.

Filament winding is well suited to automation, and there are many applications, such as pipe and small pressure vessel that are wound and cured without any human intervention. The controlled variables for winding are fibre type, resin content, wind angle, tow or bandwidth and thickness of the fiber bundle. The angle at which the fibre is wound has an effect on the properties of the final product. A high angle "hoop" will provide circumferential strength, while lower angle patterns (either polar or helical) will provide greater longitudinal / axial tensile strength.

Products currently being produced using this technique range from pipes, golf club shafts, reverse osmosis membrane housings, oars, bicycle forks, bicycle rims, power and transmission poles, pressure vessels, missile casings, aircraft fuselages, lamp posts and yacht spars.

== Filament winding machines ==
The simplest winding machines have two axes of motion, the mandrel rotation and the carriage travel (usually horizontal). Two-axis machines are best suited to the manufacture of pipes only. For pressure vessels such as LPG or CNG containers (for example) it is normal to have a four-axis winding machine. A four-axis machine additionally has a radial (cross-feed) axis perpendicular to carriage travel and a rotating fibre payout head mounted to the cross-feed axis. The payout head rotation can be used to stop the fibre band twisting and thus varying in width during winding.

Machines with more than four axes can be used for advanced applications, six-axis winding machines usually have 3 linear and 3 rotation axes. Machines with more than 2 axes of motion have computer/CNC control, however these days new 2-axis machines mostly have numeric control. Computer controlled filament winding machines require the use of software to generate the winding patterns and machine paths, such software can normally be provided by filament winding machine manufacturers or by using independent products.

Around 2005–2007, MF Tech (France) and TANIQ (Netherlands) started using 6 degrees-of-freedom industrial robots for filament winding, as an "affordable and robust alternative". Quickly, innovative winding concepts were developed wherein the robot is holding a rotating mandrel, and also executing extra automation steps for handling mandrels.

After filament winding, robot systems were further developed for the placement of thermoplastic tapes. This requires different path placement software and dedicated tape placement heads.

== Process ==
The process of Filament Winding;

- Uses a continuous length of fiber strand / roving (Called Direct Single end Roving), or tape
- Results in a shell of materials with a high strength-to-weight ratio due to the high percentage of glass in the composite matrix (70-80%)
- Patterns may be longitudinal, circumferential, helical or polar
- Mostly requires thermal curing of workpieces

Filament winding processes can be either Continuous or Discontinuous type.

=== Continuous winding Process ===
Continuous winding processes are used to manufacture low pressure, small to very large diameter pipes continuously on a mandrel formed out of an endless band (commonly known as the Drostholm Process). Pipes manufactured through this process are primarily used for media (water, sewage, waste-water) transmission / distribution networks. Continuous filament winding machines are usually 2 axis machines capable of laying fibre, fiberglass cloth, veil in a continuous hoop pattern. These machines are usually equipped with multiple chopper motors (to impart multi directional fibre placement on the part) and sand hoppers (to drop sand onto the part and impart a structurally strengthened core)

=== Discontinuous Winding Process ===
Discontinuous winding process is used to manufacture high pressure parts, pipes, pressure vessels and complex components. Multi axes machine are used to customize the angle of lay for the fiberglass band.

== Other Filament Winding Equipment ==
=== Fiberglass impregnation ===
Fiberglass direct rovings are immersed in a resin bath where they are coated with resin system. Each strand in the fiberglass roving is coated with sizing chemistry that provides secondary bonding between the fiberglass strand and the resin. Sizing can be singular resin system compatible (like polyester compatible or epoxy compatible) or multi-system compatible (polyester+epoxy+polyurethane compatible). Compatibility of the sizing is critical in ensuring a bond between the resin and fiber except in the case of polyurethane resin systems where the resin bonds directly to the glass as well as the sizing equally well. Conventional Resin impregnation systems are the "W Dip Bath" or the "Doctoring Roll" design, however recently there have been major advances in the impregnation bath to reduce waste, maximize resin impregnation effectiveness and improve composite matrix properties. This results in far superior impregnation and resin to glass ratio control as compared to the conventional baths.

The impregnated tows are then literally wound around a mandrel (mold core) in a controlled pattern to form the shape of the part. After winding, the resin is then cured, typically using heat. The mold core may be removed or may be left as an integral component of the part(Rosato, D.V.). This process is primarily used for hollow, generally circular or oval sectioned components, such as pipes and tanks. Pressure vessels, pipes and drive shafts have all been manufactured using filament winding. It has been combined with other fiber application methods such as hand layup, pultrusion, and braiding. Compaction is through fiber tension and resin content is primarily metered. The fibers may be impregnated with resin before winding (wet winding), pre-impregnated (dry winding) or post-impregnated. Wet winding has the advantages of using the lowest cost materials with long storage life and low viscosity. The pre-impregnated systems produce parts with more consistent resin content and can often be wound faster.

=== Fiberglass Tensioners ===
Fiber tension is a critical element in building composite structures. If tension on the strand is too low, the composite laminate structure will have lower mechanical strength and performance. If the tension is too high, the strands may experience fraying of the stands or fuzz buildups. Due to excessive tension, the resin to glass ratio in the laminate may also increase to beyond an acceptable limits resulting in laminates that are unsuitable in applications that transport media and liquids.

Fiberglass tensioners may impart dry or wet tension depending on its location, prior to or post impregnation of the fiberglass strands.

== Materials ==
Glass fibre is the fibre most frequently used for filament winding, carbon and aramid fibres are also used. Most high strength critical aerospace structures are produced with epoxy or polyurethane resins, with either epoxy, polyurethane or cheaper polyester resins being specified for most other applications. The ability to use continuous reinforcement without any breaks or joins is a definite advantage, as is the high fibre volume fraction that is obtainable, about 60% to 80%. Only the inner surface of a filament wound structure will be smooth unless a secondary operation is performed on the outer surface. The component is normally cured at high temperature before removing the mandrel. Finishing operations such as machining or grinding are not normally necessary (Furness, J., Azom.com).

- Resins: Any, e.g. epoxy, polyurethane, polyester, vinylester, phenolics, furans, polyimides.
- Fibers: Glass, aramid, carbon and boron fibers. The fibers are used straight from a creel and not woven or stitched into a fabric form.
- Cores: Any, although components are usually single skin.

== Hazards ==
=== Emissions ===
Employees in fibreglass manufacturing processes using polyester and vinyl ester resin systems are exposed to multiple hazards – high levels of styrene. As styrene emission controls and limits get tighter, the industry is shifting slowly towards resin systems like polyurethanes that do not have volatile solvents.

=== Bisphenol A ===
Bisphenol A (BPA) is a key component of epoxy resin systems. BPA is a suspected endocrine disruptor and is banned in many countries from being used in products like baby bottles. Because BPA is a reproductive, developmental, and systemic toxicant in animal studies and is weakly estrogenic, there are questions about its potential impact particularly on children's health and the environment. US-EPA intends to initiate alternatives analyses for BPA in BPA-based materials lining water and waste water pipes since this application may have a potential for human and environmental exposure. BPA from epoxy-based composite products like pipes can leach out into the fluid medium (water)when subjected to elevated temperature and is a cause of concern.

=== Toxic and Hazardous Curatives ===
- MEKP is a severe skin irritant and was suspected to cause progressive corrosive damage or blindness.
- MDA (4, 4'-Diaminodephenyl methane) is a suspected carcinogen
