= Pultrusion =

Process to manufacture fibre-reinforced plastics with constant cross-sections

Pultrusion is a continuous process for manufacture of fibre-reinforced plastics with constant cross-section. The term is a portmanteau word, combining "pull" and "extrusion". As opposed to extrusion, which pushes the material, pultrusion pulls the material.

A very early pultrusions type patent was filed by J.H. Watson in 1944. This was followed by M.J. Meek's filing of 1950. The first commercial pultrusions were provided by Glastic Company of Cleveland, Ohio under the patent filed in 1952 by Rodger B. White. The patent issued to W. B. Goldsworthy in 1959 helped initiate the promotion and knowledge spread within the industry. W. Brandt Goldsworthy is widely regarded as the inventor of pultrusion.

Parallel to the work of Goldsworthy, who concentrated his work on unsaturated polyester resins, Ernst Kühne in Germany developed a quite similar process in 1954 based on epoxy resin.

Invention, development and the issuance of patents continue in the pultrusion field through today. A later innovation in this field has been developed and patented by Thomas GmbH + Co. Technik + Innovation KG in Germany 2008 and is described below.

== Process ==
Diagram of the pultrusion process.: 1. Continuous roll of reinforced fibers/woven fiber mat; 2. Tension roller; 3. Resin impregnator; 4. Resin soaked fiber; 5. Die and heat source; 6. Pull mechanism; 7. Finished hardened fiber reinforced polymer

In the standard pultrusion process the reinforcement materials like fibers or woven or braided strands are impregnated with resin, possibly followed by a separate preforming system, and pulled through a heated stationary die where the resin undergoes polymerization. The impregnation is either done by pulling the reinforcement through a bath or by injecting the resin into an injection chamber which typically is connected to the die. Many resin types may be used in pultrusion including polyester, polyurethane, vinylester and epoxy. Resin provides the resistance to the environment, (i.e., the corrosion resistance, the UV resistance, the impact resistance, etc.) and the glass provides strength, in addition to safety from fire.

A surface veil can also be added to protect against erosion or “fiber bloom” and provide corrosion resistance and ultraviolet resistance.

The technology is not limited to thermosetting polymers. More recently, pultrusion has been successfully used with thermoplastic matrices such as polybutylene terephthalate (PBT), polyethylene terephthalate (PET) either by powder impregnation of the glass fiber or by surrounding it with sheet material of the thermoplastic matrix, which is then heated. Engineered Composites Ltd in the UK has led the improvements in the process over the last 38 years working with major production houses and universities.

Ecological cleanness of manufactured products, in contrast to composites on thermosetting resins base, as well as practically unlimited possibilities of recycling (processing) after the resource depletion appear to be forcible arguments in favor of reinforced thermoplastics. For these reasons the industrial output and use of the given materials in highly industrialized countries have increased by 8–10% per year in recent decades. New developments (see process modifications) which enable the manufacturing not only of straight but also curved profiles are actually pushing the demand for this technology, especially in the automotive sector.

Pultrusion technology of manufacturing of fiber composites with polymer matrix appears to be energy-efficient and resource-saving.

Economic and environmental factors favor use of a thermoplastic matrix but due to the high viscosity of melts it is difficult to achieve high productivity and high quality of fiberfills impregnation with this type of matrix.

Products manufactured under this technology are widely used in the following industries:

- In the agriculture and chemical industries for manufacturing of chemically resistant to aggressive media slatted floors with enhanced strength characteristics used in the construction of livestock facilities, chemical plants, etc.;
- in the construction industry for the production of glass-fiber reinforcement, profiles, carcasses, stiffening bars for PVC-windows, etc.;
- in the aerospace industry for manufacturing of structure components of aircraft;
- in the sports and tourism industries for manufacturing of equipment exhibiting enhanced strength properties: skis, ski poles, golf course flagsticks, tent and hovel constructions, etc.;
- in electrical power engineering for manufacturing of dielectric structures, fiberglass rods used in composite insulators and as supporting structures for elements of signaling blocks, and fiberglass profiles used in manufacturing of transformers and electric motors;
- in commercial production, using grains of long-fiber molding material (LLM) as a raw material for subsequent manufacturing of structures and products with enhanced strength and chemical properties;
- in the automotive industry for the production of structural and complex parts of the vehicles with enhanced stiffness, rigidity and lightness;
- and in many other industries and plants, using mechanisms, structures and materials, which meet high standards of chemical, dielectric and strength stability.

== Process modifications ==
As the materials are pulled through a die in the standard pultrusion process the process is only suited to manufacture straight profiles.

In a recently developed modification of the process, developed and patented by Thomas GmbH + Co. Technik + Innovation KG, the die is no longer stationary but moving back and forth along the profile to be manufactured. This modified process, known as "Radius-Pultrusion" allows also to manufacture two- and three-dimensional curved profiles. It also is beneficiary for a number of tasks in the linear process especially if quite complex textile reinforcements with a low rate of distortion are needed.

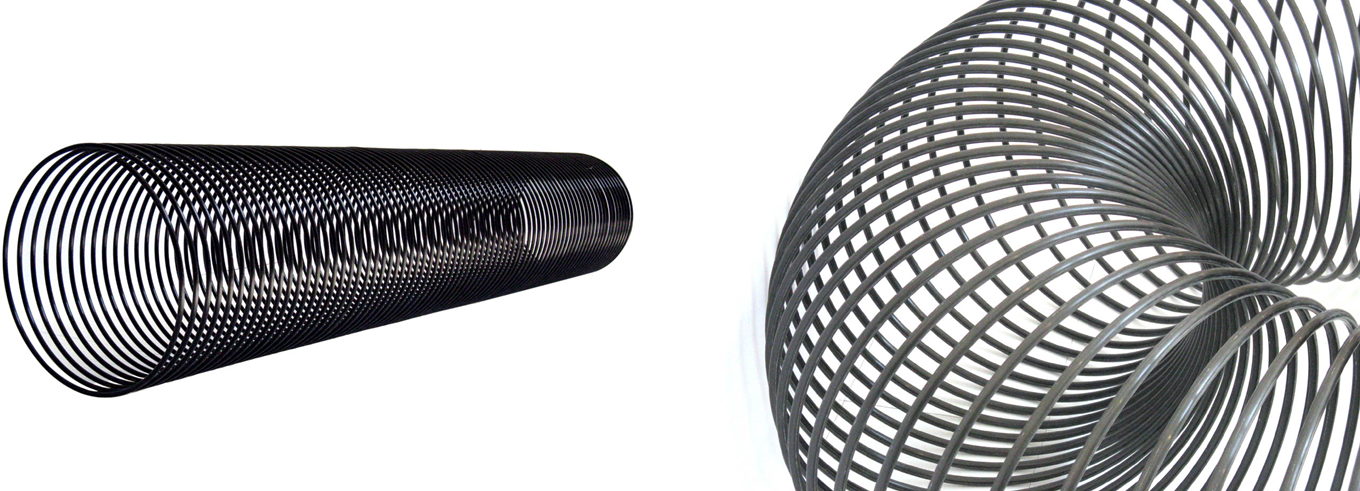
Flexible pultruded 3D-profile

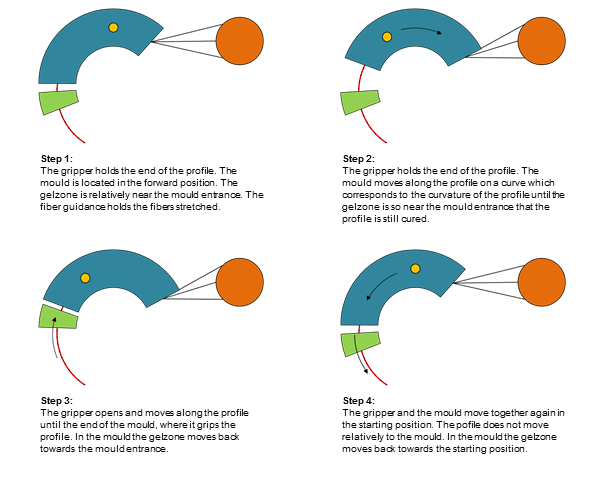

== Equipment ==
The design of pultrusion machines varies. Two often used types are reciprocating (hand-over-hand) and continuous (cat-track).

For the radius pultrusion process the layout of the machines has two moving stages similar to the hand over hand pulling unit, but as the process is intermittent with only one puller and the mould mounted on the stage of other one. Whether the stages are moving linear or circular depends on the type of profiles to be manufactured. The minimum radius for a linear machine with rotating stages is approx. 2 m. For smaller radii a circular movement of the mould and gripper stage is necessary.
