= Fiberglass =

Type of plastic reinforced by glass fiber

- Material type: Fiber-reinforced plastic

Physical properties
- Density (ρ): 1.5–2.5 g/cm³

Mechanical properties
- Tensile strength (σ_{t}): 2,000–3,500 MPa

Thermal properties
- Thermal conductivity (k): 0.035–0.045 W/m·K

Fiberglass (American English) or fibreglass (Commonwealth English) is a common type of fiber-reinforced plastic using glass fiber. The fibers may be randomly arranged, flattened into a sheet called a chopped strand mat, or woven into glass cloth. The plastic matrix may be a thermoset polymer matrix—most often based on thermosetting polymers such as epoxy, polyester resin, or vinyl ester resin—or a thermoplastic.

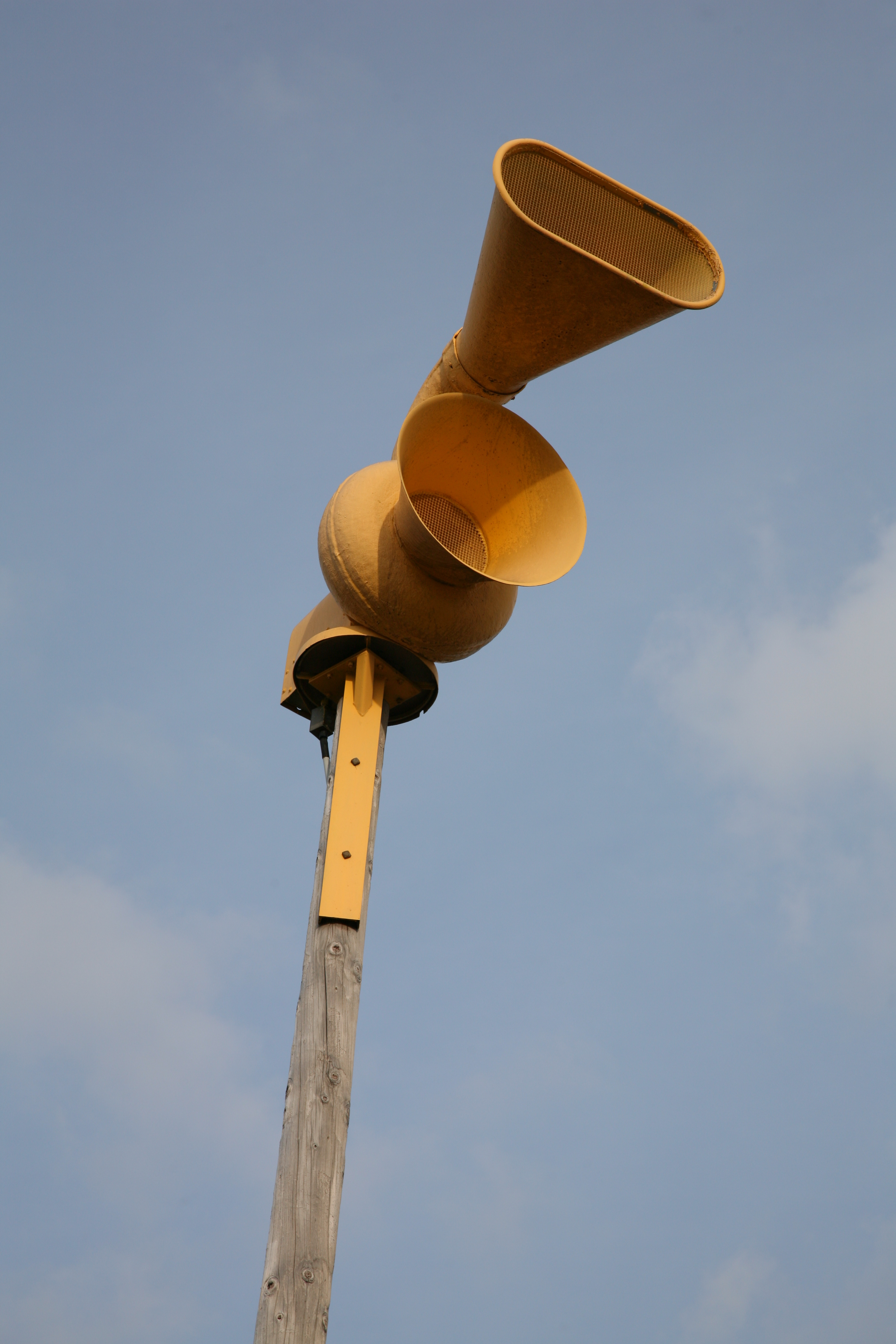
An 3rd gen ACA Allertor 125, which uses mainly fiberglass for the housing.

Cheaper and more flexible than carbon fiber, it is stronger than many metals by weight, non-magnetic, non-conductive, transparent to electromagnetic radiation, can be molded into complex shapes, and is chemically inert under many circumstances. Applications include aircraft, boats, automobiles, bath tubs and enclosures, swimming pools, hot tubs, septic tanks, water tanks, roofing, pipes, cladding, orthopedic casts, surfboards, external door skins, and even some civil defense sirens.

Other common names for fiberglass are glass-reinforced plastic (GRP), glass-fiber reinforced plastic (GFRP) or GFK (from German: Glasfaserverstärkter Kunststoff). Because glass fiber itself is sometimes referred to as "fiberglass", the composite is also called fiberglass-reinforced plastic (FRP). This article uses "fiberglass" to refer to the complete fiber-reinforced composite material, rather than only to the glass fiber within it.

== History ==
Glass fibers have been produced for centuries, but the earliest patent was awarded to the Prussian inventor Hermann Hammesfahr (1845–1914) in the U.S. in 1880.

Mass production of glass strands was accidentally discovered in 1932 when Games Slayter, a researcher at Owens-Illinois, directed a jet of compressed air at a stream of molten glass and produced fibers. A patent for this method of producing glass wool was first applied for in 1933. Owens joined with the Corning company in 1935 and the method was adapted by Owens Corning to produce its patented "Fiberglas" (spelled with one "s") in 1936. Originally, Fiberglas was a glass wool with fibers entrapping a great deal of gas, making it useful as an insulator, especially at high temperatures.

A suitable resin for combining the fiberglass with a plastic to produce a composite material was developed in 1936 by DuPont. The first ancestor of modern polyester resins is Cyanamid's resin of 1942. Peroxide curing systems were used by then. With the combination of fiberglass and resin the gas content of the material was replaced by plastic. This reduced the insulation properties to values typical of the plastic, but now for the first time, the composite showed great strength and promise as a structural and building material. Many glass fiber composites continued to be called "fiberglass" (as a generic name) and the name was also used for the low-density glass wool product containing gas instead of plastic.

Ray Greene of Owens Corning is credited with producing the first composite boat in 1937 but did not proceed further at the time because of the brittle nature of the plastic used. In 1939 the Soviet Union was reported to have constructed a passenger boat of plastic materials, and the United States a fuselage and wings of an aircraft. The first car to have a fiberglass body was a 1946 prototype of the Stout Scarab, but the model did not enter production.

== Fiber ==
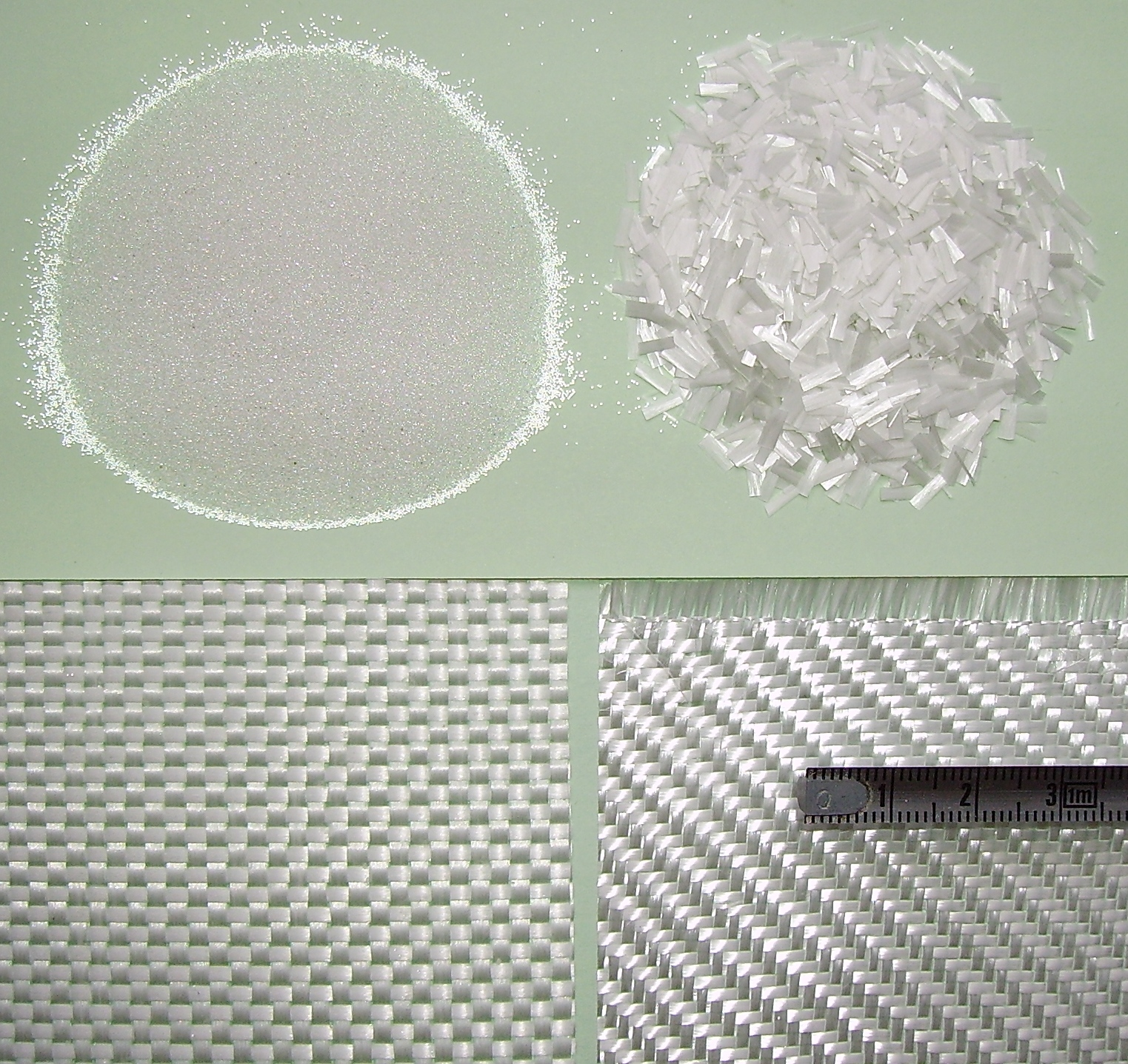
Glass reinforcements used for fiberglass are supplied in different physical forms: microspheres, chopped or woven glass cloth.

Unlike glass fibers used for insulation, strong structural fiber surfaces must be almost entirely free of defects in order to reach gigapascal tensile strengths. If a bulk piece of glass were defect-free, it would be as strong as glass fibers; however, it is generally impractical to produce and maintain bulk material in a defect-free state outside of laboratory conditions.

=== Production ===
The process of manufacturing fiberglass is called pultrusion. The manufacturing process for glass fibers suitable for reinforcement uses large furnaces to gradually melt the silica sand, limestone, kaolin, fluorspar, colemanite, dolomite and other minerals until a liquid forms. It is then extruded through bushings (spinneret), which are bundles of very small orifices (typically 5–25 micrometers in diameter for E-Glass, 9 micrometers for S-Glass).

These filaments are then sized (coated) with a chemical solution. The individual filaments are now bundled in large numbers to provide a roving. The diameter of the filaments, and the number of filaments in the roving, determine its weight, typically expressed in one of two measurement systems:

- yield, or yards per pound (the number of yards of fiber in one pound of material; thus a smaller number means a heavier roving). Examples of standard yields are 225yield, 450yield, 675yield.
- tex, or grams per km (how many grams 1 km of roving weighs, inverted from yield; thus a smaller number means a lighter roving). Examples of standard tex are 750tex, 1100tex, 2200tex.

These rovings are then either used directly in a composite application such as pultrusion, filament winding (pipe), gun roving (where an automated gun chops the glass into short lengths and drops it into a jet of resin, projected onto the surface of a mold), or in an intermediary step, to manufacture fabrics such as chopped strand mat (CSM) (made of randomly oriented small cut lengths of fiber all bonded together), woven fabrics, knit fabrics or unidirectional fabrics.

==== Chopped strand mat ====
Chopped strand mat (CSM) is a form of reinforcement used in fiberglass. It consists of glass fibers laid randomly across each other and held together by a binder. It is typically processed using the hand lay-up technique, where sheets of material are placed on a mold and brushed with resin. Because the binder dissolves in resin, the material easily conforms to different shapes when wetted out. After the resin cures, the hardened product can be taken from the mold and finished. Using chopped strand mat gives the fiberglass isotropic in-plane material properties.

=== Sizing ===
A coating or primer is applied to the roving to help protect the glass filaments for processing and manipulation and to ensure proper bonding to the resin matrix, thus allowing for the transfer of shear loads from the glass fibers to the thermoset plastic. Without this bonding, the fibers can 'slip' in the matrix causing localized failure.

== Properties ==
An individual structural glass fiber is both stiff and strong in tension and compression—that is, along its axis. Although it might be assumed that the fiber is weak in compression, it is actually only the long aspect ratio of the fiber which makes it seem so; i.e., because a typical fiber is long and narrow, it buckles easily. On the other hand, the glass fiber is weak in shear—that is, across its axis. Therefore, if a collection of fibers can be arranged permanently in a preferred direction within a material, and if they can be prevented from buckling in compression, the material will be preferentially strong in that direction.

Furthermore, by laying multiple layers of fiber on top of one another, with each layer oriented in various preferred directions, the material's overall stiffness and strength can be efficiently controlled. In fiberglass, it is the plastic matrix which permanently constrains the structural glass fibers to directions chosen by the designer. With chopped strand mat, this directionality is essentially an entire two-dimensional plane; with woven fabrics or unidirectional layers, directionality of stiffness and strength can be more precisely controlled within the plane.

A fiberglass component is typically of a thin "shell" construction, sometimes filled on the inside with structural foam, as in the case of surfboards. The component may be of nearly arbitrary shape, limited only by the complexity and tolerances of the mold used for manufacturing the shell.

The mechanical functionality of materials is heavily reliant on the combined performances of both the resin (AKA matrix) and fibers. For example, in severe temperature conditions (over 180 °C), the resin component of the composite may lose its functionality, partially due to bond deterioration of resin and fiber. However, GFRPs can still show significant residual strength after experiencing high temperatures (200 °C).

One notable feature of fiberglass is that the resins used are subject to contraction during the curing process. For polyester this contraction is often 5–6%; for epoxy, about 2%. Because the fibers do not contract, this differential can create changes in the shape of the part during curing. Distortions can appear hours, days, or weeks after the resin has set. While this distortion can be minimized by symmetric use of the fibers in the design, a certain amount of internal stress is created; and if it becomes too great, cracks form.

=== Types ===
The most common types of glass fiber used in fiberglass is E-glass, which is alumino-borosilicate glass with less than 1% w/w alkali oxides, mainly used for glass-reinforced plastics. Other types of glass used are A-glass (Alkali-lime glass with little or no boron oxide), E-CR-glass (Electrical/Chemical Resistance; alumino-lime silicate with less than 1% w/w alkali oxides, with high acid resistance), C-glass (alkali-lime glass with high boron oxide content, used for glass staple fibers and insulation), D-glass (borosilicate glass, named for its low Dielectric constant), R-glass (alumino silicate glass without MgO and CaO with high mechanical requirements as Reinforcement), and S-glass (alumino silicate glass without CaO but with high MgO content with high tensile strength).

Pure silica (silicon dioxide), when cooled as fused quartz into a glass with no true melting point, can be used as a glass fiber for fiberglass but has the drawback that it must be worked at very high temperatures. In order to lower the necessary work temperature, other materials are introduced as "fluxing agents" (i.e., components to lower the melting point). Ordinary A-glass ("A" for "alkali-lime") or soda lime glass, crushed and ready to be remelted, as so-called cullet glass, was the first type of glass used for fiberglass. E-glass ("E" because of initial Electrical application), is alkali-free and was the first glass formulation used for continuous filament formation. It now makes up most of the fiberglass production in the world, and also is the single largest consumer of boron minerals globally. It is susceptible to chloride ion attack and is a poor choice for marine applications. S-glass ("S" for "stiff") is used when tensile strength (high modulus) is important and is thus an important building and aircraft epoxy composite (it is called R-glass, "R" for "reinforcement" in Europe). C-glass ("C" for "chemical resistance") and T-glass ("T" is for "thermal insulator"—a North American variant of C-glass) are resistant to chemical attack; both are often found in insulation-grades of blown fiberglass.

=== Table of some common fiberglass types ===
Material	Specific gravity	Tensile strength MPa (ksi)	Compressive strength MPa (ksi)
Polyester resin (Not reinforced)	1.28	55 (7.98)	140 (20.3)
Polyester and Chopped Strand Mat Laminate 30% E-glass	1.4	100 (14.5)	150 (21.8)
Polyester and Woven Rovings Laminate 45% E-glass	1.6	250 (36.3)	150 (21.8)
Polyester and Satin Weave Cloth Laminate 55% E-glass	1.7	300 (43.5)	250 (36.3)
Polyester and Continuous Rovings Laminate 70% E-glass	1.9	800 (116)	350 (50.8)
E-Glass Epoxy composite	1.99	1,770 (257)	
S-Glass Epoxy composite	1.95	2,358 (342)	

== Applications ==
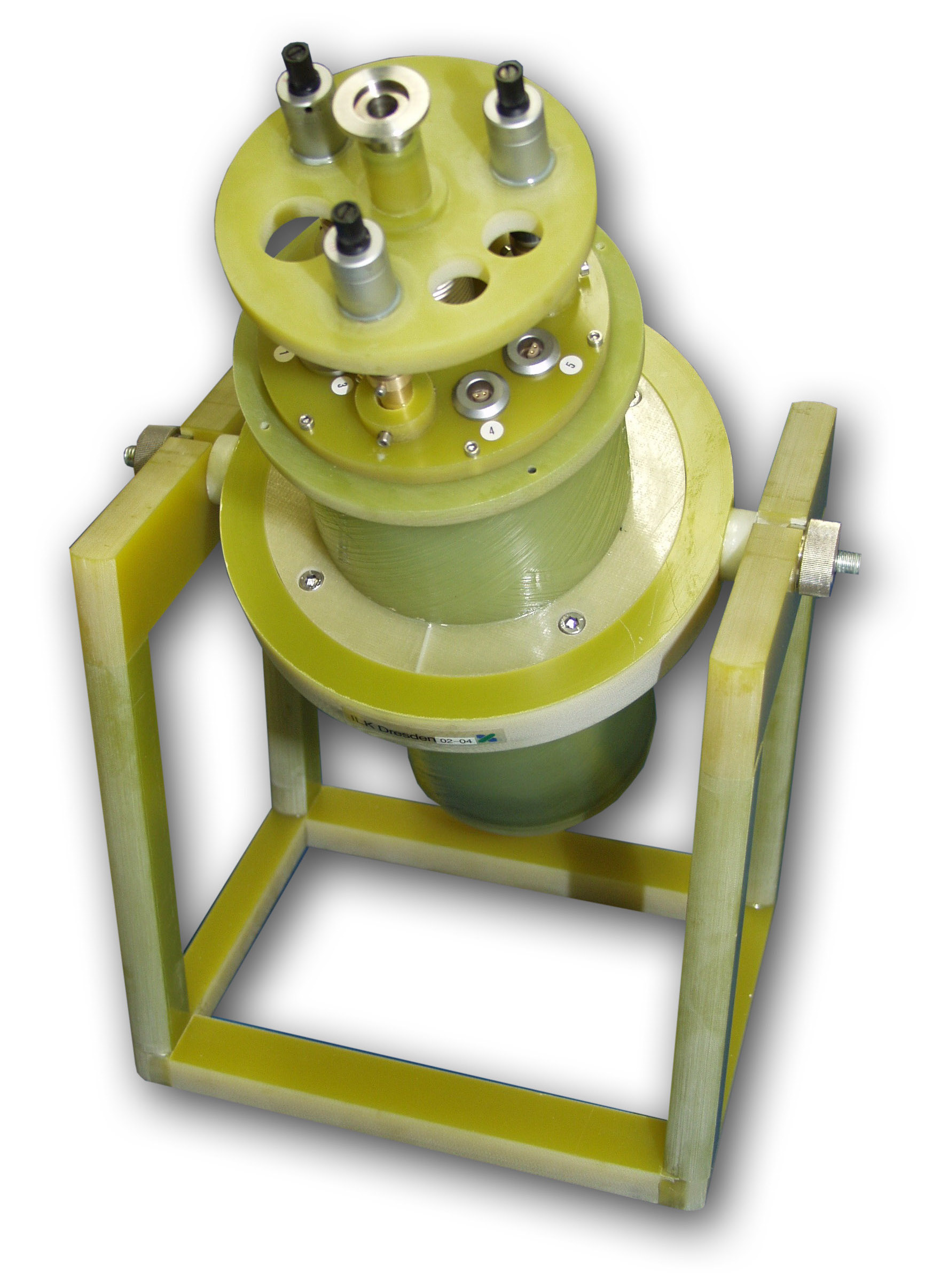
A cryostat made of fiberglass

Fiberglass is versatile because it is lightweight, strong, weather-resistant, and can have a variety of surface textures.

During World War II, fiberglass was developed as a replacement for the molded plywood used in aircraft radomes (fiberglass being transparent to microwaves). Its first main civilian application was for the building of boats and sports car bodies, where it gained acceptance in the 1950s. Its use has broadened to the automotive and sport equipment sectors. In the production of some products, such as aircraft, carbon fiber is now used instead of fiberglass, which is stronger by volume and weight.

Advanced manufacturing techniques such as pre-pregs and fiber rovings extend fiberglass's applications and the tensile strength possible with fiber-reinforced plastics.

Fiberglass is also used in the telecommunications industry for shrouding antennas, due to its RF permeability and low signal attenuation properties. It may also be used to conceal other equipment where no signal permeability is required, such as equipment cabinets and steel support structures, due to the ease with which it can be molded and painted to blend with existing structures and surfaces. Other uses include sheet-form electrical insulators and structural components commonly found in power-industry products. Because of fiberglass's lightweight and durability, it is often used in protective equipment such as helmets. Many sports use fiberglass protective gear, such as goaltenders' and catchers' masks.

=== Storage tanks ===
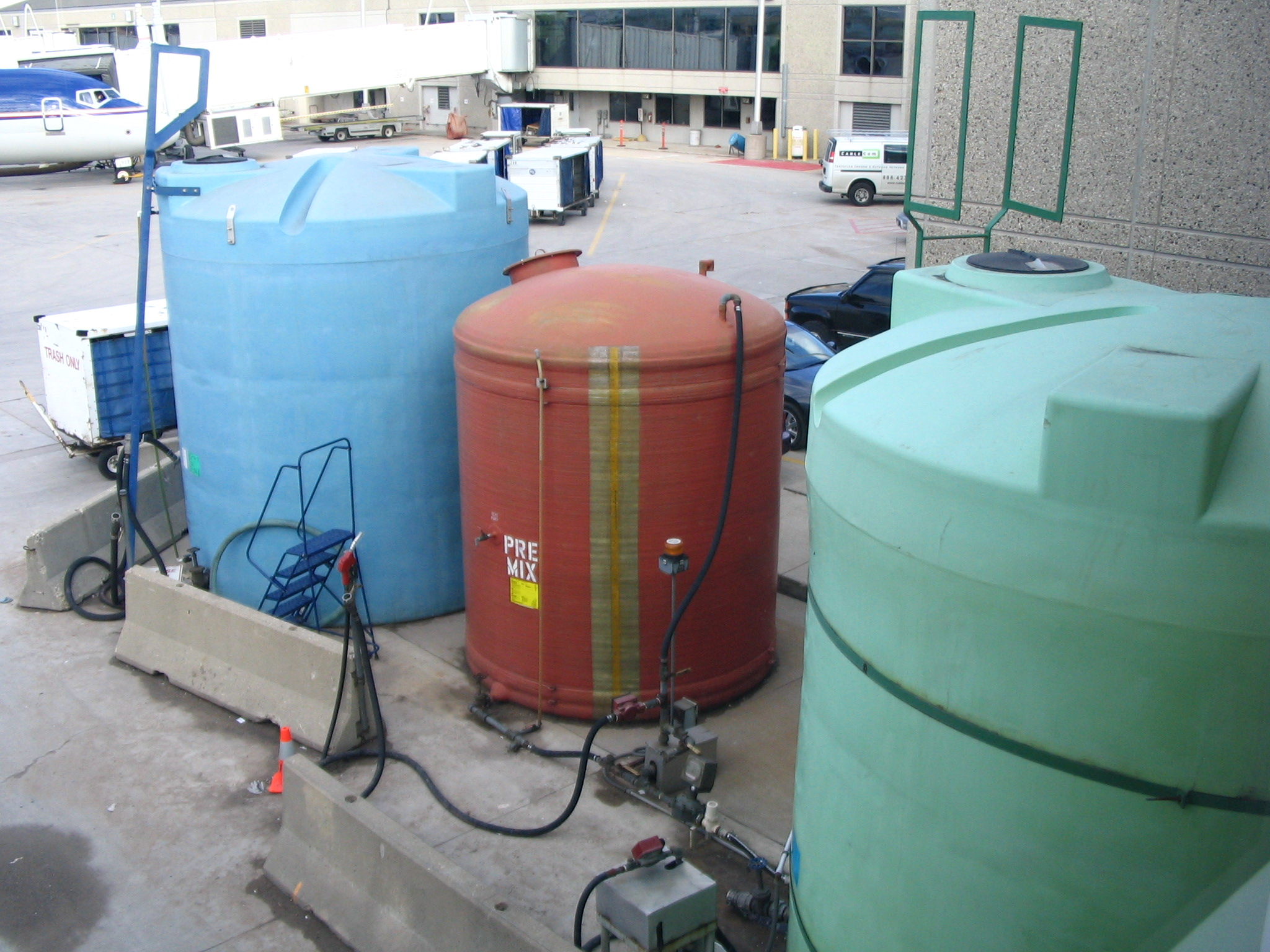
Several large fiberglass tanks at an airport

Storage tanks can be made of fiberglass with capacities up to about 300 tonnes. Smaller tanks can be made with chopped strand mat cast over a thermoplastic inner tank which acts as a preform during construction. Much more reliable tanks are made using woven mat or filament wound fiber, with the fiber orientation at right angles to the hoop stress imposed in the sidewall by the contents. Such tanks tend to be used for chemical storage because the plastic liner (often polypropylene) is resistant to a wide range of corrosive chemicals. Fiberglass is also used for septic tanks.

=== House building ===
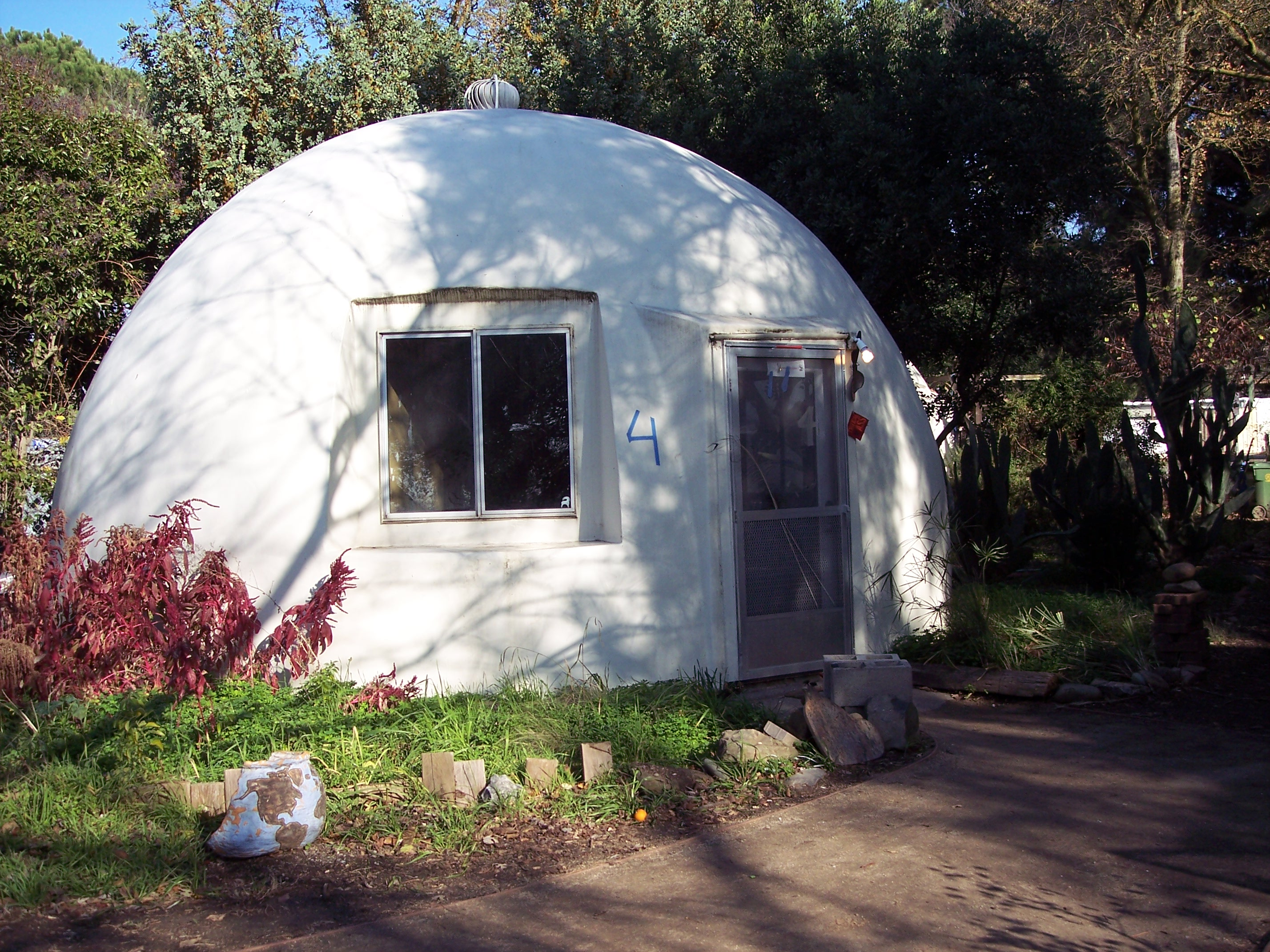
A fiberglass dome house in Davis, California

Glass-reinforced plastics are also used to produce house building components such as roofing laminate, door surrounds, over-door canopies, window canopies and dormers, chimneys, coping systems, and heads with keystones and sills. The material's reduced weight and easier handling, compared to wood or metal, allows faster installation. Mass-produced fiberglass brick-effect panels can be used in the construction of composite housing, and can include insulation to reduce heat loss.

=== Oil and gas artificial lift systems ===
In rod pumping applications, fiberglass rods are often used for their high tensile strength to weight ratio. Fiberglass rods provide an advantage over steel rods because they stretch more elastically (lower Young's modulus) than steel for a given weight, meaning more oil can be lifted from the hydrocarbon reservoir to the surface with each stroke, all while reducing the load on the pumping unit.

Fiberglass rods must be kept in tension, however, as they frequently part if placed in even a small amount of compression. The buoyancy of the rods within a fluid amplifies this tendency.

=== Piping ===
GRP and GRE pipe can be used in a variety of above- and below-ground systems, including those for desalination, water treatment, water distribution networks, chemical process plants, water used for firefighting, hot and cold drinking water, wastewater/sewage, municipal waste and liquified petroleum gas.

=== Boating ===
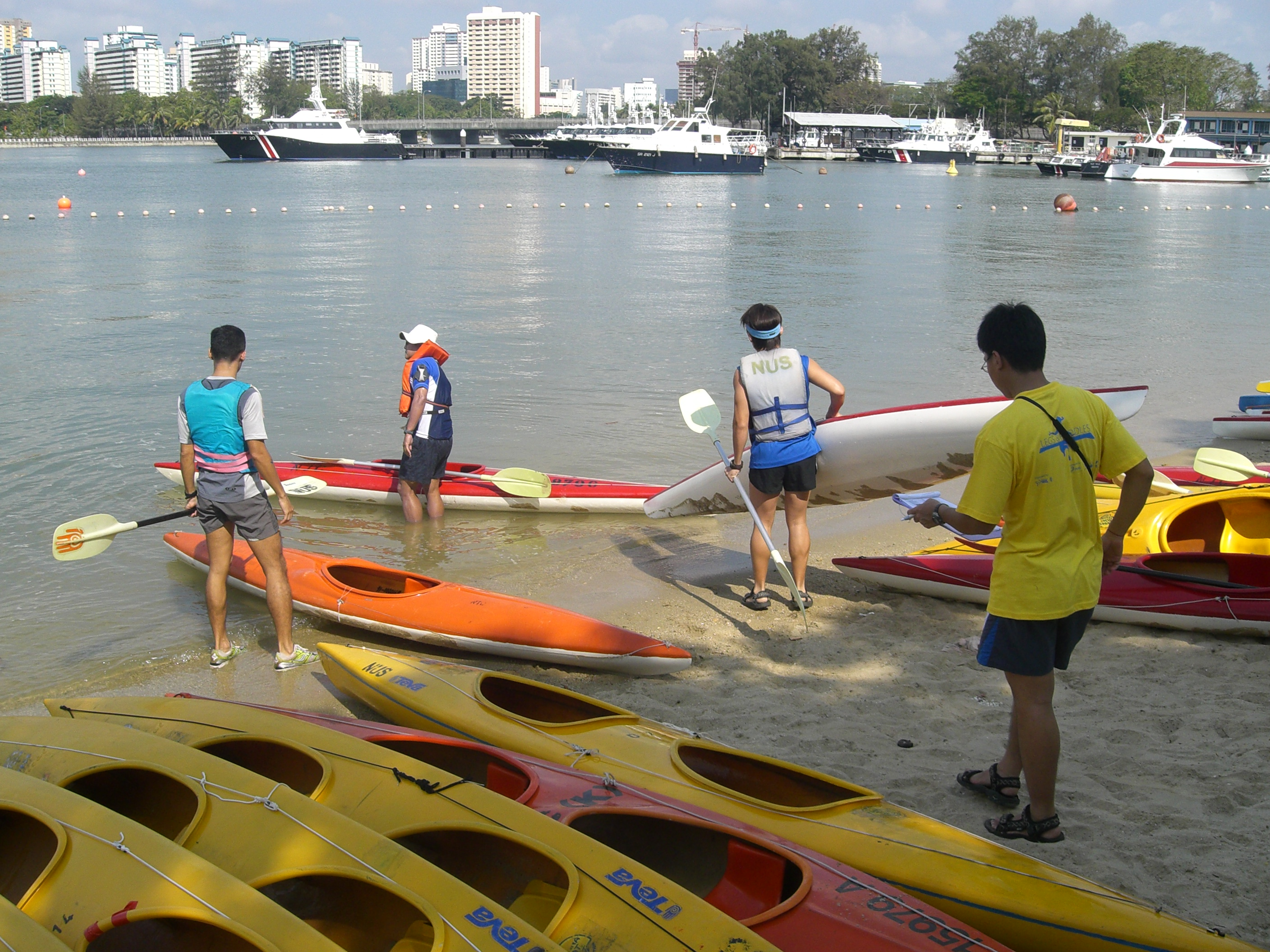
Kayaks made of fiberglass

Fiberglass composite boats have been made since the early 1940s, and many sailing vessels made after 1950 were built using the fiberglass lay-up process. As of 2022, boats continue to be made with fiberglass, though more advanced techniques such as vacuum bag molding are used in the construction process.

=== Armour ===
Though most bullet-resistant armours are made using different textiles, fiberglass composites have been shown to be effective as ballistic armor.

== Construction methods ==
=== Filament winding ===
Filament winding is a fabrication technique mainly used for manufacturing open (cylinders) or closed-end structures (pressure vessels or tanks). The process involves winding filaments under tension over a male mandrel. The mandrel rotates while a wind eye on a carriage moves horizontally, laying down fibers in the desired pattern. The most common filaments are carbon or glass fiber and are coated with synthetic resin as they are wound. Once the mandrel is completely covered to the desired thickness, the resin is cured; often the mandrel is placed in an oven to achieve this, though sometimes radiant heaters are used with the mandrel still turning in the machine. Once the resin has cured, the mandrel is removed, leaving the hollow final product. For some products such as gas bottles, the 'mandrel' is a permanent part of the finished product forming a liner to prevent gas leakage or as a barrier to protect the composite from the fluid to be stored.

Filament winding is well suited to automation, and there are many applications, such as pipe and small pressure vessels that are wound and cured without any human intervention. The controlled variables for winding are fiber type, resin content, wind angle, tow or bandwidth and thickness of the fiber bundle. The angle at which the fiber has an effect on the properties of the final product. A high angle "hoop" will provide circumferential or "burst" strength, while lower angle patterns (polar or helical) will provide greater longitudinal tensile strength.

Products currently being produced using this technique range from pipes, golf clubs, Reverse Osmosis Membrane Housings, oars, bicycle forks, bicycle rims, power and transmission poles, pressure vessels to missile casings, aircraft fuselages and lamp posts and yacht masts.

=== Fiberglass hand lay-up operation ===
A release agent, usually in either wax or liquid form, is applied to the chosen mold to allow the finished product to be cleanly removed from the mold. Resin—typically a 2-part thermoset polyester, vinyl, or epoxy—is mixed with its hardener and applied to the surface. Sheets of fiberglass matting are laid into the mold, then more resin mixture is added using a brush or roller. The material must conform to the mold, and air must not be trapped between the fiberglass and the mold. Additional resin is applied and possibly additional sheets of fiberglass. Hand pressure, vacuum or rollers are used to be sure the resin saturates and fully wets all layers, and that any air pockets are removed. The work must be done quickly before the resin starts to cure unless high-temperature resins are used which will not cure until the part is warmed in an oven. In some cases, the work is covered with plastic sheets and vacuum is drawn on the work to remove air bubbles and press the fiberglass to the shape of the mold.

=== Fiberglass spray lay-up operation ===
The fiberglass spray lay-up process is similar to the hand lay-up process but differs in the application of the fiber and resin to the mold. Spray-up is an open-molding composites fabrication process where resin and reinforcements are sprayed onto a mold. The resin and glass may be applied separately or simultaneously "chopped" in a combined stream from a chopper gun. Workers roll out the spray-up to compact the laminate. Wood, foam or other core material may then be added, and a secondary spray-up layer imbeds the core between the laminates. The part is then cured, cooled, and removed from the reusable mold.

=== Pultrusion operation ===
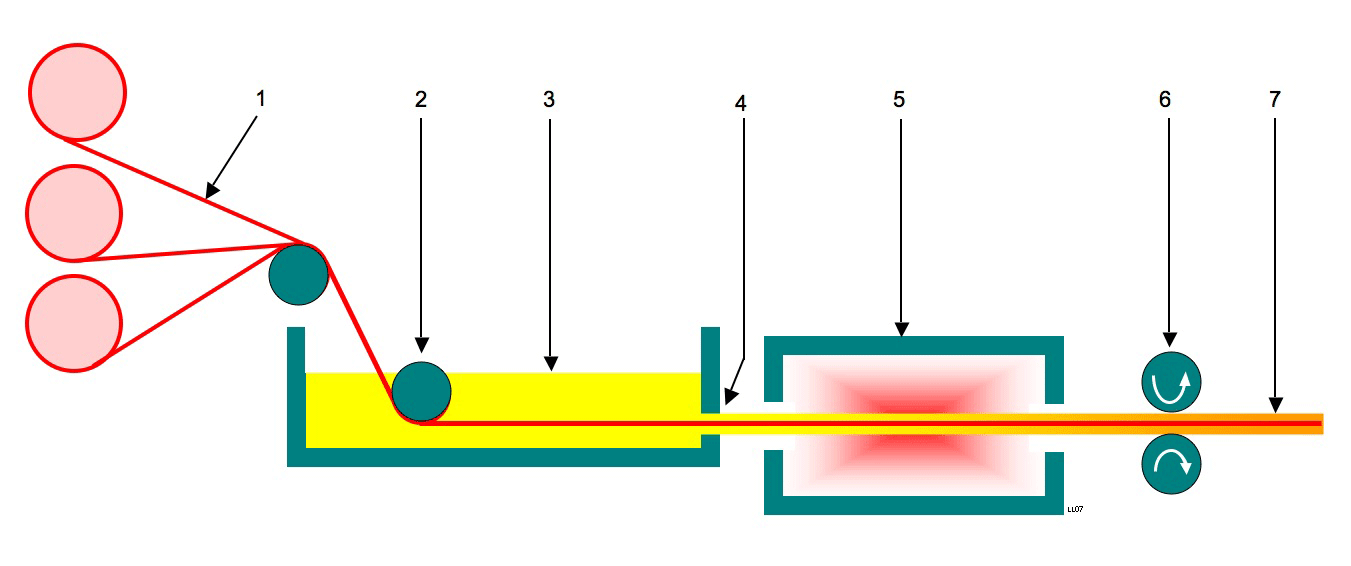
Diagram of the pultrusion process

Pultrusion is a manufacturing method used to make strong, lightweight composite materials. In pultrusion, material is pulled through forming machinery using either a hand-over-hand method or a continuous-roller method (as opposed to extrusion, where the material is pushed through dies). In fiberglass pultrusion, fibers (the glass material) are pulled from spools through a device that coats them with a resin. They are then typically heat-treated and cut to length. Fiberglass produced this way can be made in a variety of shapes and cross-sections, such as W or S cross-sections.

== Health hazards ==
=== Exposure ===
People can be exposed to fiberglass in the workplace during its fabrication, installation or removal, by breathing it in, by skin contact, or by eye contact. Furthermore, in the manufacturing process of fiberglass, styrene vapors are released while the resins are cured. These are also irritating to mucous membranes and the respiratory tract. The general population can get exposed to fiberglass from insulation and building materials or from fibers in the air near manufacturing facilities or when they are near building fires or implosions. The American Lung Association advises that fiberglass insulation should never be left exposed in an occupied area. Since work practices are not always followed, and fiberglass is often left exposed in basements that later become occupied, people can get exposed. No readily usable biological or clinical indices of exposure exist.

=== Symptoms and signs, health effects ===
Fiberglass will irritate the eyes, skin, and the respiratory system. Hence, symptoms can include itchy eyes, skin, nose, sore throat, hoarseness, dyspnea (breathing difficulty) and cough. Peak alveolar deposition was observed in rodents and humans for fibers with diameters of 1 to 2 μm. In animal experiments, adverse lung effects such as lung inflammation and lung fibrosis have occurred, and increased incidences of mesothelioma, pleural sarcoma, and lung carcinoma had been found with intrapleural or intratracheal instillations in rats.

As of 2001, in humans only the more biopersistent materials like ceramic fibers, which are used industrially as insulation in high-temperature environments such as blast furnaces, and certain special-purpose glass wools not used as insulating materials, remain classified as possible carcinogens (IARC Group 2B). The more commonly used glass fibre wools including insulation glass wool, rock wool and slag wool are considered not classifiable as to carcinogenicity to humans (IARC Group 3). In October 2001, all fiberglass wools commonly used for thermal and acoustical insulation were reclassified by the International Agency for Research on Cancer (IARC) as "not classifiable as to carcinogenicity to humans" (IARC group 3). "Epidemiologic studies published during the 15 years since the previous IARC monographs review of these fibers in 1988 provide no evidence of increased risks of lung cancer or mesothelioma (cancer of the lining of the body cavities) from occupational exposures during the manufacture of these materials, and inadequate evidence overall of any cancer risk." In June 2011, the US National Toxicology Program (NTP) removed from its Report on Carcinogens all biosoluble glass wool used in home and building insulation and for non-insulation products. However, NTP still considers fibrous glass dust to be "reasonably anticipated [as] a human carcinogen (Certain Glass Wool Fibers (Inhalable))". Similarly, California's Office of Environmental Health Hazard Assessment (OEHHA) published a November, 2011 modification to its Proposition 65 listing to include only "Glass wool fibers (inhalable and biopersistent)." Therefore, a cancer warning label for biosoluble fiber glass home and building insulation is no longer required under federal or California law. As of 2012, the North American Insulation Manufacturers Association stated that fiberglass is safe to manufacture, install and use when recommended work practices are followed to reduce temporary mechanical irritation.

As of 2012, the European Union and Germany have classified synthetic glass fibers as possibly or probably carcinogenic, but fibers can be exempt from this classification if they pass specific tests. A 2012 health hazard review for the European Commission stated that inhalation of fiberglass at concentrations of 3, 16 and 30 mg/m3 "did not induce fibrosis nor tumours except transient lung inflammation that disappeared after a post-exposure recovery period." Historic reviews of the epidemiology studies had been conducted by Harvard's Medical and Public Health Schools in 1995, the National Academy of Sciences in 2000, the Agency for Toxic Substances and Disease Registry ("ATSDR") in 2004, and the National Toxicology Program in 2011. which reached the same conclusion as IARC that there is no evidence of increased risk from occupational exposure to glass wool fibers.

=== Pathophysiology ===
Genetic and toxic effects are exerted through production of reactive oxygen species, which can damage DNA, and cause chromosomal aberrations, nuclear abnormalities, mutations, gene amplification in proto-oncogenes, and cell transformation in mammalian cells. There is also indirect, inflammation-driven genotoxicity through reactive oxygen species by inflammatory cells. The longer and thinner as well as the more durable (biopersistent) fibers were, the more potent they were in damage.

=== Regulation, exposure limits ===
In the US, fine mineral fiber emissions have been regulated by the EPA, but respirable fibers (“particulates not otherwise regulated”) are regulated by Occupational Safety and Health Administration (OSHA); OSHA has set the legal limit (permissible exposure limit) for fiberglass exposure in the workplace as 15 mg/m^{3} total and 5 mg/m^{3} in respiratory exposure over an 8-hour workday. The National Institute for Occupational Safety and Health (NIOSH) has set a recommended exposure limit (REL) of 3 fibers/cm^{3} (less than 3.5 micrometers in diameter and greater than 10 micrometers in length) as a time-weighted average over an 8-hour workday, and a 5 mg/m^{3} total limit.

As of 2001, the Hazardous Substances Ordinance in Germany dictates a maximum occupational exposure limit of 86 mg/m^{3}. In certain concentrations, a potentially explosive mixture may occur. Further manufacture of GRP components (grinding, cutting, sawing) creates fine dust and chips containing glass filaments, as well as tacky dust, in quantities high enough to affect health and the functionality of machines and equipment. The installation of effective extraction and filtration equipment is required to ensure safety and efficiency.

== See also ==
- Bulk molding compound
- G-10 (material)
- Glass fiber reinforced concrete
- Hobas
- Ignace Dubus-Bonnel
- Sheet molding compound
- Carbon-fiber-reinforced polymers reinforcement with carbon fibers.
