= Composite laminate =

Assembly of layers of fibrous composite materials

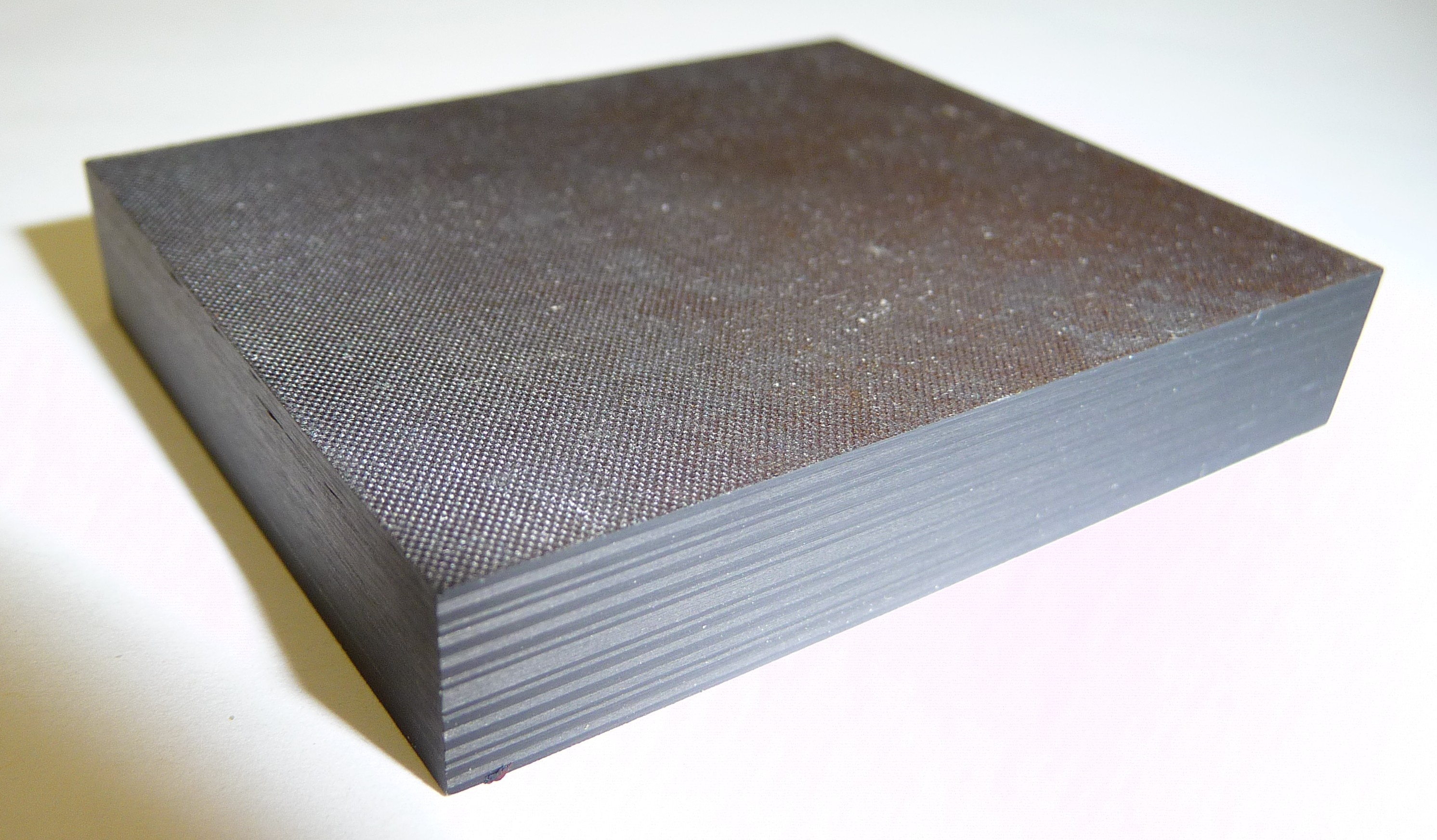
A small sample of aerospace grade carbon-fibre/epoxy laminate

In materials science, a composite laminate is an assembly of layers of fibrous composite materials which can be joined to provide required engineering properties, including in-plane stiffness, bending stiffness, strength, and coefficient of thermal expansion.

The individual layers consist of high-modulus, high-strength fibers in a polymeric, metallic, or ceramic matrix material. Typical fibers used include cellulose, graphite, glass, boron, and silicon carbide, and some matrix materials are epoxies, polyimides, aluminium, titanium, and alumina.

Layers of different materials may be used, resulting in a hybrid laminate. The individual layers generally are orthotropic (that is, with principal properties in orthogonal directions) or transversely isotropic (with isotropic properties in the transverse plane) with the laminate then exhibiting anisotropic (with variable direction of principal properties), orthotropic, or quasi-isotropic properties. Quasi-isotropic laminates exhibit isotropic (that is, independent of direction) inplane response but are not restricted to isotropic out-of-plane (bending) response. Depending upon the stacking sequence of the individual layers, the laminate may exhibit coupling between inplane and out-of-plane response. An example of bending-stretching coupling is the presence of curvature developing as a result of in-plane loading.

== Classical laminate theory ==
Classical laminate theory models the deformation of a laminate in response to external forces and moments under a set of assumptions. The key assumptions are:

- The laminate consists of a stack of orthotropic plies.
- The overall thickness is small compared to the other dimensions and constant.
- The displacements of the laminate are small compared to the overall thickness.
- The in-plane strains are small compared to unity.
- The transverse normal strain and shear strains can be neglected.
- In-plane displacements and strains are linear functions of the through-thickness coordinate.
- Each ply obeys Hooke's law and hence all of their stresses and strains may be related by a system of linear equations. This is the case for a broad range of lamina materials.
- The transverse shear stresses are zero at the surfaces of the laminate, where $z = \pm t/2$.

The laminate's deformation can be represented by the three orthogonal strains of the mid-plane/surface, $\underline{\varepsilon}$, and three changes in curvature, $\underline{\kappa}$:

$$\underline{\varepsilon}^0 = \begin{bmatrix} \varepsilon^0_x \\ \varepsilon^0_y \\ \tau^0_{xy} \end{bmatrix}$$
and
$$\underline{\kappa}  =  \begin{bmatrix} \kappa_x \\ \kappa_y \\ \kappa_{xy} \end{bmatrix}$$

where $x$ and $y$ define a global co-ordinate system. Because of the assumption that the strains resulting from curvature vary linearly along the $z$ axis (in the through-thickness direction), the total in-plane strains for each ply are a sum of those derived from membrane loads and bending loads expressed as

$$\underline{\varepsilon} = \underline{\varepsilon}^0 + z \underline{\kappa}$$

Individual plies have local co-ordinate axes which are aligned with the materials characteristic directions; such as the principal directions of its elasticity tensor. Uni-directional ply's for example always have their first axis aligned with the direction of the reinforcement. A laminate is a stack of n individual plies having a set of ply orientations

$$\begin{bmatrix} \theta_1, & \theta_2, & \dots & \theta_n \end{bmatrix}$$

which have a strong influence on both the stiffness and strength of the laminate as a whole. Rotating an anisotropic material results in a variation of its elasticity tensor. In each ply's local co-ordinates, it is assumed to behave according to the stress-strain law

$$\underline{\sigma} = \mathbf{Q}\underline{\varepsilon}$$

where $\mathbf{Q}$ is the stiffness matrix for an individual ply. Transforming the local co-ordinates to the global x-y co-ordinates requires an in-plane rotation by angle $\theta$, which can be performed using the rotation matrix $\mathbf{T}$. This gives the transformed stiffness matrix $\mathbf{\bar{Q}}$ with modified elasticity terms:

$$\begin{align}
\mathbf{\bar{Q}} &= \mathbf{T}^{-1}\mathbf{Q}\mathbf{T}^\mathsf{-T} \\
\bar{Q}_{11} &= Q_{11}\cos^4\theta + 2(Q_{12} + 2Q_{66})\sin^2\theta \cos^2\theta + Q_{22}\sin^4 \theta \\
\bar{Q}_{22} &= Q_{11}\sin^4\theta + 2(Q_{12} + 2Q_{66})\sin^2\theta\cos^2\theta + Q_{22}\cos^4 \theta \\
\bar{Q}_{12} &= (Q_{11} + Q_{22} - 4 Q_{66})\sin^2\theta \cos^2 \theta + Q_{12}(\sin^4 \theta + \cos^4 \theta) \\
\bar{Q}_{66} &= (Q_{11} + Q_{22} - 2 Q_{12} - 2 Q_{66})\sin^2\theta \cos^2 \theta + Q_{66}(\sin^4 \theta + \cos^4 \theta) \\
\bar{Q}_{16} &= (Q_{11} - Q_{12} - 2 Q_{66})\cos^3\theta \sin \theta - (Q_{22}-Q_{12}-2Q_{66})\cos \theta \sin^3 \theta \\
\bar{Q}_{26} &= (Q_{11} - Q_{12} - 2 Q_{66})\cos\theta \sin^3 \theta - (Q_{22}-Q_{12}-2Q_{66})\cos^3 \theta \sin \theta
\end{align}$$

Hence, in the global co-ordinate system:

$$\underline{\sigma} = \mathbf{\bar{Q}} \underline{\varepsilon}$$

The external loading can be summarised by six stress resultants: three membrane forces (forces per unit length) given by $N$ to define the in-plane loading, and three bending moments per unit length given by $M$ to define the out-of-plane loading. These may be calculated the stresses, $\underline{\sigma}$, as follows:

$N = \int_{-t/2}^{t/2} \underline{\sigma} \, dz = \sum_{k=1}^n \left( \int_{-z_k}^{z_{k-1}} \underline{\sigma}_k \, dz \right) \quad$ are the three membrane forces per unit length and

$M = \int_{-t/2}^{t/2} \underline{\sigma} z \, dz = \sum_{k=1}^n \left( \int_{-z_k}^{z_{k-1}} \underline{\sigma}_k z \, dz \right) \quad$ are the three bending moments per unit length.

The stiffness properties of composite laminates may be found by integration of in-plane stress along the $z$ axis, normal to the laminate's surface. Once part of a laminate, the transformed elasticity is treated as a piecewise function along the $z$ axis (in the thickness direction), hence the integration operation may be treated as the sum of a series of n plies, giving

$$\begin{bmatrix}
N \\
M \end{bmatrix}  =
\begin{bmatrix}
\mathbf{A} & \mathbf{B} \\
\mathbf{B}  & \mathbf{D}
\end{bmatrix}   \begin{bmatrix}
\underline{\varepsilon}^0 \\
\underline{\kappa} \end{bmatrix}$$

where

$A_{ij} = \sum^{n}_{k=1} (\bar{Q}_{ij})_k \left( z_k - z_{k-1} \right) \quad$ are the laminate extensional stiffnesses,

$B_{ij} = \frac{1}{2}\sum^{n}_{k=1} (\bar{Q}_{ij})_k \left( z^2_k - z^2_{k-1} \right) \quad$ are the laminate coupling stiffnesses and

$D_{ij} = \frac{1}{3}\sum^{n}_{k=1} (\bar{Q}_{ij})_k \left( z^3_k - z^3_{k-1} \right) \quad$ are the laminate bending stiffnesses.

== Properties ==
=== Balanced ===
A laminate may be described as balanced if there are no tensile-shear interactions.

=== Symmetric ===
A laminate may be described as symmetric if the order of the layup could be flipped and remain unchanged, i.e. there is a plane of symmetry parallel to the plane of the laminate. This results in no bending-stretching coupling and so matrix B is 0.

== See also ==
- Carbon-fiber-reinforced polymer
- Composite material
- High-pressure laminate
- Lamination
- Lay-up process
- Void (composites)
- Double-double laminates
