= Blade pitch =

Angle of a blade in a fluid

Blade pitch or simply pitch refers to the angle of a blade in a fluid. The term has applications in aeronautics, shipping, and other fields.

== Aeronautics ==
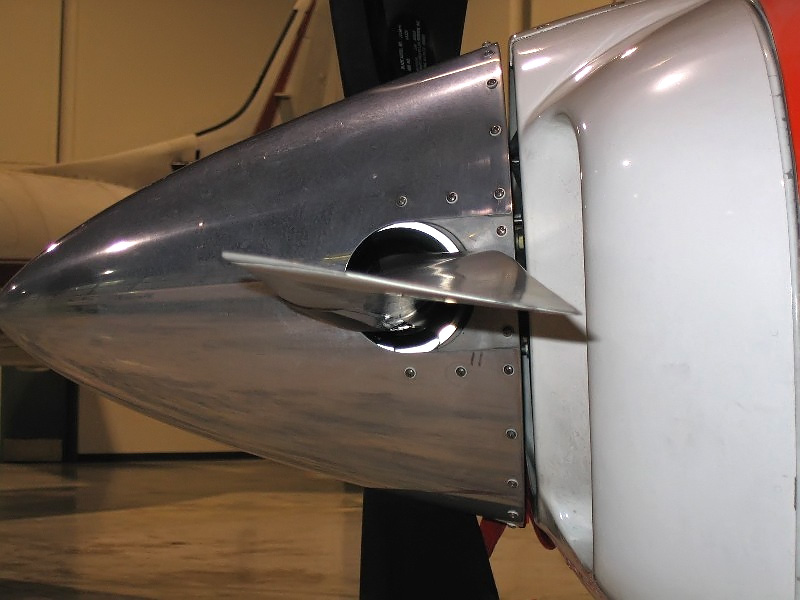
A propeller blade in feathered position

In aeronautics, blade pitch refers to the angle of the blades of an aircraft propeller or helicopter rotor. Blade pitch is measured relative to the aircraft body. It is usually described as "fine" or "low" for a more vertical blade angle, and "coarse" or "high" for a more horizontal blade angle.

Blade pitch is normally described as a ratio of forward distance per rotation assuming no slip.

Blade pitch acts much like the gearing of the final drive of a car. Low pitch yields good low speed acceleration (and climb rate in an aircraft) while high pitch optimizes high speed performance and fuel economy.

It is quite common for an aircraft to be designed with a variable-pitch propeller, to give maximum thrust over a larger speed range. A fine pitch would be used during take-off and landing, whereas a coarser pitch is used for high-speed cruise flight. This is because the effective angle of attack of the propeller blade decreases as airspeed increases. To maintain the optimum effective angle of attack, the pitch must be increased. Blade pitch angle is not the same as blade angle of attack. As speed increases, blade pitch is increased to keep blade angle of attack constant.

A propeller blade's "lift", or its thrust, depends on the angle of attack combined with its speed. Because the velocity of a propeller blade varies from the hub to the tip, it is of twisted form in order for the thrust to remain approximately constant along the length of the blade; this is called "blade twist". This is typical of all but the crudest propellers.

=== Helicopters ===
In helicopters, pitch control changes the angle of incidence of the rotor blades, which in turn affects the blades' angle of attack. Main rotor pitch is controlled by both collective and cyclic, whereas tail rotor pitch is altered using pedals.

=== Feathering ===
Feathering the blades of a propeller means to increase their angle of pitch by turning the blades to be parallel to the airflow. This minimizes drag from a stopped propeller following an engine failure in flight.

=== Reverse thrust ===
Some propeller-driven aircraft permit the pitch to be decreased beyond the fine position until the propeller generates thrust in the reverse direction. This is called thrust reversal, and the propeller position is called the beta position.

== Wind turbines ==
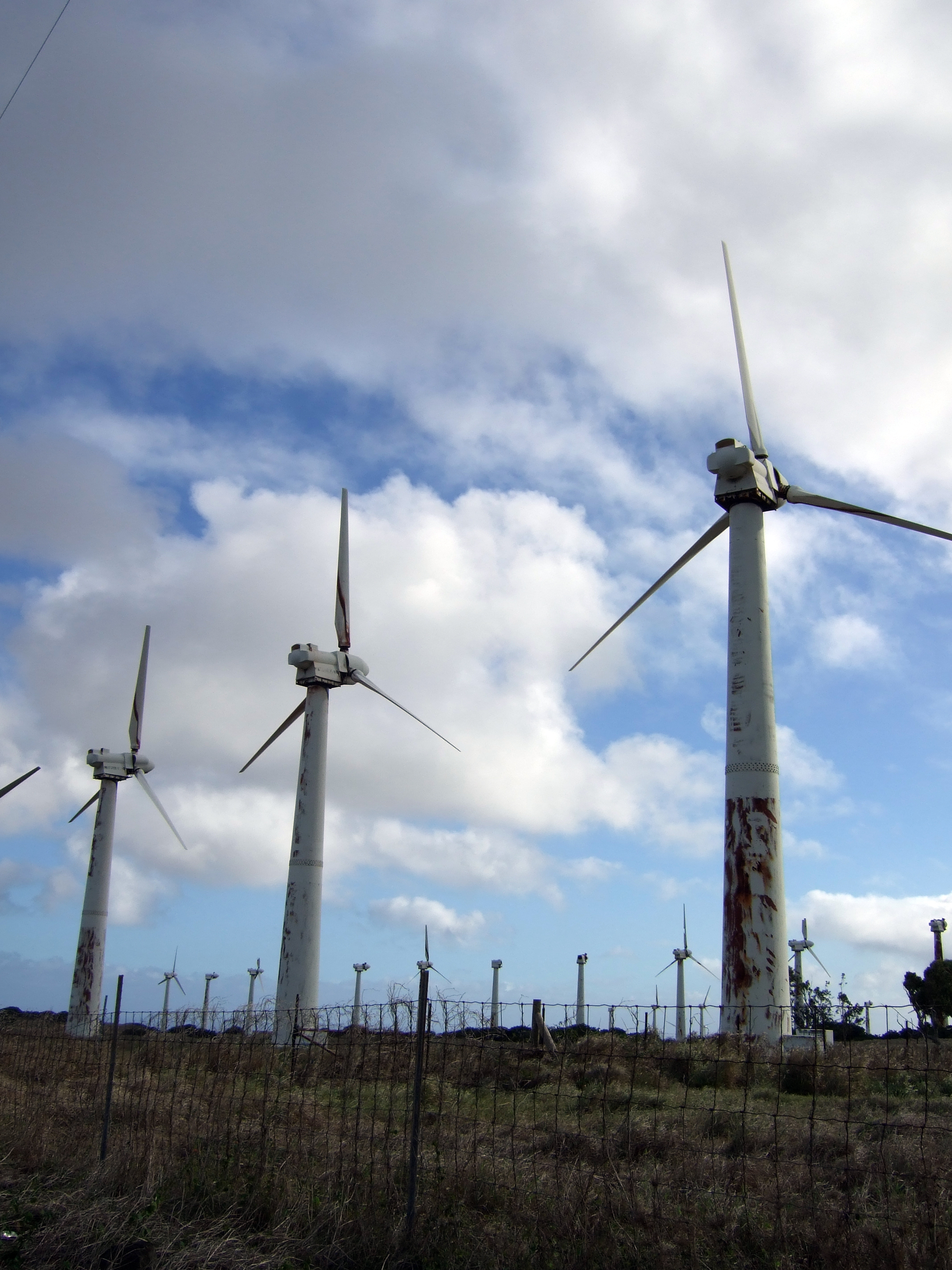
Decommissioned wind turbines of the Kama'oa Wind Farm in Ka Lae/South Point, Hawaii awaiting removal, with rotors stopped and blades feathered.

Blade pitch control is a feature of nearly all large modern horizontal-axis wind turbines. It is used to adjust the rotation speed and the generated power. While operating, a wind turbine's control system adjusts the blade pitch to keep the rotor speed within operating limits as the wind speed changes. Feathering the blades stops the rotor during emergency shutdowns, or whenever the wind speed exceeds the maximum rated speed. During construction and maintenance of wind turbines, the blades are usually feathered to reduce unwanted rotational torque in the event of wind gusts.

Blade pitch control is preferred over rotor brakes, as brakes are subject to failure or overload by the wind force on the turbine. This can lead to runaway turbines. By contrast, pitch control allows the blades to be feathered, so that wind speed does not affect the stress on the control mechanism.

Pitch control can be implemented via hydraulic or electric mechanisms. Hydraulic mechanisms have longer life, faster response time due to higher driving force, and a lower maintenance backup spring. However, hydraulics tend to require more power to keep the system at a high pressure, and can leak. Electric systems consume and waste less power, and do not leak. However, they require costly fail safe batteries and capacitors in the event of power failure.

Pitch control does not need to be active (reliant on actuators). Passive (stall-controlled) wind turbines rely on the fact that angle of attack increases with wind speed. Blades can be designed to stop functioning past a certain speed. This is another use for twisted blades: the twist allows for a gradual stall as each portion of the blade has a different angle of attack and will stop at a different time.

Blade pitch control typically accounts for less than 3% of a wind turbine's expense while blade pitch malfunctions account for 23% of all wind turbine production downtime, and account for 21% of all component failures.

== Shipping ==
In shipping, blade pitch is measured in the number of inches of forward propulsion through the water for one complete revolution of the propeller. For example, a propeller with a 12" pitch will propel the vessel 12" ahead when rotated once. Note that this is the theoretical maximum distance; in reality, due to "slip" between the propeller and the water, the actual distance propelled will invariably be less.

Some composite propellers have interchangeable blades, which enables the blade pitch to be changed when the propeller is stopped. A lower pitch would be used for transporting heavy loads at low speed, whereas a higher pitch would be used for high-speed travel.

== Rowing (sport) ==
In rowing, blade pitch is the inclination of the blade towards the stern of the boat during the drive phase of the rowing stroke. Without correct blade pitch, a blade would have a tendency to dive too deep, or pop out of the water and/or cause difficulties with balancing on the recovery phase of the stroke.
