= Naval Science and Technological Laboratory =

Indian defence laboratory

Naval Science & Technological Laboratory
- Motto: "Strength's Origin is in Science"
- Established: 20 August 1969
- Field of research: Underwater Weapons - Torpedoes
- Director: Dr Abraham Varughese
- Location: Vigyan Nagar, Visakhapatnam- 530 027, Visakhapatnam, Andhra Pradesh
- Operating agency: DRDO

The Naval Science and Technological Laboratory (NSTL) is an Indian defence laboratory of the Defence Research and Development Organisation (DRDO), located in Visakhapatnam. Its main function is the research and development of underwater weapons and associated systems. NSTL is organized under DRDO's Directorate of Naval R&D. The present director of NSTL is Dr. Abraham Varughese and Director General (DG) is Dr Y. Sreenivas Rao, Distinguished Scientist .

== History ==
NSTL was established on 20 August 1969 to undertake research and development of major naval systems and underwater weapons for the Indian Navy to make it self-reliant.

== Areas of work ==
NSTL is involved in the design, development, testing, evaluation and productionization of underwater weapons and their associated weapon control systems. These include torpedoes, mines, decoys, targets, simulators, Fire Control Systems and weapon launchers.

The lab is also involved in investigating hydrodynamic parameters and structural design of surface and submerged naval platforms and in evolving design criteria through model studies and simulation. NSTL is also involved in developing Warship Technologies, Stealth Technology for ships and Hydro-dynamic research services.

NSTL also develops specialized materials for Marine Applications, including materials for mitigation of Radar, IR, Magnetic, Acoustic and ELFE Signatures leading to stealthier platforms.

=== Facilities ===
NSTL is equipped with laboratories and Hydrodynamic research facilities including a High Speed Towing Tank (HSTT), a Cavitation Tunnel and a Wind Tunnel. They also have Acoustic, Shock, Noise and Vibration Test Facilities that are used to measure, study and analyze the mitigation of underwater noise generated by ships and submarines.

== Projects and Products ==
- Maareech ATDS
- Autonomous underwater vehicles
  - High Endurance Autonomous Underwater Vehicle
  - Man-portable Autonomous Underwater Vehicles (MP-AUVs)
- Torpedoes
  - Torpedo Advanced Light Shyena
  - Advanced Light Weight Torpedo
  - Varunastra HWT
  - Shakti Thermal Torpedo
  - Takshak Torpedo
- Multi-Influence Ground Mine (MIGM)
- Air Droppable Container (ADC-150)

== High Endurance Autonomous Underwater Vehicle (HEAUV) ==
DRDO's NSTL in partnership with the Cochin Shipyard is developing the HEAUV autonomous underwater vehicle. The HEAUV, first reported in 2024, is undergoing multiple trials. The vehicle has a weight of 6 short tons (5,400 kg), length of around 10 m (33 ft) and diameter of 1 m (3 ft 3 in). As for the performance, it has a maximum depth of 300 m (980 ft), endurance of 15 days at an economical speed of 3 kn (5.6 km/h) and a maximum speed of 8 kn (15 km/h). It can be mounted with swappable mission-specific payloads. The equipment include:–

- X band 360° surveillance radar for Intelligence, Surveillance and Reconnaissance (ISR) operations, developed by LRDE.
- 45 bar (4,500 kPa)-rated mast mounted radome to house collision avoidance radar.
- Communication systems (including acoustic, UHF, C band, SATCOM).
- Front and flank array sonars as primary underwater sensors, side-scan sonars for mine countermeasure (MCM) operations developed by NPOL.
- Array of batteries for propulsion system which includes electric motors connected to composite propellers.
- Capsule-based hydrogen fuel cell power plant (under development by NMRL.

In the first week of March 2024, the maiden surface trials of the HEAUV was conducted by DRDO and CSL at the International Ship Repair Facility (ISRF) Jetty in Kochi. All the system parameters were met during the trials.

In late March 2025, DRDO conducted Lake Trials of the HEAUV during which vehicle dynamics, in both submerged and surfaced conditions, was tested successfully along with its Sonar and Communications suite.

In 2018, the Ministry of Defence had released a Request for Information (RFI) for the acquisition of eight HEAUVs for Indian Navy's ASW, ISR and MCM operations as well as bathymetric and oceanographic data gathering. Further, an Expression of Interest (EoI) was released to invite Indian companies to develop an HEAUV for just ASW operations. As of now, GRSE is also developing HEAUV-ASW expected to completed by 2027 along with its Neerakshi AUV. Mazagon Dock Shipbuilders also released an EoI for HEAUV-ASW development in 2023.

== Man-Portable Autonomous Underwater Vehicles (MP-AUVs) ==
NSTL has developed a generation of Man-Portable Autonomous Underwater Vehicles (MP-AUVs) for mine countermeasure operations equipped with side-scan sonars and underwater cameras. They will be tasked to detect and classify mine-like objects with assistance from deep learning based target recognition. Additionally, the AUVs employ underwater acoustic communication for inter-AUV data exchange. The field trials was completed at NSTL Harbour in November 2025.

== Multi-Influence Ground Mine (MIGM) ==
Multi-Influence Ground Mine (MIGM) is a tactical naval mine developed for the Indian Navy by NSTL in collaboration with HEMRL and TBRL as well as Bharat Dynamics Limited and Apollo Microsystems Limited as the production agency. The system is designed to counter stealth surface ships and submarines by detecting their various influences such as acoustic, magnetic and pressure signatures. On 5 May 2025, DRDO successfully undertook the combat firing (with reduced explosive) of the mine. The Defence Acquisition Council (DAC) of India's Defence Ministry cleared multiple procurement projects including that of MIGM for the Indian Navy on 3 July 2026.

== Air Droppable Container (ADC-150) ==
The NSTL has developed the Air Droppable Container (ADC) 150 to enhance naval logistics. The container has a capacity of 150 kg (330 lb) and is meant to supply critical stores/equipment, medical assistance and others to distressed ships at blue sea, day from the coasts. While the NSTL was the nodal agency for the development programme, the Aerial Delivery Research and Development Establishment (ADRDE) developed the parachute system, the Defence Research and Development Laboratory (DRDL) provided instrument support for trials and the Centre for Military Airworthiness and Certification (CEMILAC) was involved for the flight clearance & certification.

The ADC-150 was developed in a short timeframe to meet the Indian Navy requirements. The system has been tested four times between 21 February and 1 March 2026 by the Navy and DRDO through a range of extreme conditions. The flight trials were carried out off the coast of Goa from a P-8I Neptune aircraft. The system is expected to be inducted soon after the tests were conducted successfully.

== See also ==
- DRDO
