= Varunastra (torpedo) =

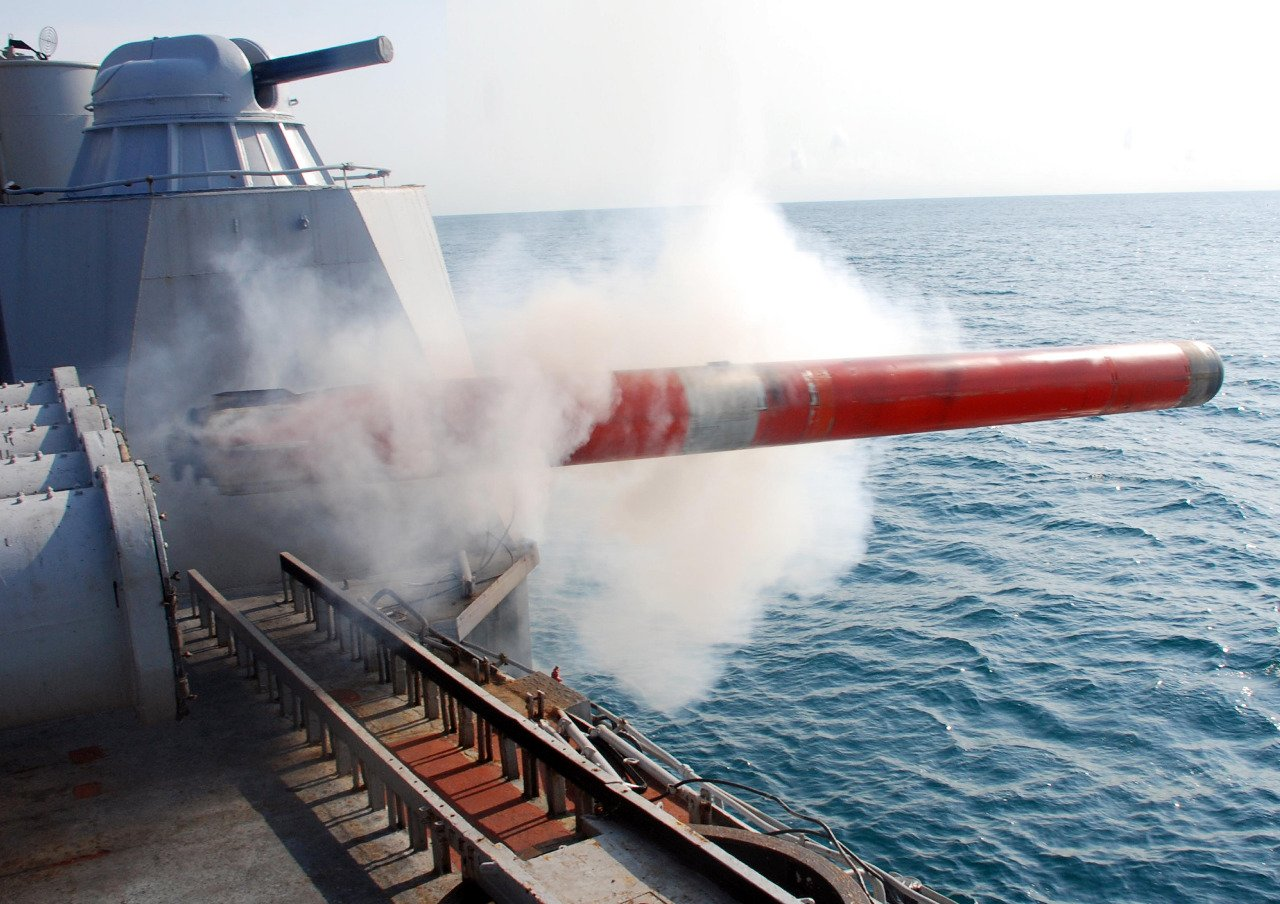
- Varunastra
- Type: Heavyweight anti-submarine torpedo
- Place of origin: India

Service history
- In service: 29 June 2016
- Used by: Indian Navy

Production history
- Designer: Naval Science and Technological Laboratory (DRDO)
- Manufacturer: Bharat Dynamics Limited
- Unit cost: ₹10 crore (US$1.0 million) - ₹12 crore (US$1.2 million)
- No. built: Unknown

Specifications
- Mass: 1,500 kg (3,300 lb)
- Length: 7.78 m (25.5 ft)
- Diameter: 533.4 mm (21.00 in)
- Warhead: High explosive
- Warhead weight: 250 kg (550 lb)
- Engine: Electric; Silver Oxide Zinc (AgOZn) batteries
- Operational range: 40 km (25 mi) to 50 km (31 mi)
- Maximum depth: 600 metres (2,000 ft)
- Maximum speed: 40 knots (74 km/h; 46 mph) to 50 knots (93 km/h; 58 mph)
- Guidance system: Fiber Optic Wire-guided, active-passive acoustic homing + multi-GNSS
- Launch platform: Ship; Submarine

The Varunastra (lit. 'Astra (weapon) of Varuna') is an Indian advanced autonomous heavyweight anti-submarine torpedo, developed by the Naval Science and Technological Laboratory (NSTL) of the Defence Research and Development Organisation (DRDO) for the Indian Navy. It is named after a legendary weapon created by the Hindu god of the oceans, Varuna.

== Design ==
This torpedo is powered by an electric propulsion system with multiple 250 kW (340 hp) Silver Oxide-Zinc (AgOZn) batteries. It can achieve speeds in excess of 40 kn (74 km/h; 46 mph), weighs around 1.5 tonnes and can carry 250 kg (550 lb) of conventional warhead. This torpedo has more than 95 per cent indigenous content. Varunastra has conformal array transducer which enables it look at wider angles than most common torpedoes. It also has an advanced autonomous guidance algorithms with low drift navigational aids, insensitive warhead which can operate in various combat scenarios. It is the only torpedo in the world to have a GPS-based locating aid. The exercise variant of Varunastra has integrated instrumentation system for recording all the dynamic parameters of the weapon, redundancy in recovery aids in case of emergency shut down or malfunction.

== Development ==
In May 2014 it was reported that the Indian Navy is scheduled to carry out User Evaluation Trials (UETs) during the mid-year period. The assembly of the prototype was done by a team from Bharat Dynamics Limited at the Talwar facility of NSTL in Visakhapatnam.

In the financial year 2015-16, the torpedo underwent 130 technical trials while 14 user trials were conducted between January and March 2015. In September 2015, MoD granted final approval for the torpedo's User Evaluation Trials (UETs) and eventually it was accepted for induction into Services.

The development of the first variant — ship-launched, anti-submarine variant — of the torpedo was completed in July 2016. The overall development period was 11 years.

The variant of Varunastra torpedo was formally inducted in the Indian Navy by defence minister Manohar Parrikar on 26 June 2016. The minister in his speech said that the Government is in favour of exporting the torpedo to friendly nations including Vietnam. With some minor modifications the submarine variant of the torpedo is to be test fired shortly.

During Aero India 2017, it was reported that DRDO has begun test-firing of a submarine-launched variant of the torpedo. A Sindhughosh-class submarine is being used as the launch platform for the development. The variant was reportedly accepted and ready for production.

On 5 June 2023, Varunastra was fired by a Kamorta-class corvette at an Under Water Target System (UWTS) laid by INS Jalashwa. This was the first trial where the torpedo was equipped with High Explosive (HE) live warhead. On 6 June, the Navy successfully conducted a combat trial of Varunastra where the torpedo was fired from a submarine and successfully hit an underwater target.

In September 2024, Apollo Micro Systems Limited received an order for Software Defined Universal Homing System for the Heavy Weight Torpedo from Bharat Dynamics Limited.

=== Production ===
- 30 June 2016: Reports suggested that Varunastra would be manufactured by Bharat Dynamics Limited (BDL) in association with the Naval Science and Technological Laboratory (NSTL).
- 4 July 2016: Order for the first batch of 73 torpedoes at a cost of ₹8,760 crore (equivalent to ₹140 billion or US$1.4 billion in 2026) was placed. The technology was formally handed over to BDL for production. The torpedo will have an indigenous content of 95%. The torpedo was also inducted by the Navy. All future anti-submarine warfare ships will be capable of firing Varunastra.
- 11 April 2018: BDL signed a Licensing Agreement for Transfer of Technology with NSTL for the production, testing and maintenance of Varunastra torpedoes.
- 14 June 2019: Ministry of Defence awarded a contract worth ₹1,187 crore (equivalent to ₹16 billion or US$170 million in 2026) to BDL to supply 63 Varunastra torpedoes to the Indian Navy.
- February 2020: Reports suggested that first batch of torpedoes from second order would be delivered soon.
- 20 March 2025: Defence Acquisition Council (DAC) cleared the Acceptance of Necessity for an additional batch of ship-launched variant of Varunastra Torpedo (Combat).
- 15 October 2026: The Ministry of Defence signed the contract worth ₹1,543 crore (US$160 million) with BDL for an unknown quantity of ship-launched, anti-submarine Varunastra Heavy Weight Torpedoes.

== Further development ==
=== Thermal Heavy Weight Torpedo Shakti ===
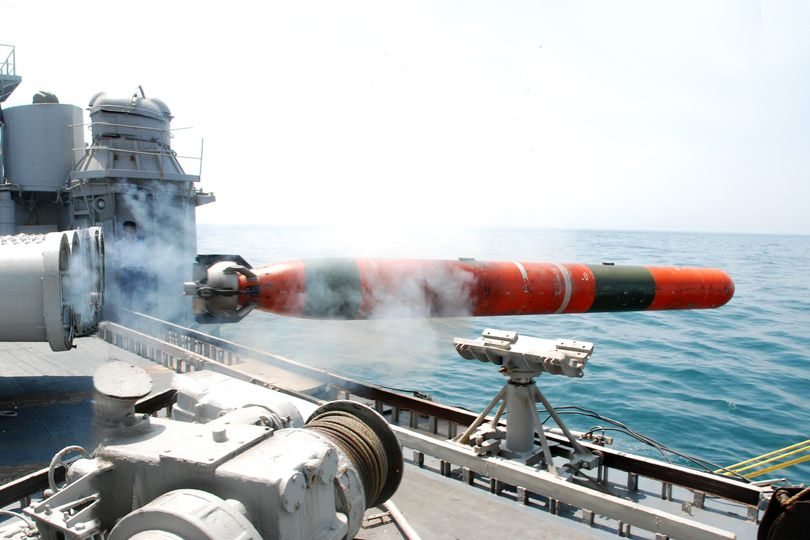
Shakti Thermal Torpedo

Shakti heavyweight torpedo uses thermal propulsion technology in contrast to the Varunastra torpedo which uses electric propulsion. The torpedo employs monopropellant fuel, which allows combustion to take place without aerial oxygen, and a pumpjet. Its propulsion unit generates 400 kW of power for faster acceleration. A newer propulsion unit is under development which will be producing 500 kW of power .It can operate at a maximum depth of 600 metres (2,000 ft), a maximum speed of 60 knots (110 km/h; 69 mph). The first image emerged publicly in Twitter on 9 June 2023 which hinted that the torpedo is undergoing sea trials. The Torpedo is expected to be used on India's P-77 and S5 class submarines, as well as older Sindhugosh class.

=== Electronic Heavy Weight Torpedo Takshak ===
Takshak torpedo is the advanced version of the Varunastra torpedo which employs an electric battery for propulsion. It has a length of 6.4 metres (21 ft) which is shorter from the previous variant, enabling to be launched from submarines. The torpedo had a range of 40 km (25 mi) and maximum depth of 400 m (1,300 ft). Takshak uses a “swim-out” launch system, which launches torpedoes without compressed air and minimises acoustic signature during launch. It also features ring laser gyro inertial navigation system (RLG INS) as well as GPS/NavIC-based guidance. Takshak has 2 variants: submarine-launched with optical fiber guidance and ship-launched with autonomous guidance. By May 2024, the torpedo was ready for sea trials with the Indian Navy which would pave way for its induction and deployment.

On 30 December 2024, the Indian Ministry of Defence (MoD) signed a contract, worth ₹877 crore (equivalent to ₹934 crore or US$97 million in 2026), with the French Naval Group to integrate DRDO developed Electronic Heavy Weight Torpedo Takshak (EHWT) on Kalvari-class submarines. The guidance software of the torpedo will be integrated with the Submarine Tactical Integrated Combat System (SUBTICS) of the Kalvari submarines.

The torpedo trials from the class of submarines is expected before the end of 2026, as of April 2026. The trial campaign will begin with dry and wet trials in harbour to ensure that the torpedo can be launched without damage to the submarine's sensors and external surface. If successful, it will be followed by trials using live warheads by 2027 on decommissioned ships or underwater targets.

A Wire Guided Heavy Weight Torpedo (WGHWT) is also under development with the DRDO as of 2026. It is a submarine launched torpedo with high speeds. WGHWT and EHWT could be different designations for the same design. The first production grade was delivered by BDL from its Hyderabad facility to NSTL's Visakhapatnam unit on 25 April 2026.

== Operators ==
India

- Indian Navy – System was inducted in 2016. Total 136 torpedoes ordered in two batches.
  - Visakhapatnam-class destroyer
  - Kolkata-class destroyer
  - Delhi-class destroyer
  - Nilgiri-class frigate
  - Talwar-class frigate
  - Kamorta-class corvette
  - Sindhughosh-class submarine

=== Possible operators ===
- Vietnam - In 2016 India offered to export versions of the Varunastra to Vietnam.

== Gallery ==
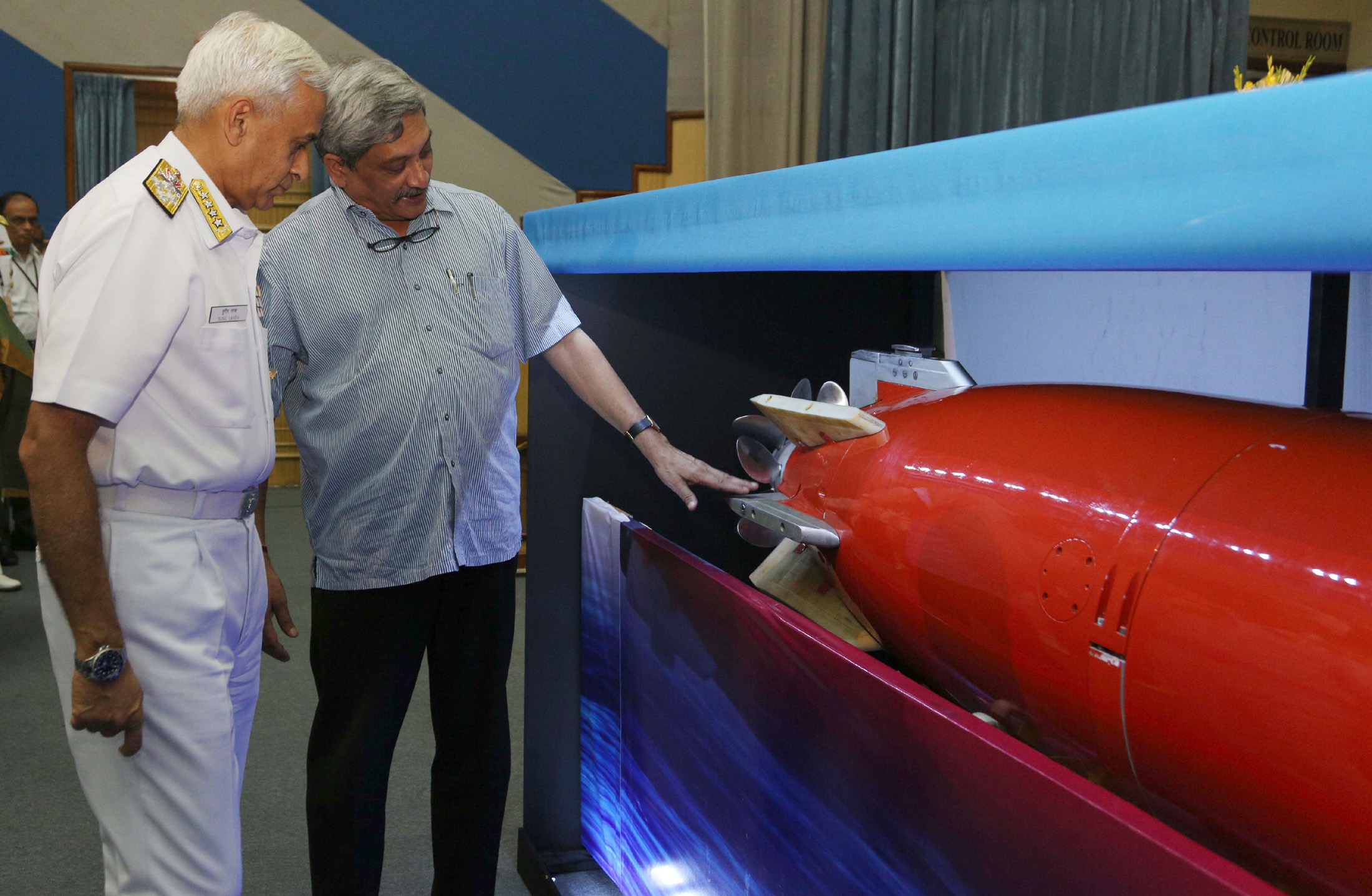
Admiral Sunil Lanba and Manohar Parrikar taking a close look at the Varunastra, during its handing off ceremony to the Indian Navy

Varunastra heavy torpedo engaging an underwater target.

== See also ==
- Torpedo Advanced Light Shyena
- Mark 48 torpedo – American heavyweight submarine-launched torpedoes
