= Double-double laminates =

Double–double (DD) laminates, or DD laminates, are a class of composite laminates composed of repeated four-ply sub-laminates arranged in the form [±Φ/±Ψ], where the ply orientations are defined by two continuous angle parameters, Φ and Ψ. Unlike conventional composite laminates that employ a limited set of discrete ply angles, DD laminates use continuous variation of ply orientation. The concept is employed in structural engineering applications involving composite materials.

== Mechanical behavior ==
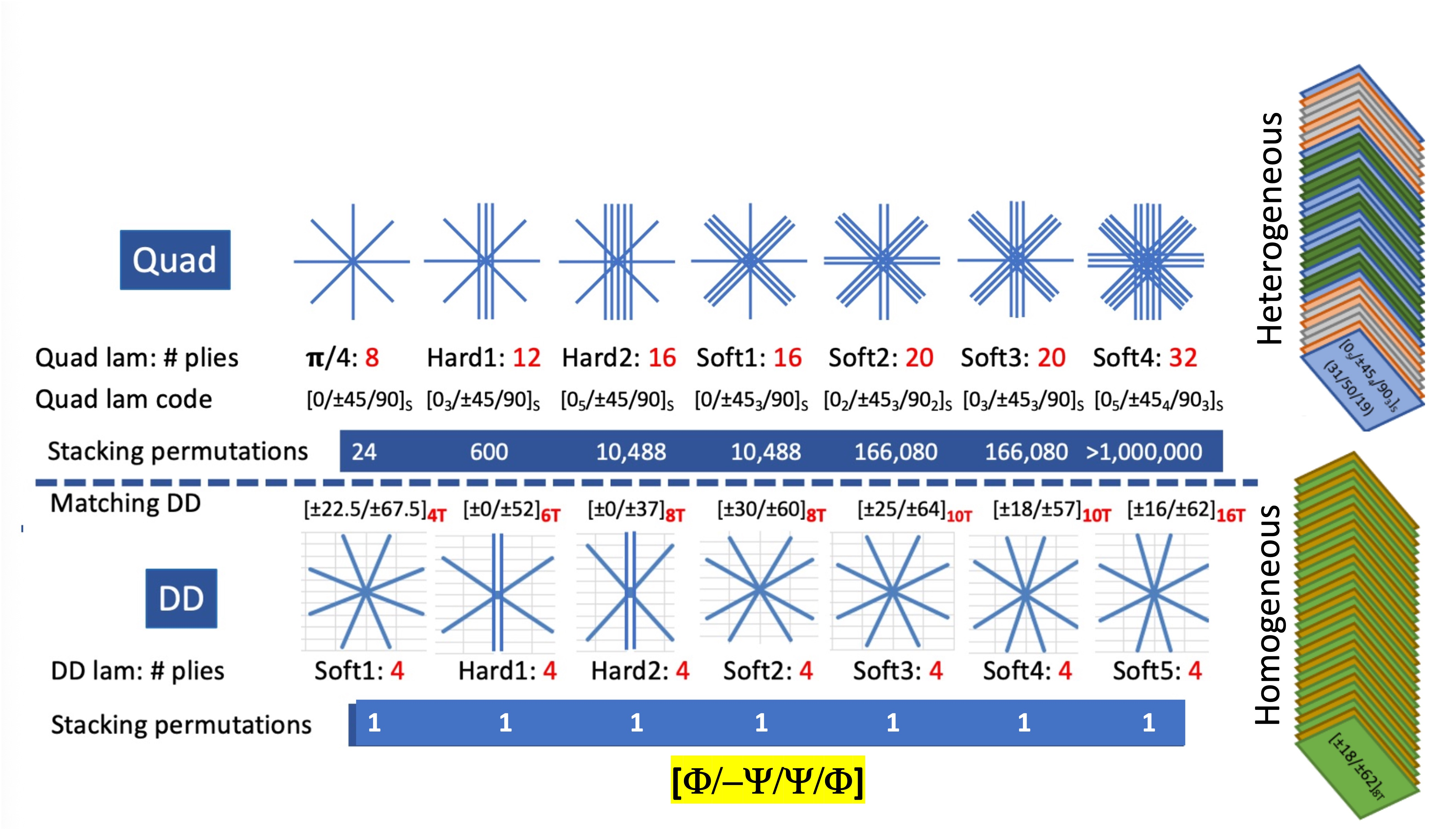
Relative stacking of quadriaxial vs. double-double laminates.

Studies have reported that, when DD laminates are manufactured using thin plies and a sufficiently large number of repeated sub-laminates, the laminate response can be approximated as homogenized. Under these conditions, the overall mechanical behavior has been described as similar to that of a symmetric laminate, even though the stacking sequence is not explicitly symmetric. A characteristic feature of this homogenization is the reduction of bending–stretching coupling effects, such that the corresponding terms in the ([B]) stiffness matrix become negligible.

== Applications and manufacturing considerations ==
DD laminates have been discussed in the literature in the context of lightweight structural applications, particularly where changes in laminate thickness are required. Under homogenized conditions, tapering has been reported to be implemented on a ply-by-ply basis using single-ply drops, without the requirement to maintain mid-plane symmetry. In addition, the use of continuous ply-angle parameters has been presented as allowing a broader range of stiffness tailoring compared with conventional quadriaxial laminates, which typically rely on standard ply orientations of 0°, ±45°, and 90°. DD laminates are typically described as being manufactured by stacking of repeated four-ply sub-laminates, following the prescribed angle parameters.
