= Lay-up process =

Moulding process for composite materials

A lay-up process is a moulding process for composite materials, in which the final product is obtained by overlapping a specific number of different layers, usually made of continuous polymeric or ceramic fibres and a thermoset polymeric liquid matrix. It can be divided into dry lay-up and wet lay-up, depending on whether the layers are pre-impregnated or not. Dry lay-up is a common process in the aerospace industry, as it is possible to obtain complex shapes with good mechanical properties, characteristics required in this field. This is because a wet lay-up cannot be performed with uni-directional fabrics, which have better mechanical properties, so it is mainly used in other areas which have lower performance requirements.

The main stages of the lay-up process are cutting, lamination and polymerization. Even though some of the production steps can be automated, this process is mainly manual (hence often referred to as the hand lay-up process), leading to laminates with high production costs and low production rates with respect to other techniques. Hence, nowadays, it is mainly suitable for small series production runs of 10 to 1000 parts.

== Cutting ==
Cutting fabrics is the first stage of the lay-up process. While the fibres, in general, have high tensile strength, the shear strength is usually quite low, so they are fairly easy to cut. This process can be manual, semi-automatic or completely automatic.

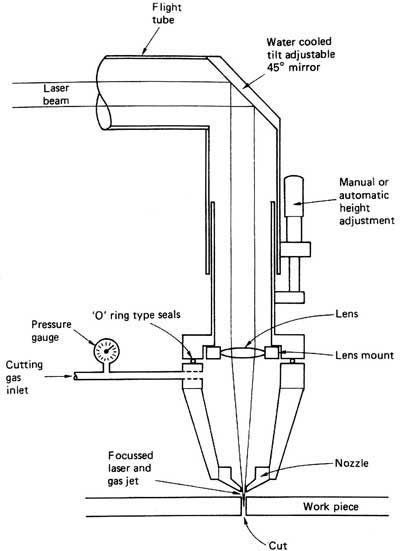
Laser cutter.

Water jet cutter. #1: high-pressure water inlet. #2: jewel. #3: abrasive. #4: mixing tube. #5: guard. #6: cutting water jet. #7: cut material

The most common cutting tools are scissors, knives, saws and specialised cutting tools. Die-cutting systems offer a more automated alternative, allowing higher production rates at lower costs, since they can operate faster and on several layers of material at once. These methods provide different finish precisions, but they all are mechanical procedures and have one major disadvantage in common: the physical contact between the cutting tool and the fibers. An alternative process with less friction is the ultrasound method, which consists of cutting the fabrics with a blade actuated by high-frequency mechanical vibrations, produced by an internal source integrated into the system. There are also completely contact-free cutting techniques, mainly using laser and water jet cutting, both of which are performed using CNC machines. Both of these methods share a common disadvantage in that they create high-temperature areas along the cut axes, which can significantly alter the physical characteristics of the material.

The nesting layout is a, which is the arrangement of the different shapes to be cut from the fabric in order to reduce the scraps. The patterns are generally created digitally and, when possible, cut on a CNC machine or, otherwise, replicated by hand.

== Lamination ==
Lamination of the fabrics is the second stage of the lay-up process. It is the procedure of overlapping all the layers in the correct order and with the correct orientation. In the case of wet lay-up, the preparation of the resin is included in this operation, as the fabrics are not already impregnated. For particularly high quality products, lamination is performed in a clean-room to avoid particle inclusions within the layers, which could interfere with the characteristics of the final product.

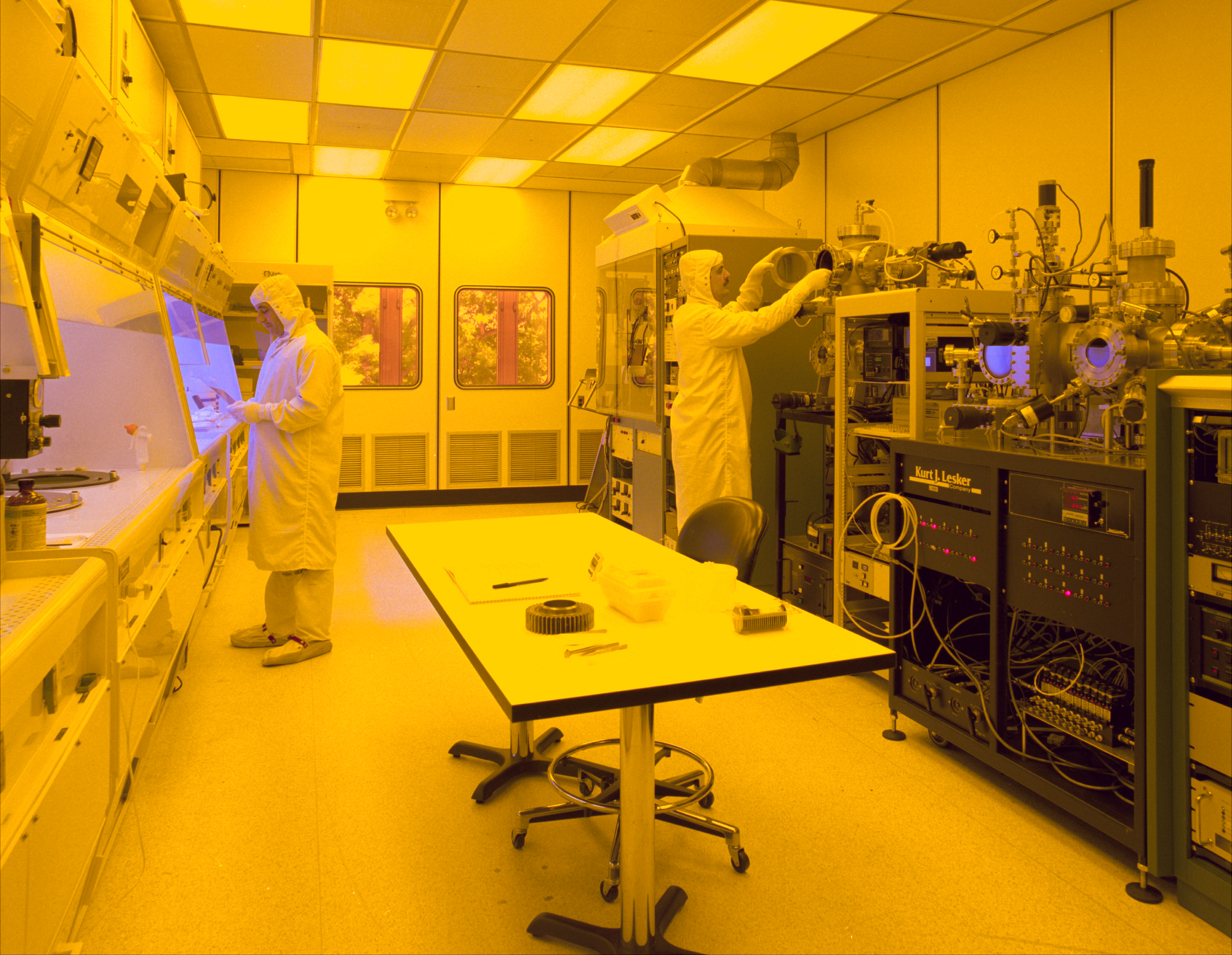
Cleanroom used for the production of microsystems.

The most important tool is the mould, which can be male or female depending on the application. It can be made of different materials, depending on the shrinkage and the thermal expansion coefficient of the composite material, the stiffness required, the surface finish needed, the draft angles and the bending angle. Furthermore, the mould must be stable at the lamination temperature, bear the operative pressure, be resistant to wear, be compatible with the other tools used, be resistant to washing solvents and it must be easy to apply release agents.

The first step of lamination is to apply a release agent on the mould, fundamental to avoid adhesion between the resin and the mould itself. If needed for surface finish, a layer of peel-ply may be added. Peel-plies are nylon films used to obtain a specific roughness of the surface on which they are applied, to protect them during storage and to trap volatile particles during polymerization. All the fabric layers are then overlapped following the instructions on the ply-book, which contains a list of all the operations to be performed during this process. Usually, intermediate compacting is performed every 4 or 5 layers, in order to let the air evacuate and to obtain a final product with better mechanical characteristics.

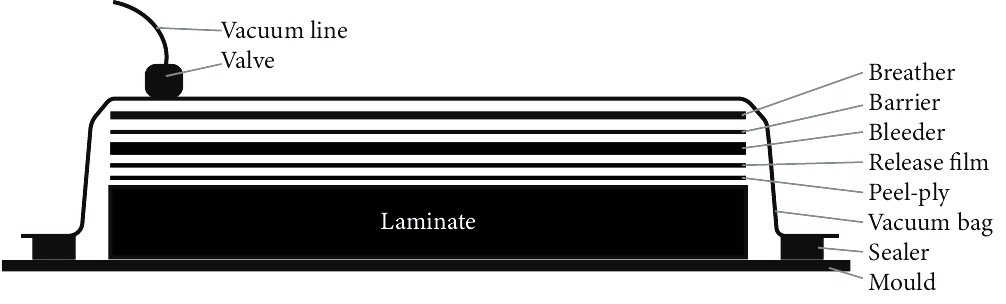
Vacuum bag.

After all the fabric layers have been put in the right position, another layer of peel-ply is applied on top, with the same purpose as the first one. A sequence of other layers is added above it: the release film, which separates the laminate from the other layers but still allows the excess resin to pass through; the bleeder, whose main function is to absorb the excess resin; a barrier, to separate the bleeder from the breather; the breather, to distribute the vacuum homogeneously across the external surfaces and to avoid any folds of the vacuum bag being transferred to the laminate surface; the vacuum bag, a flexible polymeric film, typically made of nylon, able to maintain the vacuum created with a vacuum pump. Further important elements are the valves and the sealant used to seal the vacuum bag to prevent air leaks.

This process can be manual, semi-automatic or completely automatic. When done entirely by hand, lamination is a long and difficult process (due to the strict tolerances required). An alternative is a semi-automatic - also called "mechanically assisted" - process, consisting of a machine which handles the layers, which are then applied on the mould by an operator. It is completely automatic if a machine, such as an automatic tape laying machine, can also place the layers in the right position and orientation. These automatic methods allow high production rates to be reached.

== Polymerization ==
Polymerization of the laminate is the third and final stage of the lay-up process. This phase is of utmost importance to obtain the required characteristics of the final product.

=== Polymerization in autoclave and industrial oven ===
This process can be done at room temperature with just a vacuum pump, to control vacuum, with the aid of an industrial oven connected to a vacuum pump, to control temperature and vacuum, or with an autoclave, to control temperature, vacuum and also hydrostatic pressure.

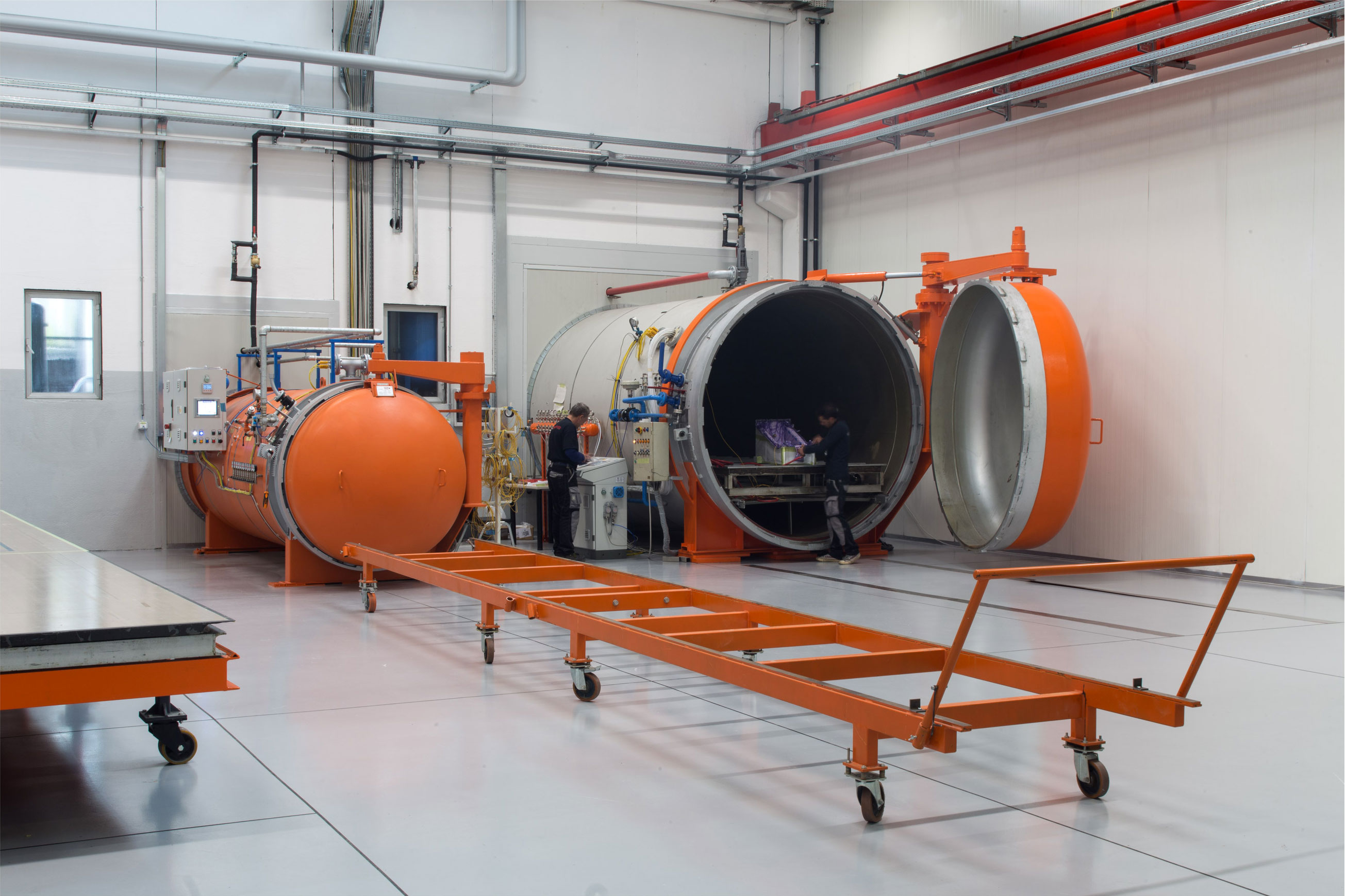
Persico Marine's autoclave.

Polymerization in an autoclave is a technique which allows laminates with the best mechanical properties to be obtained, but it is the most expensive and permits only the use of open moulds. The advantage is due to the fact that the pressure helps to bond the composite layers and to eject air inclusions and volatile products, increasing the quality of the process. Each combination of fabric and resin has its own optimal polymerization cycles, dependent on the wettability of the fibres and resin properties, like viscosity and gel point. Typically, the three cycles of temperature, pressure and vacuum are studied experimentally to obtain the best combination of the three parameters. Polymerization in an industrial oven is similar but without pressure control. It is less expensive and therefore used for all those laminates which do not need to have the very highest mechanical strength and stiffness properties. Moreover, as industrial ovens are, in general, bigger than autoclaves, they are used for components with non-standard dimensions.

=== Polymerization with matched-die moulding ===
Polymerization with matched-die moulding is used for plane or simple-geometry laminates and can include a vacuum pump and an electric or hydraulic heat source. It is made of a press with male and female moulds that close to form a gap with the shape of the component, the width of which is regulated to control the thickness of the part. The press can not apply hydrostatic pressure as in an autoclave, but only a vertical one. Matched-die moulding allows a very high degree of dimensional control, a good surface finish on both surfaces, and reasonable production rates but, on the other hand, it may allow fibre misalignment and it is very expensive.

== Problems ==
As Meola et al. pointed out in Infrared thermography in the evaluation of aerospace composite materials, "Several different types of defects may occur during the fabrication of composites, the most common being fibre/play misalignment, broken fibres, resin cracks or transversal ply cracks, voids, porosity, slag inclusions, nonuniform fibre/resin volume ratio, disbonded interlaminar regions, kissing bonds, incorrect cure and mechanical damage around machined holes and/or cuts."

Also, three main problems related to cutting polymerized composite materials must be considered. The first is that reinforcement fibers are abrasive, hence traditional cutting tools are not suitable, as their lives would be very short and their blunt edges would damage the materials. The second is that composite materials have low thermal conductivity, which can cause heat accumulations and deformations. The last is that composite materials tend to delaminate when cut, therefore it is necessary to consider this when choosing a cutting method.
