= Composite propeller =

Type of ship's propeller

Marine composite propellers are ship propellers made from fiber composites. These composites are made from materials like glass or carbon fibers and infused with a high-strength resin like epoxy or polyimide.

== Attributes ==
Composite propellers can be made using a lay-up process, leading to anisotropic properties. This can create a passive adaptation of self-twisting propeller blades, which are considered more energy-efficient when compared to rigid propeller blades.

== Longevity ==
Composite materials may be considered an environmentally friendly option for propeller blades in some applications. While the composite blades are more resistant to corrosion and impact damage than many metal-alloy propeller blades, the water saturation and the propeller application decrease the longevity of composite propellers.
