= Amine value =

Measure of an organic compound's nitrogen content

In organic chemistry, amine value is a measure of the nitrogen content of an organic molecule. Specifically, it is usually used to measure the amine content of amine functional compounds. It may be defined as the number of milligrams of potassium hydroxide (KOH) needed to neutralize all amine groups in 1g sample

== List of ASTM methods ==
There are a number of ASTM analytical test methods to determine amine value. A number of states in the United States have adopted their own test methods but they are based on ASTM methods. Although there are similarities with the method it is not the same as an acid value.

- ASTM D2073 - This is a potentiometric method.
- ASTM D2074-07
- ASTM D2896 - potentiometric method with perchloric acid.
- ASTM D6979-03

== First principles ==
The amine value is useful in helping determine the correct stoichiometry of a two component amine cure epoxy resin system.

It is the number of Nitrogens x 56.1 (Mwt of KOH) x 1000 (convert to milligrams) divided by molecular mass of the amine functional compound. So using Tetraethylenepentamine (TEPA) as an example: Mwt = 189, number of nitrogen atoms = 5

So 5 x 1000 x 56.1/189 = 1484. So the Amine Value of TEPA = 1484

=== Other amines ===
All numbers are in units of mg KOH/g.

- Ethylenediamine. Amine value = 1870
- Diethylenetriamine. Amine value = 1634
- Triethylenetetramine. Amine value = 1537
- Aminoethylpiperazine. Amine value = 1305
- Isophorone diamine. Amine value = 660
- Hexamethylenediamine. Amine value = 967
- 1,2-Diaminocyclohexane. Amine value = 984
- 1,3-BAC. Amine value = 790
- 2-Methylpentamethylenediamine -Dytek A. Amine value = 967
- m-Xylylenediamine -MXDA. Amine value = 825

== See also-related test methods ==
- Acid value
- Bromine number
- Epoxy value
- Hydroxyl value
- Iodine value
- Peroxide value
- Saponification value
