= Pongamia oil =

Vegetable oil

Pongamia oil is derived from the seeds of the Millettia pinnata tree, which is native to tropical and temperate Asia. Millettia pinnata, also known as Pongamia pinnata or Pongamia glabra, is common throughout Asia and thus has many different names in different languages, many of which have come to be used in English to describe the seed oil derived from M. pinnata; Pongamia is often used as the generic name for the tree and is derived from the genus the tree was originally placed in. Other names for this oil include honge oil, kanuga oil, karanja oil, and pungai oil.

== Cultivation ==
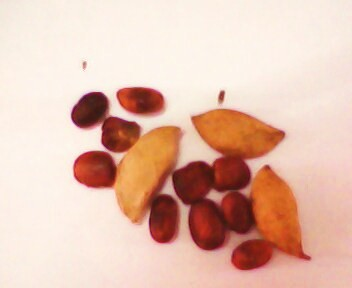
Pods and seeds of Millettia pinnata

Millettia pinnata is native to South and Southeast Asia. Typically, the plant starts yielding pods from the fifth year on with the yields increasing each year until it stabilizes around the tenth year. Seeds are usually harvested in the spring, each seed weighing from about 1.1 grams (0.039 oz) to 1.8 grams (0.063 oz). The yield per tree can range from about 10 kilograms (22 lb) to more than 50 kilograms (110 lb) depending on conditions, with an average of 1500-1700 seeds per kilogram. Historically, the pods are removed from the trees by beating the branches with sticks and decorticated using mallets or stones. Research is ongoing into mechanical harvesting methods.

The basic nutritional components of Millettia pinnata seeds may change depending on the season and maturity of the tree (table).

Component	Percentage
Oil	27% - 39%
Protein	17% - 37%
Starch	6% - 7%
Crude fiber	5% - 7%
Moisture	15% - 20%
Ash	2% - 3%

== Description ==
Pongamia oil is extracted from the seeds by expeller pressing, cold pressing, or solvent extraction. The oil is yellowish-orange to brown in color. It has a high content of triglycerides, and its disagreeable taste and odor are due to bitter flavonoid constituents including karanjin, pongamol, tannin and karanjachromene.

Millettia pinnata has a number of different varieties but little research has been published on the differences between them. This combined with variances in soil and weather can change the specific composition of pongamia oil. Pongamia oil is composed of the following fatty acids:

Fatty acid	Nomenclature	Percentage
Palmitic	C16:0	3.7% – 7.9%
Stearic	C18:0	2.4% – 8.9%
Oleic	C18:1	44.5% – 71.3%
Linoleic	C18:2	10.8% – 18.3%
Linolenic	C18:3	2.6%
Arachidic	C20:0	2.2% – 4.7%
Eicosenoic	C20:1	9.5% – 12.4%
Behenic	C22:0	4.2% – 5.3%
Lignoceric	C24:0	1.1% – 3.5%

The physical properties of crude pongamia oil are as follows:

Property	Unit	Value
Acid value	mg KOH/g	4.0 - 12
Calorific value	kcal/kg	8742
Cetane number		42
Density	g/cm^{3}	0.924
Iodine value	g/100 g	86.5 - 87
Saponification value	mg KOH/g	184 - 187
Specific gravity		0.925
Unsaponifiable matter	% w/w	2.6 - 2.9
Viscosity	mm^{2}/sec	40.2
Boiling point	°C	316
Cloud point	°C	3.5
Fire Point	°C	230
Flash point	°C	225
Pour point	°C	-3.0

== Uses ==
=== Traditional ===
It has been used as lamp oil, in leather tanning, in soap making, and as a lubricant for thousands of years. Its toxicity, as well as its color, bitter taste, and disagreeable odour, keep it from being used in cooking, but it does have uses in traditional medicine for treating skin disease and liver disease.

It is used as a fish poison, as the metabolites karanjin and pongamol are both toxic to fish.

=== Biodiesel ===
Many studies have been done to convert pongamia oil into biodiesel. The following table shows the physical properties of the methyl esters of pongamia oil versus the ASTM D6751 and EN 14214 biodiesel standards:

Property	Unit	Methyl esters	ASTM D6751	EN 14214
Acid value	mg KOH/g	0.46 - 0.5	<0.8	<0.5
Caloric value	kcal/kg	3700		
Cetane Number		41.7 - 56	>45	>51
Density at 15 °C	g/cm^{3}	0.86 - 0.88	0.87 - 0.89	0.86 - 0.90
Viscosity at 40 °C	mm^{2}/s	4.77	1.9 - 6.0	3.5 - 5.0
Iodine value	g/100 g	86.5 - 91		<120
Oxidation Stability at 110 °C	h	2.24		>6
Saponification value	mg KOH/g	184 - 187		
Unsaponifiable matter	% w/w	2.6 - 2.9		
Boiling point	°C	316		
Cloud point	°C	19		0/-15 †
Fire Point	°C	230		
Flash point	°C	174	>130	>101
Pour point	°C	15		
† This is not a property of the EN 14214 standard; it is country specific standard for summer/winter seasons.

The comparison of the methyl esters of pongamia oil to the ASTM D6751 standard for biodiesel fuels shows that processed pongamia oil is within the standards. Research has shown that jatropha or pongamia oil can be mixed with palm oil to achieve an improved low-temperature viscosity than pure palm oil and a higher oxidation stability than pure jatropha or pongamia oil. In addition, the methyl esters of pongamia oil have a cloud point of 19 °C, which is outside some country specific standards, and a pour point of 15 °C both of which would be problematic in lower temperature climates.

== See also ==
- Energy policy of India
- Jatropha oil
- Renewable energy
