= 4,4'-Diaminodicyclohexylmethane =

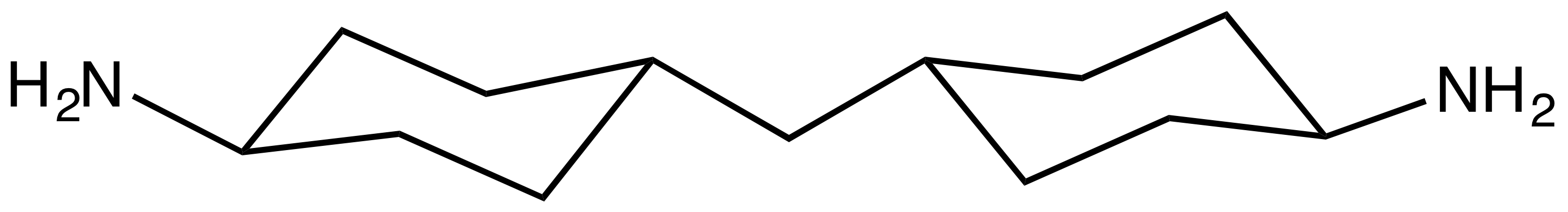

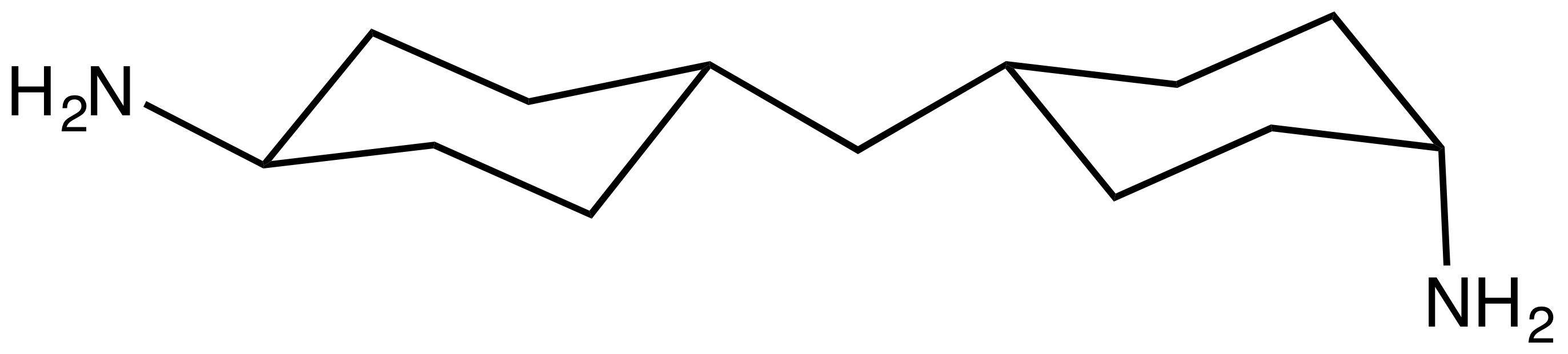

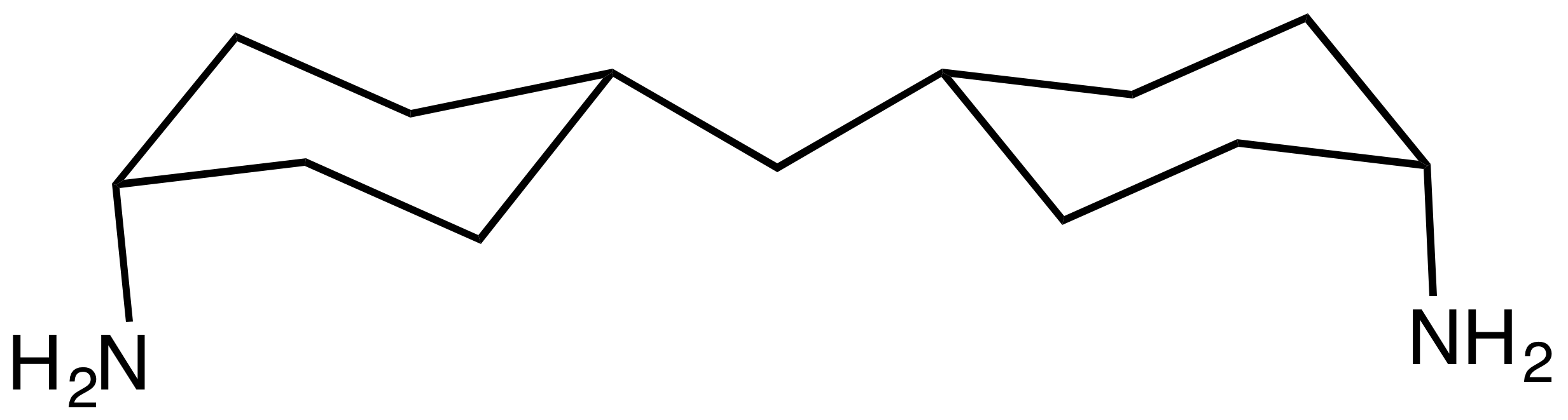

Names
- Preferred IUPAC name 4,4′-Methylenedi(cyclohexan-1-amine)
- Other names 4,4'-Methylenebis(cyclohexan-1-amine); Methylene bis(4,4'-cyclohexylamine); Bis(4-aminocyclohexyl)methane

Identifiers
CAS Number	1761-71-3 mixture of isomers; 6693-29-4 trans-trans isomer; 6693-30-7 trans-cis isomer; 6693-31-8 cis-cis isomer
3D model (JSmol)	Interactive image
ChemSpider	13868371
ECHA InfoCard	100.015.608
EC Number	217-168-8 (mixture), 229-737-8 (trans-trans), 229-738-3 (trans-cis), 229-739-9 (cis-cis)
PubChem CID	15660
UNII	0NW77H1O03; AR21XLU05L; B16001JGEW; H8V09V2RM3
CompTox Dashboard (EPA)	DTXSID0024921
- InChI: InChI=1S/C13H26N2/c14-12-5-1-10(2-6-12)9-11-3-7-13(15)8-4-11/h10-13H,1-9,14-15H2 Key: DZIHTWJGPDVSGE-UHFFFAOYSA-N
- SMILES: C1CC(CCC1CC2CCC(CC2)N)N

Properties
Chemical formula	C_{13}H_{26}N_{2}
Molar mass	210.365 g·mol^{−1}
Appearance	colorless solid
Melting point	60–65 °C (140–149 °F; 333–338 K)
Boiling point	330–331 °C (626–628 °F; 603–604 K)

Hazards
- GHS labelling
Pictograms	(GHS05: Corrosive) (GHS06: Toxic) (GHS07: Exclamation mark) (GHS08: Health hazard) (GHS09: Environmental hazard)
Signal word	Danger
Hazard statements	H302, H314, H317
Precautionary statements	P260, P264, P270, P271, P272, P273, P280, P284, P301+P312, P301+P330+P331, P302+P352, P303+P361+P353, P304+P340, P305+P351+P338, P310, P312, P314, P320, P321, P330, P333+P313, P363, P391, P403+P233, P405, P501
Flash point	153.5 °C (308.3 °F; 426.6 K)
- Except where otherwise noted, data are given for materials in their standard state (at 25 °C [77 °F], 100 kPa). Infobox references

4,4'-Diaminodicyclohexylmethane is the name for organic compounds with the formula CH_{2}(C_{6}H_{10}NH_{2})_{2}. It is classified as a diamine. In the epoxy industry it is often referred to as PACM, short for para-diaminodicyclohexylmethane. It is used as a curing agent for epoxy resins It finds particular use in epoxy flooring. Another use is to produce diisocyanates, which are precursors to polyurethanes. The mixture is a colorless solid, but typical samples are yellowish and oily. The compound is produced as a mixture of three isomers by the hydrogenation of methylenedianiline. These isomers are, in decreasing order of their yield from the hydrogenation, trans-trans, cis-trans, and a small amount of cis-cis.

== Uses ==
This diamine is mainly used to make epoxy resin curing agents for CASE (Coatings, Adhesives, Sealants, and Elastomers) applications especially flooring. Another application arises from its reaction with phosgene to produce a cycloaliphatic diisocyanate Hydrogenated MDI, which is used to produce light stable polyurethanes. The substance may also be used as a chemical intermediate to make other molecules.

4,4'-Diaminodicyclohexylmethane was used in producing a polyamide called Qiana, since discontinued. For this application, the condensation partner was dodecanoic acid.

== Safety ==
It is an alkaline skin irritant. At 300 – 1000 mg/kg (oral, rats), the LD_{50} is low. It does not exhibit mutagenic properties.

== See also ==
- 1,3-BAC
- DCH-99
- Epoxy
- IPDA
- MXDA
