= C12–C13 alcohol glycidyl ether =

- n = 10-11

Identifiers
CAS Number	120547-52-6
3D model (JSmol)	Interactive image
EC Number	271-846-8
- SMILES: CCCCCCCCCCCCCOCC1CO1.CCCCCCCCCCCCOCC1CO1
- Except where otherwise noted, data are given for materials in their standard state (at 25 °C [77 °F], 100 kPa). Infobox references

C12–C13 alcohol glycidyl ether is a mixture of organic chemicals in the glycidyl ether family. It is a mixture of mainly 12 and 13 carbon chain alcohols, also called fatty alcohols that have been glycidated. It is an industrial chemical used as a surfactant but primarily for epoxy resin viscosity reduction. It has the CAS number 120547-52-6.

== Manufacture ==
A fatty alcohol mixture rich in C12-C13 alcohols is placed in a reactor with a Lewis acid catalyst. Epichlorohydrin is then added slowly to control the exotherm. The reaction results in the formation of the halohydrins. This is followed by a caustic dehydrochlorination, to form C12–C13 alcohol glycidyl ether. The waste products are water, sodium chloride, and excess caustic soda. One of the quality control tests would involve measuring the Epoxy value by determination of the epoxy equivalent weight.

== Synonyms ==
The material has a number of synonyms.

- Oxirane, mono (C12-13-alkyloxy) methyl derivatives
- Alkyl(C12-C13) glycidyl ether
- Alkyl glycidyl ether
- Oxirane, Mono (C12-C13 alkoxymethyl) methyl derivatives
- (C12-C13)alkylglycidyl ether
- Oxirane, 2-[(C12-13-alkyloxy)methyl] derivatives

== Uses ==
As an epoxy modifier it is classed as an epoxy reactive diluent. It is one of a family of glycidyl ethers available used for viscosity reduction of epoxy resins. These are then further formulated into coatings, sealants, adhesives, and elastomers. Resins with this diluent tend to show improved workability. It is also used to synthesize other molecules. The use of the diluent does effect mechanical properties and microstructure of epoxy resins.

== Toxicology ==
The toxicology is fairly well known, and it is classed as a skin irritant.

== See also ==
- Epoxide
- Glycidol

== External websites ==
- Denacol epoxy diluent range
- Reactive Diluents – Olin Epoxy
- Hexion Epoxy Functional Modifiers
- Cargill Reactive diluents
