= Bromine number =

Mass of bromine absorbed by 100 grams of a given substance

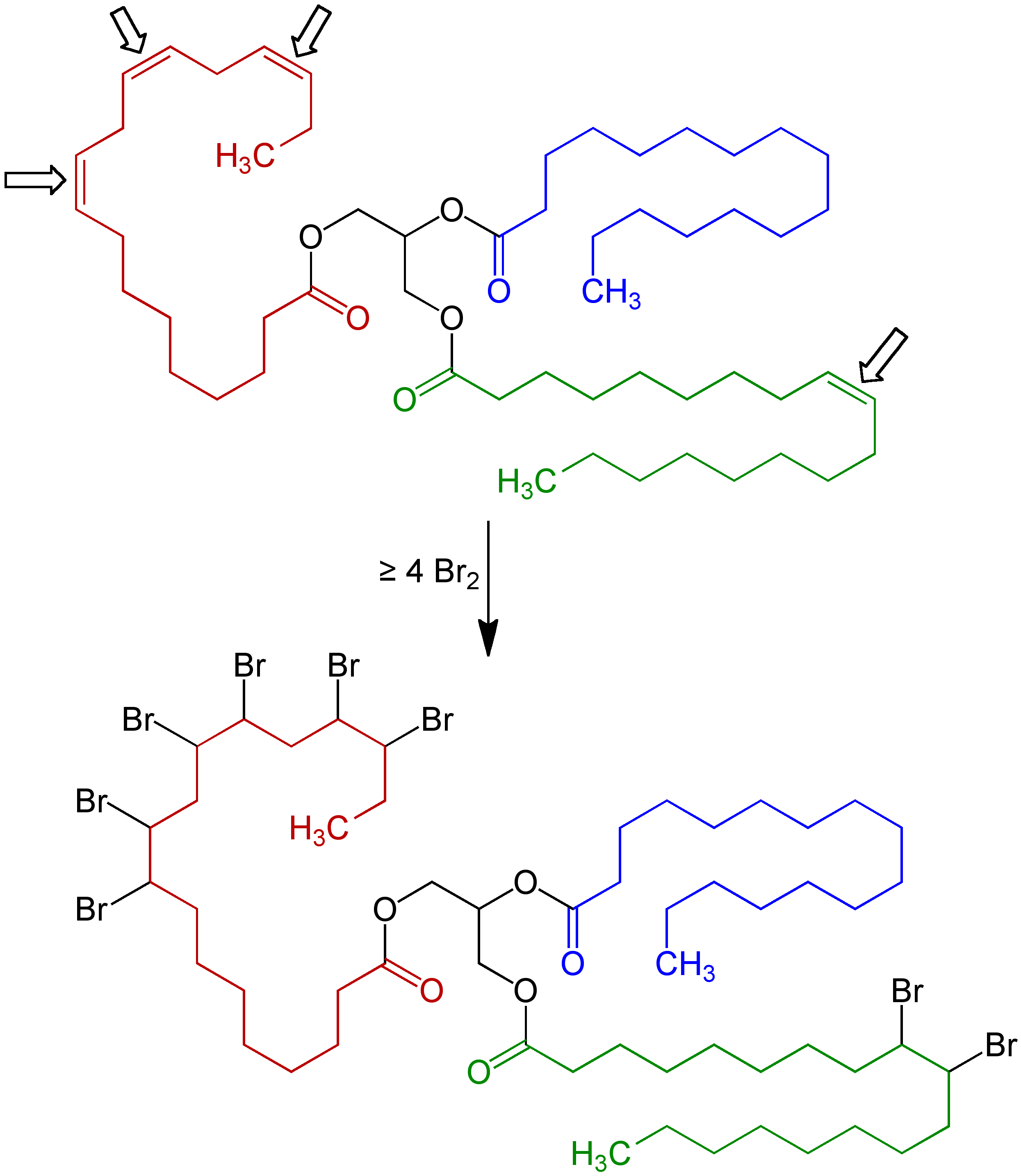
Diagram of a triglyceride, with its carbon-carbon double bonds being broken via bromination by elemental bromine

The color change that occurs when elemental bromine reacts with various classes of organic compounds is the basis for several analytical chemistry techniques. The qualitative bromine test detects the presence of alkenes and alkynes and of aromatic rings with certain substituent groups. The quantitative bromine number is the amount of bromine in grams that reacts with 100 g of a sample and was once used as a measure of the degree of unsaturation of aliphatics in gasoline and related petroleum samples. Bromine by itself, the Br_{2} molecule, is deeply colored but does not impart any color it is covalently bound to carbon in organobromides. Thus, a reaction between bromine and an organic compound can often be gauged visually.

The bromine number is similar to the iodine number, which is a similar technique used in evaluating the unsaturation of fats and fatty acids. Iodine is less reactive toward the tri- and tetra-substituted double bonds, found in petroleum-derived samples. The C=C double bonds in fats and fatty acids are exclusively disubstituted.

== Qualitative bromine test ==
The bromine test is a qualitative test for the presence of unsaturation:

- Alkenes and alkynes (carbon–carbon double and triple bonds), via an addition reaction
- phenols and anilines (benzene rings bearing electron-donating groups), via electrophilic aromatic substitution

Modern spectroscopic methods (e.g. NMR and infrared spectroscopy) are better at determining the structural features and identity of unknown compounds. The iodine value is also a way to determine the presence of unsaturation quantitatively.

An unknown sample is treated with a small amount of elemental bromine in a suitable solvent. Presence of unsaturation and/or phenol or aniline in the sample is shown by disappearance of the deep brown coloration of bromine when it has reacted with the unknown sample. The formation of a brominated phenol (i.e. 2,4,6-tribromophenol) or aniline (i.e. 2,4,6-tribromoaniline) in form of a white precipitate indicates that the unknown was a phenol or aniline. The more unsaturated an unknown is, the more bromine it reacts with, and the less coloured the solution will appear.

Test of unstauration is based on the following addition reaction:

R_{2}C=CR_{2} + Br_{2} → R_{2}C(Br)−C(Br)R_{2}

Should the brown colour not disappear, possibly due to the presence of an alkene which doesn't react, or reacts very slowly with, bromine, the potassium permanganate test can be performed, in order to determine the presence or absence of the alkene.

Test of phenols]and anilines, on the other hand, is based on electrophillic aromatic substitution.

== Quantitative bromine test ==
The bromine number is a quantitative measurement of the amount of reactivity a substance has towards bromine. Bromine reacts with an alkene structure in a 1:1 ratio and with an alkyne structure in a 2:1 ratio—one bromine for each π bond—so the number of bromine molecules that reacts corresponds to the number of π bonds. The bromine number is the amount of bromine in grams absorbed by 100 g of a sample.

The bromine number is usually determined by electrochemical titration, where bromine is generated in situ with the redox process of potassium bromide and bromate in an acidic solution, using a mercury catalyst to ensure the complete bromination of all olefins. Alternatively and more quantitatively, the bromine consumed by a sample can be determined by iodometry.

The technique can be subject to a variety of problems, whereby the sample consumes more or less bromine than predicted by the addition reaction. For example, some alkenes dimerize in the presence of bromine. Allylic bromination is another problem.

This measurement was once used as a measure of aliphatic unsaturation in gasoline and related petroleum samples, but this assay has fallen into disuse with the introduction of spectroscopic and chromatographic analyses.

== Related test methods ==
- Acid value
- Epoxy value
- Hydroxyl value
- Iodine value
- Peroxide value
- Saponification value

== See also ==
- Bromatometry
