= Hydroxyl value =

Mass of KOH needed to neutralize 1 gram of acetylized substance

In analytical chemistry, the hydroxyl value is defined as the number of milligrams of potassium hydroxide (KOH) required to neutralize the acetic acid taken up on acetylation of one gram of a chemical substance that contains free hydroxyl groups. The analytical method used to determine hydroxyl value traditionally involves acetylation of the free hydroxyl groups of the substance with acetic anhydride in pyridine solvent. After completion of the reaction, water is added, and the remaining unreacted acetic anhydride is converted to acetic acid and measured by titration with potassium hydroxide.

The hydroxyl value can be calculated using the following equation. Note that a chemical substance may also have a measurable acid value affecting the measured endpoint of the titration. The acid value (AV) of the substance, determined in a separate experiment, enters into this equation as a correction factor in the calculation of the hydroxyl value (HV):

$$\mathrm{HV}  =  \frac{56.1 \times N \times (V_\text{B} - V_\text{acet})}{W_\text{acet}}  +  \mathrm{AV}$$

Where HV is the hydroxyl value; V_{B} is the amount (ml) potassium hydroxide solution required for the titration of the blank; V_{acet} is the amount (ml) of potassium hydroxide solution required for the titration of the acetylated sample; W_{acet} is the weight of the sample (in grams) used for acetylation; N is the normality of the titrant; 56.1 is the molecular weight of potassium hydroxide (g/mol); AV is a separately determined acid value of the chemical substance.

The content of free hydroxyl groups in a substance can also be determined by methods other than acetylation. Determinations of hydroxyl content by other methods may instead be expressed as a weight percentage (wt. %) of hydroxyl groups in units of the mass of hydroxide functional groups in grams per 100 grams of substance. The conversion between hydroxyl value and other hydroxyl content measurements is obtained by multiplying the hydroxyl value by the factor 17/560. The chemical substance may be a fat, oil, natural or synthetic ester, or other polyol.

ASTM D 1957 and ASTM E222-10 describe several versions of this method of determining hydroxyl value.

== Uses and value ==
The value is important because it helps determine the Stoichiometry of a system for example in polyurethanes. The value may also be used to calculate equivalent weight and if the functionality is known, the molecular weight also.

== See also-related test methods ==
- Acid value
- Bromine number
- Amine value
- Epoxy value
- Iodine value
- Peroxide value
- Saponification value
- Acetyl number
