= Peroxide value =

Measure of peroxide content of a fat or oil

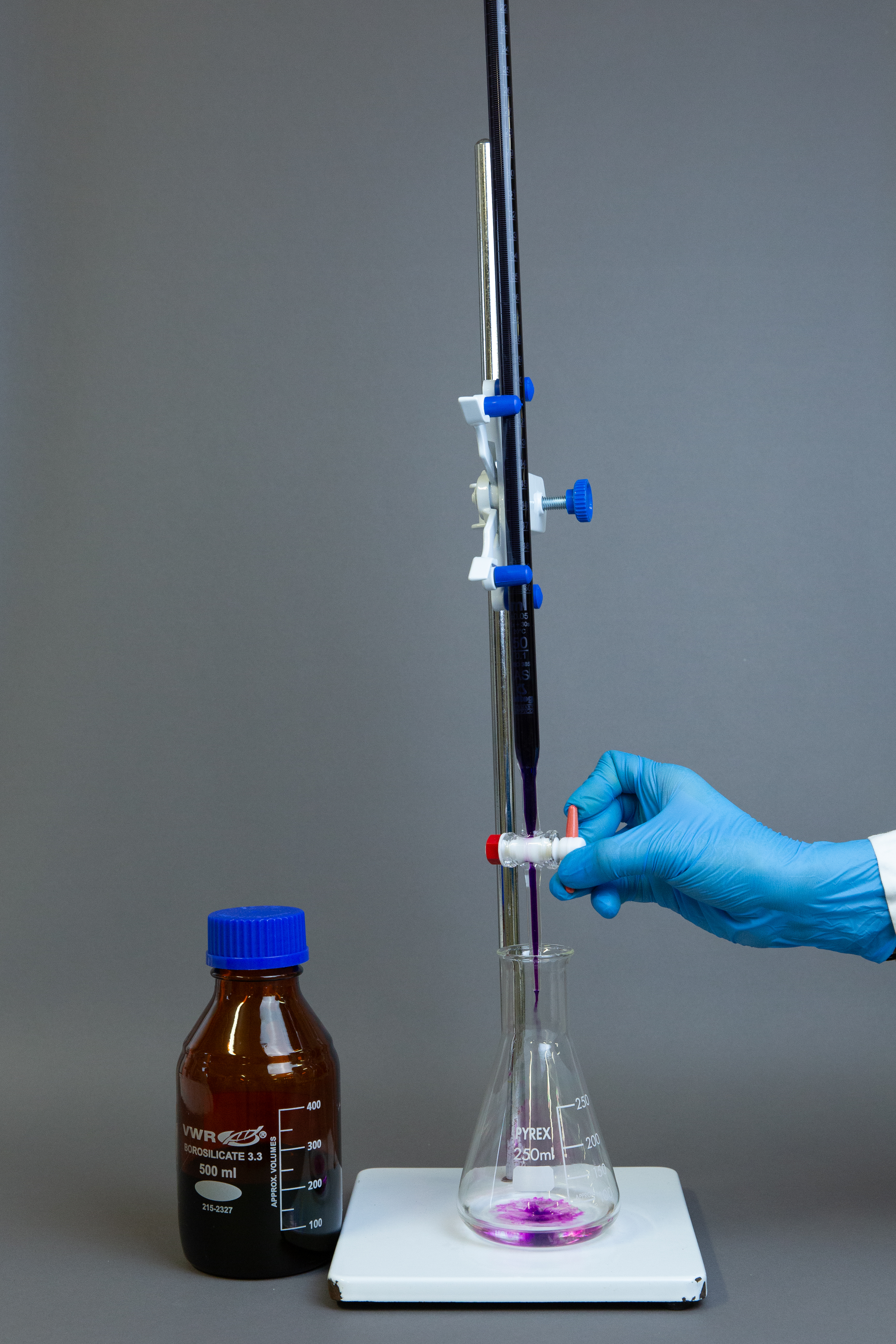
Titration setup for finding the peroxide value

Detection of peroxide gives the initial evidence of rancidity in unsaturated fats and oils. Other methods are available, but peroxide value is the most widely used. It gives a measure of the extent to which an oil sample has undergone primary oxidation; extent of secondary oxidation may be determined from p-anisidine test.

The double bonds found in fats and oils play a role in autoxidation. Oils with a high degree of unsaturation are most susceptible to autoxidation. The best test for autoxidation (oxidative rancidity) is determination of the peroxide value. Peroxides are intermediates in the autoxidation reaction.

Autoxidation is a free radical reaction involving oxygen that leads to deterioration of fats and oils which form off-flavours and off-odours. Peroxide value, concentration of peroxide in an oil or fat, is useful for assessing the extent to which spoilage has advanced.

== Definition ==
The peroxide value is defined as the amount of peroxide oxygen per 1 kilogram of fat or oil. Traditionally this was expressed in units of milliequivalents, although in SI units the appropriate option would be in millimoles per kilogram (N.B. 1 milliequivalents = 0.5 millimole; because 1 mEq of O_{2} =1 mmol/2 of O_{2} =0.5 mmol of O_{2}, where 2 is valence). The unit of milliequivalent has been commonly abbreviated as mequiv or even as meq.

== Method ==
The peroxide value is determined by measuring the amount of iodine which is formed by the reaction of peroxides (formed in fat or oil) with iodide ion.

2 I^{−} + H_{2}O + R−OOH → R−OH + 2 HO^{−} + I_{2}

The base produced in this reaction is taken up by the excess of acetic acid present. To measure the iodine, a redox titration is performed using sodium thiosulfate.

2 S_{2}O^{2−}_{3} + I_{2} → S_{4}O^{2−}_{6} + 2 I^{−}

The acidic conditions (excess acetic acid) prevents formation of hypoiodite (analogous to hypochlorite), which would interfere with the reaction.

A starch indicator solution is used, for which amylose forms a blue to black solution with iodine and is colorless when the iodine is converted to iodide titrated.

== Taste ==
Peroxide values of fresh oils are less than 10 milliequivalents/kg; when the peroxide value is between 30* and 40 milliequivalents/kg, a rancid taste is noticeable.

== See also ==
- Acid value
- Amine value
- Bromine number
- Epoxy value
- Hydroxyl value
- Iodine value
- Saponification value
