= Ester value =

Measure of ester content in fats and oils

The ester value (EV) is an analytical parameter used in chemistry to determine the amount of ester present in fats and oils. It represents the number of milligrams of potassium hydroxide (KOH) required to saponify the ester content in 1 gram of a substance, and is equivalent to the difference of the saponification value and the acid value.

== See also ==
- Acid value
- Iodine value
- Saponification value
- Triglyceride
- Fatty acid
