= Lard =

Semi-solid white pork fat product

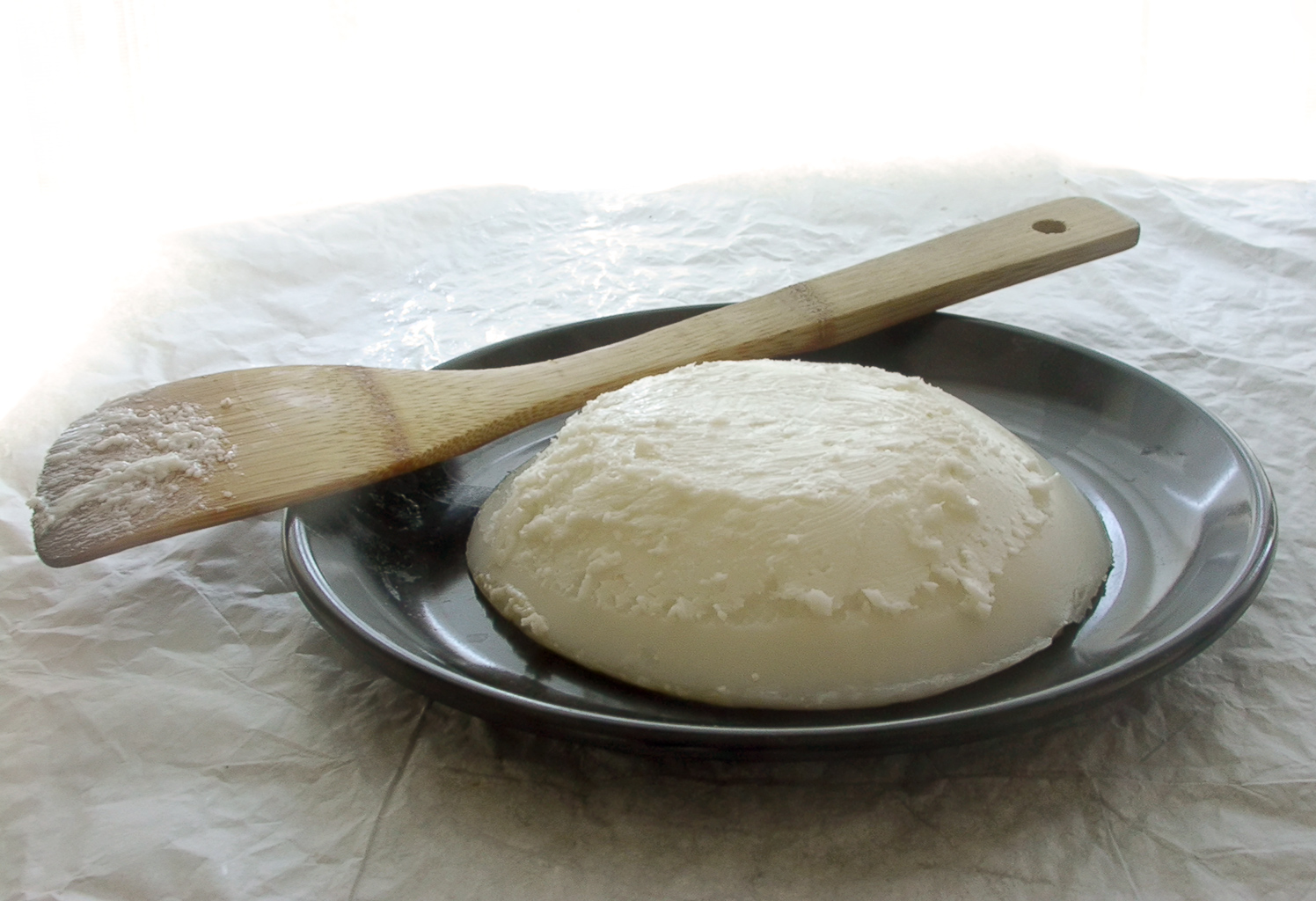
- Wet-rendered lard, from pork fatback

Fat composition

Saturated fats
- Total saturated: 38–43%: Palmitic acid: 25–28% Stearic acid: 12–14% Myristic acid: 1%

Unsaturated fats
- Total unsaturated: 56–62%
- Monounsaturated: 47–50%: Oleic acid: 44–47% Palmitoleic acid: 3%
- Polyunsaturated: Linoleic acid: 6–10%

Properties
- Food energy per 100 g (3.5 oz): 3,770 kJ (900 kcal)
- Melting point: backfat: 30–40 °C (86–104 °F) leaf fat: 43–48 °C (109–118 °F) mixed fat: 36–45 °C (97–113 °F)
- Smoke point: 121–218 °C (250–424 °F)
- Specific gravity at 20 °C (68 °F): 0.917–0.938
- Iodine value: 45–75
- Acid value: 3.4
- Saponification value: 190–205
- Unsaponifiable: 0.8%

Lard is a semi-solid white fat product obtained by rendering the fatty tissue of a pig. It is distinguished from tallow, a similar product derived from fat of cattle or sheep.

Lard can be rendered by steaming, boiling, or dry heat. The culinary qualities of lard vary somewhat depending on the origin and processing method; if properly rendered, it may be nearly odorless and tasteless. It has a high saturated fatty acid content and no trans fat. At retail, refined lard is usually sold as paper-wrapped blocks.

Many cuisines use lard as a cooking fat or shortening, or as a spread in the same ways as butter. It is an ingredient in various savoury dishes such as sausages, pâtés, and fillings. As a replacement for butter, it provides flakiness to pastry. In western cuisine, it has ceded its popularity to vegetable oils, but many cooks and bakers still favor it over other fats for certain uses.

== History ==
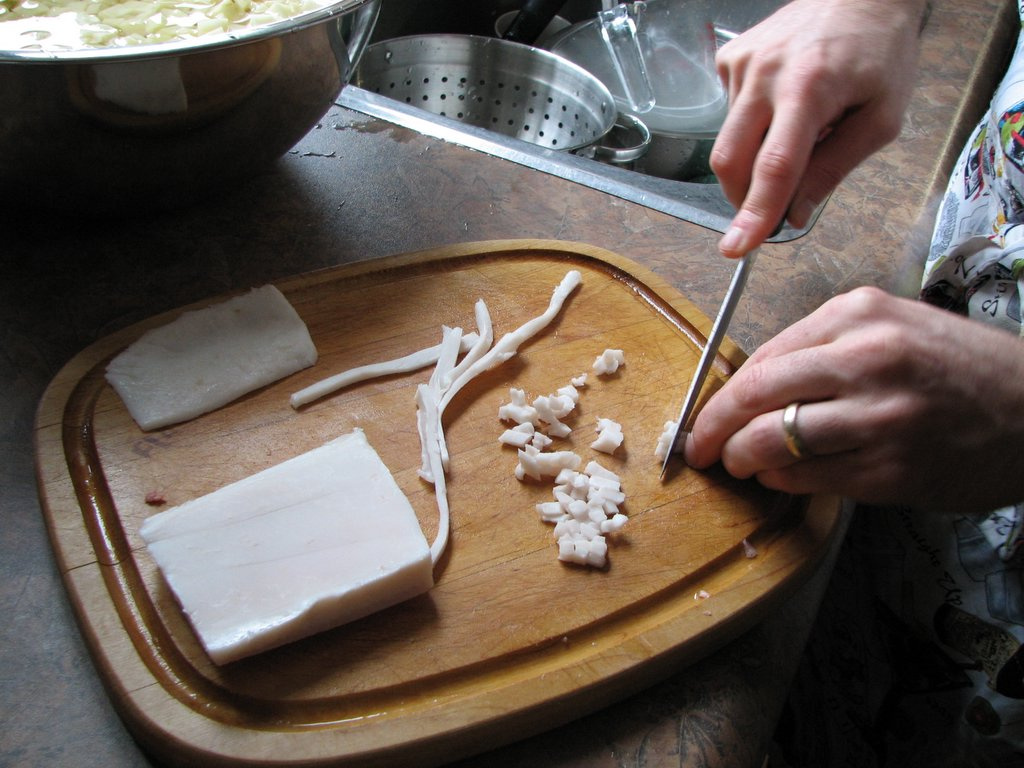
Raw fatback being diced to prepare tourtière

Lard has always been an important cooking and baking staple in cultures where pork is an important dietary item, with pig fat often being as valuable a product as pork.

During the 19th century, lard was used in a similar way to butter in North America and many European nations. Lard remained about as popular as butter in the early 20th century and was widely used as a substitute for butter during World War II. As a readily available by-product of modern pork production, lard had been cheaper than most vegetable oils, and it was common in many people's diet until the Industrial Revolution made vegetable oils more common and more affordable. Vegetable shortenings were developed in the early 1900s, which made it possible to use vegetable-based fats in baking and in other uses where solid fats were called for. Upton Sinclair's novel The Jungle, though fictional, portrayed men falling into rendering vats and being sold as lard, which generated negative publicity.

By the late 20th century lard began to be considered less healthy than vegetable oils (such as olive and sunflower oil) because of its high content of saturated fatty acids and cholesterol. However, despite its reputation, lard has less saturated fat, more unsaturated fat and less cholesterol than an equal amount of butter by weight. Unhydrogenated lard contains no transfats. It has also been regarded as a "poverty food".

In the 1990s and early 2000s, however, chefs and bakers rediscovered lard's unique culinary values, leading to a partial rehabilitation of this fat among "foodies". Negative publicity about the transfat content of the partially hydrogenated vegetable oils in vegetable shortening has partially driven this trend. Chef and food writer Rick Bayless is a prominent proponent of the virtues of lard for certain types of cooking.

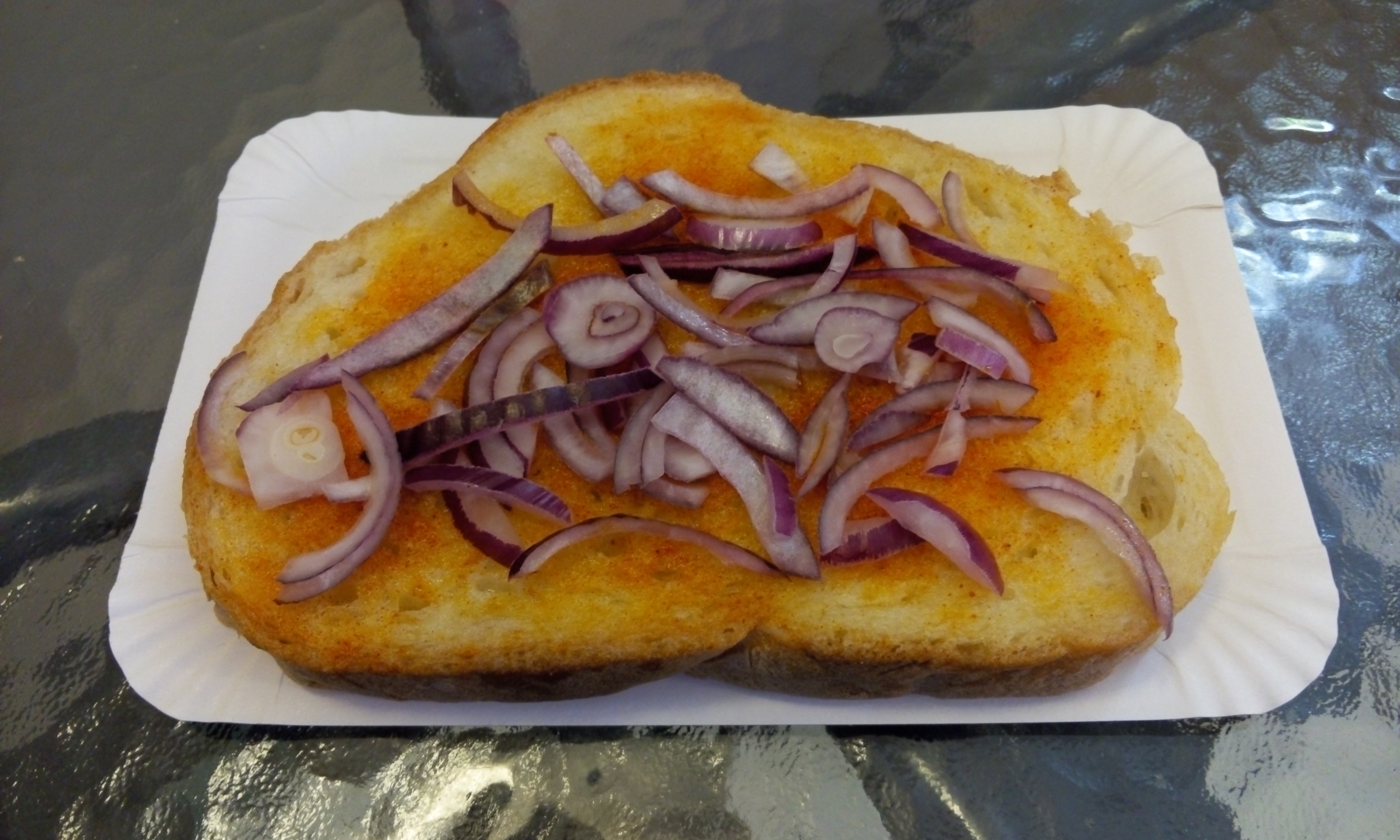
Zsíros kenyér or zsíros deszka ("lardy plank") from Hungary. It is eaten with red onions and paprika.

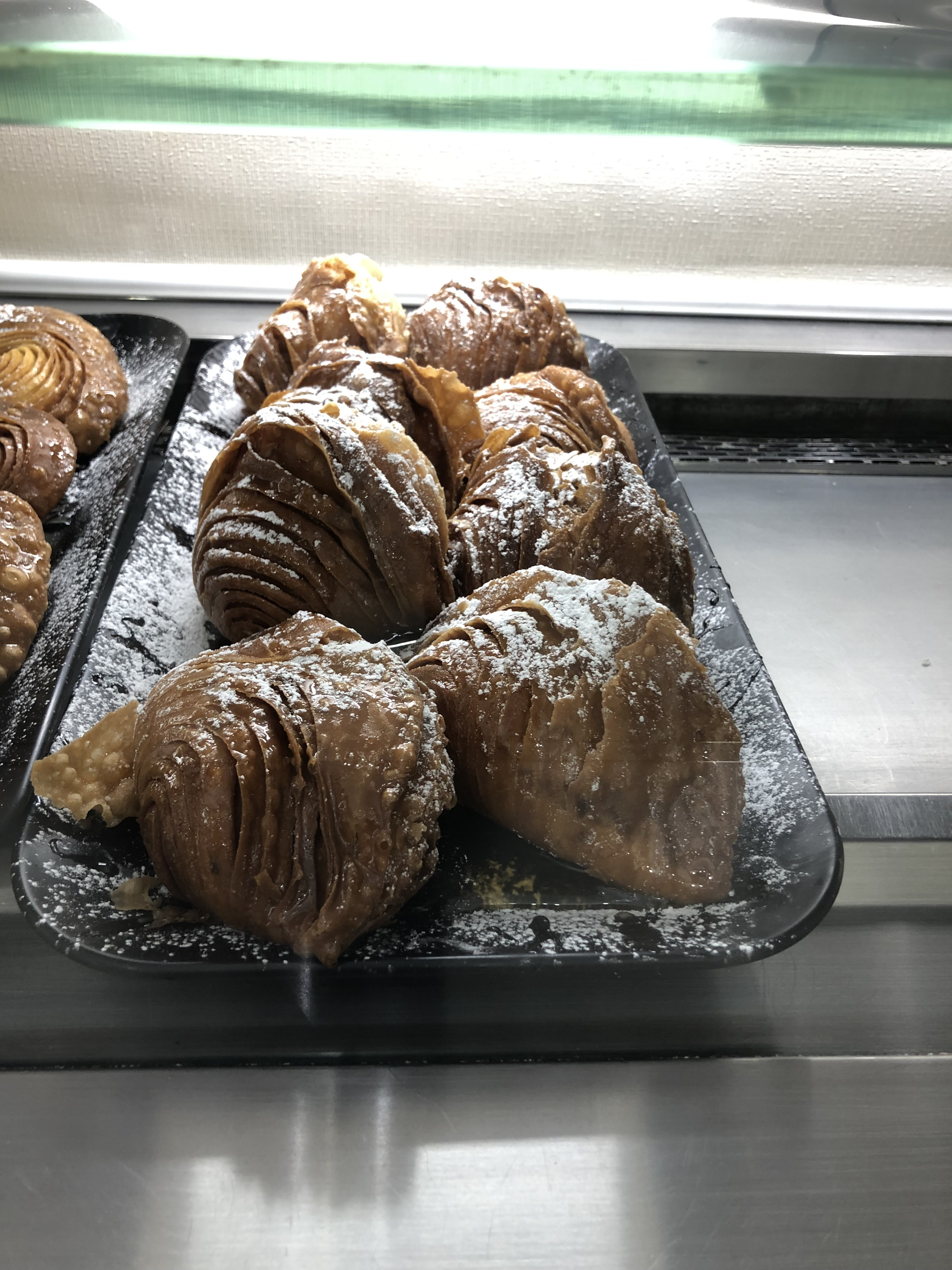
The raviola di ricotta nissena a Sicilian dessert strictly fried in lard

It is also again becoming popular in the United Kingdom among aficionados of traditional British cuisine. This led to a "lard crisis" in late 2004.

== Production ==
Lard is produced mainly in China, followed by Germany, Brazil, United States, and Russia.

	Country	Production, 2018 (tonnes)
1	China	2,544,847
2	Germany	549,989
3	Brazil	508,600
4	United States	447,474
5	Russia	434,100
6	Italy	215,513
7	Poland	174,649
8	Romania	148,997
9	France	146,519
10	Mexico	143,842

Lard can be obtained from any part of the pig that has a high concentration of fatty tissue. The highest grade of lard, known as leaf lard, is obtained from the "flare" visceral fat deposit surrounding the kidneys and inside the loin. Leaf lard has little pork flavor, making it ideal for use in baked goods, where it is valued for its ability to produce flaky, moist pie crusts. The next-highest grade is obtained from fatback, the hard subcutaneous fat between the pig's back skin and muscle. The lowest grade (for purposes of rendering into lard) is obtained from the soft caul fat surrounding digestive organs, such as small intestines, though caul fat is often used directly as a wrapping for roasting lean meats or in the manufacture of pâtés.

Lard may be rendered by two processes: wet or dry. In wet rendering, pig fat is boiled in water or steamed at a high temperature and the lard, which is insoluble in water, is skimmed from the surface of the mixture or separated in an industrial centrifuge. In dry rendering, the fat is exposed to high heat in a pan or oven without water (a process similar to frying bacon). The two processes yield somewhat differing products. Wet-rendered lard has a more neutral flavor, a lighter color, and a high smoke point. Dry-rendered lard is somewhat browner and has a caramelized flavor and has a lower smoke point.

Industrially-produced lard, including much of the lard sold in supermarkets, is rendered from a mixture of high and low quality fat from throughout the pig. Lard is often hydrogenated to improve its stability at room temperature. Hydrogenated lard sold to consumers typically contains fewer than 0.5 g of transfats per 13 g serving. Lard is also often treated with bleaching and deodorizing agents, emulsifiers, and antioxidants such as BHT. These treatments make it more consistent and prevent spoilage. (Untreated lard must be refrigerated or frozen to prevent rancidity.)

Consumers wanting a higher-quality source of lard typically seek out artisanal producers, or render it themselves from leaf lard or fatback.

A by-product of dry-rendering lard is deep-fried meat, skin and membrane tissue known as cracklings.

=== Composition ===
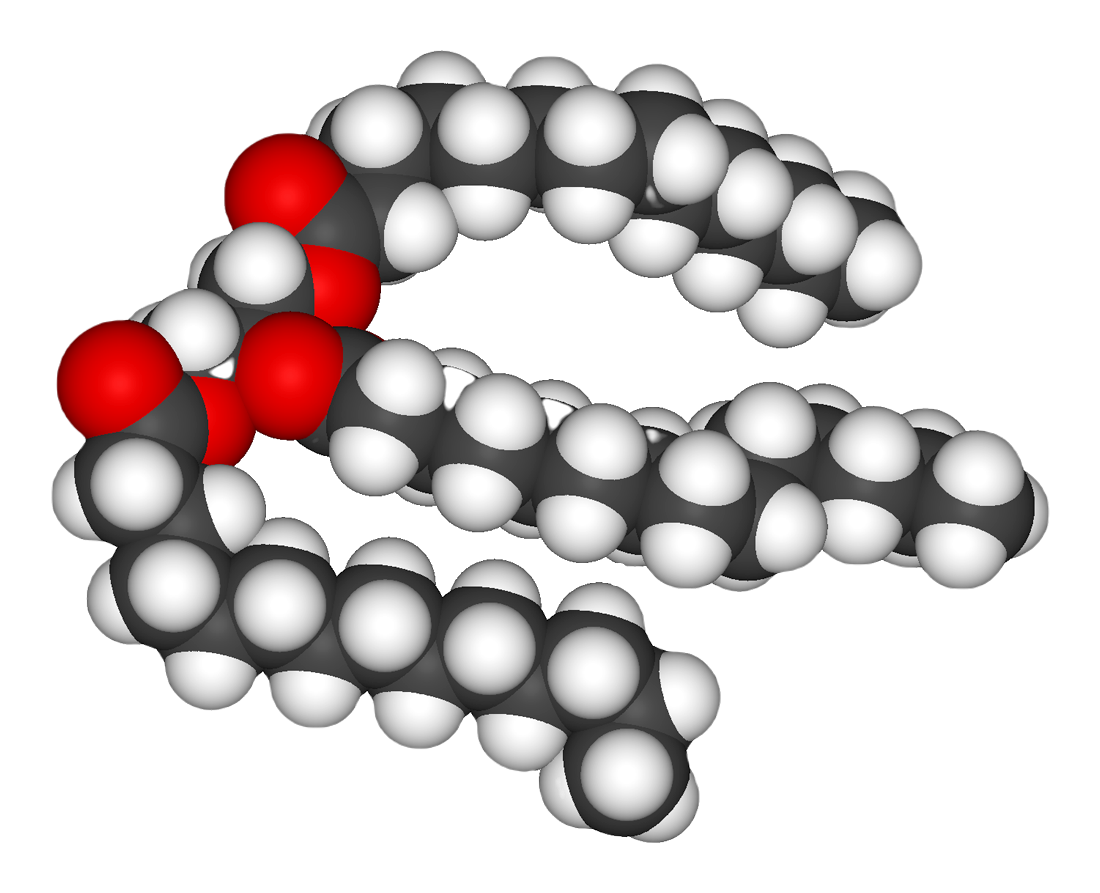
A triglyceride molecule, the main constituent of lard

Lard consists mainly of fats,specifically triglycerides. Triglycerides contain three fatty acids, varying from one triglyceride to another. In general lard is similar to tallow in its composition. About 20% of lard is the achiral triglyceride with palmitic acid on carbon 2 and oleic acid on carbons 1 and 3. Pigs that have been fed different diets will have lard with a significantly different fatty acid content and iodine value. Peanut-fed hogs or the acorn-fed pigs raised for Jamón ibérico therefore produce a somewhat different kind of lard compared to pigs raised in North American farms that are fed maize.

== Culinary use ==
Lard is one of the few edible oils with a relatively high smoke point, attributable to its high saturated fatty acids content. Pure lard is especially useful for cooking since it produces little smoke when heated and has a distinct flavor when combined with other foods. Many chefs and bakers prize lard over other types of shortening because of its flavor and range of applications.

=== Nutritional value ===
Lard
Nutritional value per 100 g (3.5 oz)
- Energy: 3,765.6 kJ (900.0 kcal)
- Carbohydrates: 0 g
- Fat: 100 g
- Saturated: 39 g
- Monounsaturated: 45 g
- Polyunsaturated: 11 g
- Protein: 0 g
Vitamins and minerals
Vitamins	Quantity %DV^{†}
Vitamin E	4% 0.6 mg
- Other constituents: Quantity
- Cholesterol: 95 mg
- Zinc: 0.1 mg
- Selenium: 0.2 mg
- Fat percentage can vary
- ^{†}Percentages estimated using US recommendations for adults.

=== Compared to other fats ===
Properties of common cooking fats (per 100 g)
Type of fat	Total fat (g)	Saturated fat (g)	Monounsaturated fat (g)	Polyunsaturated fat (g)	Smoke point
Butter	81	51	21	3	150 °C (302 °F)
Canola oil	100	6–7	62–64	24–26	205 °C (401 °F)
Coconut oil	99	83	6	2	177 °C (351 °F)
Corn oil	100	13–14	27–29	52–54	230 °C (446 °F)
Lard	100	39	45	11	190 °C (374 °F)
Peanut oil	100	16	57	20	225 °C (437 °F)
Olive oil	100	13–19	59–74	6–16	190 °C (374 °F)
Rice bran oil	100	25	38	37	250 °C (482 °F)
Soybean oil	100	15	22	57–58	257 °C (495 °F)
Suet	94	52	32	3	200 °C (392 °F)
Ghee	99	62	29	4	204 °C (399 °F)
Sunflower oil	100	10	20	66	225 °C (437 °F)
Sunflower oil (high oleic)	100	12	84	4	
Vegetable shortening	100	25	41	28	165 °C (329 °F)

=== In baking ===
Because of the relatively large fat crystals in lard, it is extremely effective as a shortening in baking. Pie crusts made with lard tend to be flakier than those made with butter. Many cooks employ both types of fat in their pastries to combine the shortening properties of lard with the flavor of butter.

=== In cuisines ===
Lard was once widely used in the cuisines of Europe, China and the New World and still plays a significant role in British, Central European, Mexican and Chinese cuisines. In British cuisine, lard is a traditional ingredient in mince pies and Christmas puddings, lardy cake and for frying fish and chips as well as many other uses.

Lard is traditionally one of the main ingredients in the Scandinavian pâté leverpostej.

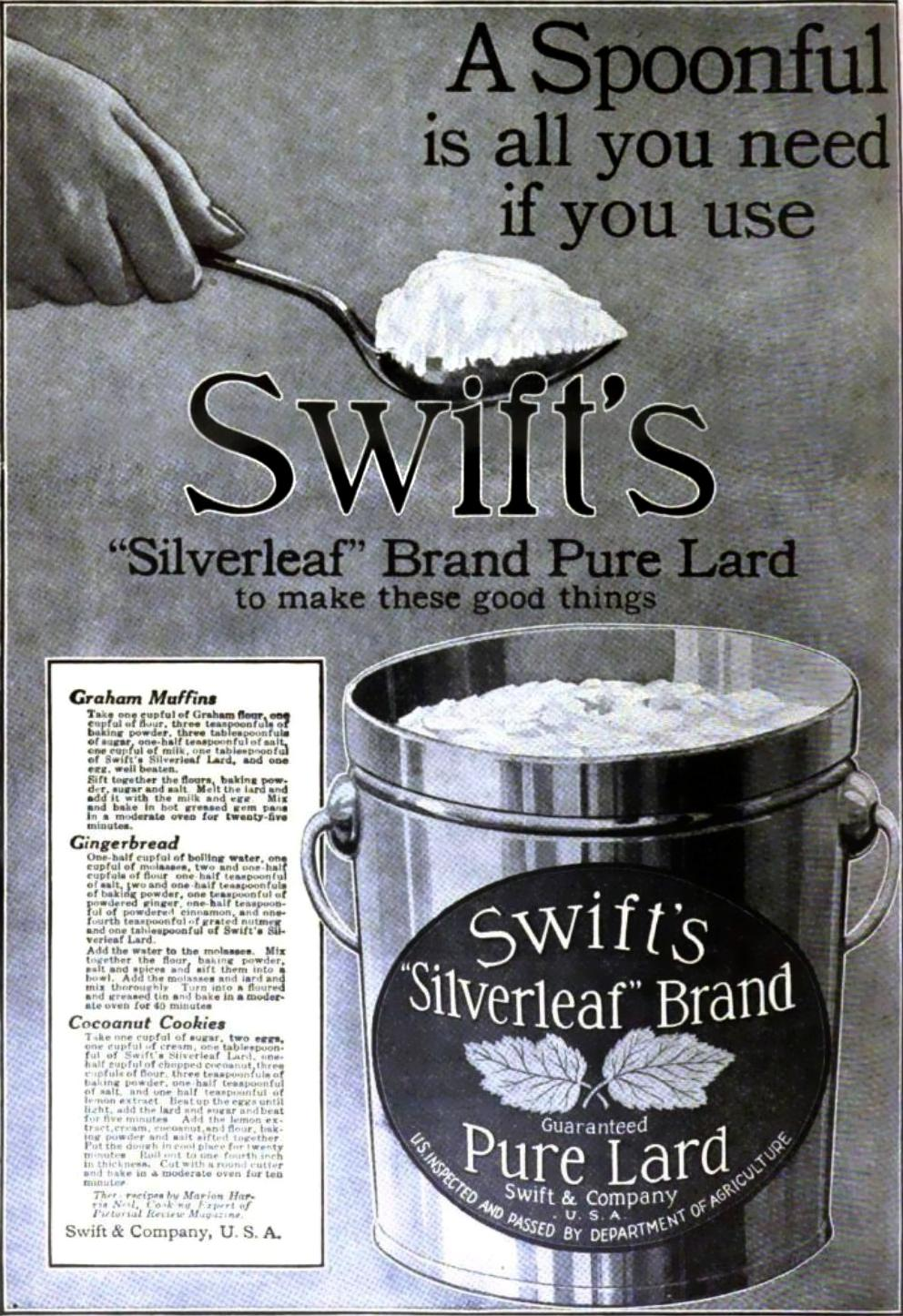
1916 advertisement for lard produced by Swift & Company

In Spain, one of the most popular versions of the Andalusian breakfast includes several kinds of mantecas differently seasoned, consumed spread over toasted bread. Among other variants, manteca colorá (lard with paprika) and zurrapa de lomo (lard with pork flakes) are the preferred ones. In Catalan cuisine lard is used to make the dough for the pastry known as coca. In the Balearics particularly, ensaïmada dough also contains lard.

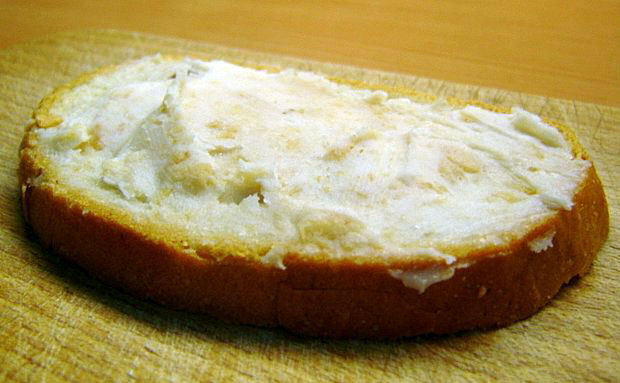
A slice of bread spread with lard was a typical staple in traditional rural cuisine of many countries.

Lard consumed as a spread on bread was once very common in Europe and North America, especially those areas where dairy fats and vegetable oils were rare.

As the demand for lard grows in the high-end restaurant industry, small farmers have begun to specialize in heritage hog breeds with higher body-fat contents than the leaner, modern hog. Breeds such as the Mangalitsa hog of Hungary or Large Black pig of Great Britain are experiencing an enormous resurgence, to the point that breeders are unable to keep up with demand.

When used without qualification the word 'lard' in English generally refers to wet-rendered lard, which has a very mild, neutral flavor as opposed to the more noticeably pork-flavored dry-rendered lard, or dripping. Dripping sandwiches are still popular in several European countries—Hungarian zsíroskenyér ("lardy bread") or zsírosdeszka ("lardy plank"), and German "Fettbemme", seasoned pork fat. Similar snacks are sometimes served with beer in Poland, Czech Republic, and Slovakia. They are generally topped with onions, served with salt and paprika, and eaten as a side-dish with beer. All of these are commonly translated on menus as "lard" sandwiches, perhaps due to the lack of familiarity of most contemporary English native speakers with dripping. Attempts to use Hungarian zsír or Polish smalec (both meaning "fat/lard") when British recipes calling for lard will reveal the difference between the wet-rendered lard and dripping. In Taiwan, Hong Kong and Macao, as well as in many parts of China, lard was often consumed mixed into cooked rice along with soy sauce to make "lard rice" (豬油拌飯 or 豬油撈飯). And in Japan, back loin (fatback) lard is frequently used for ramen, creating a thick, nutty, slightly sweet and very hearty dish.

Traditionally, along with peanut oil, lard is extensively used in Asian cooking as a general-purpose cooking oil, esp. in stir-fries and deep-frying.

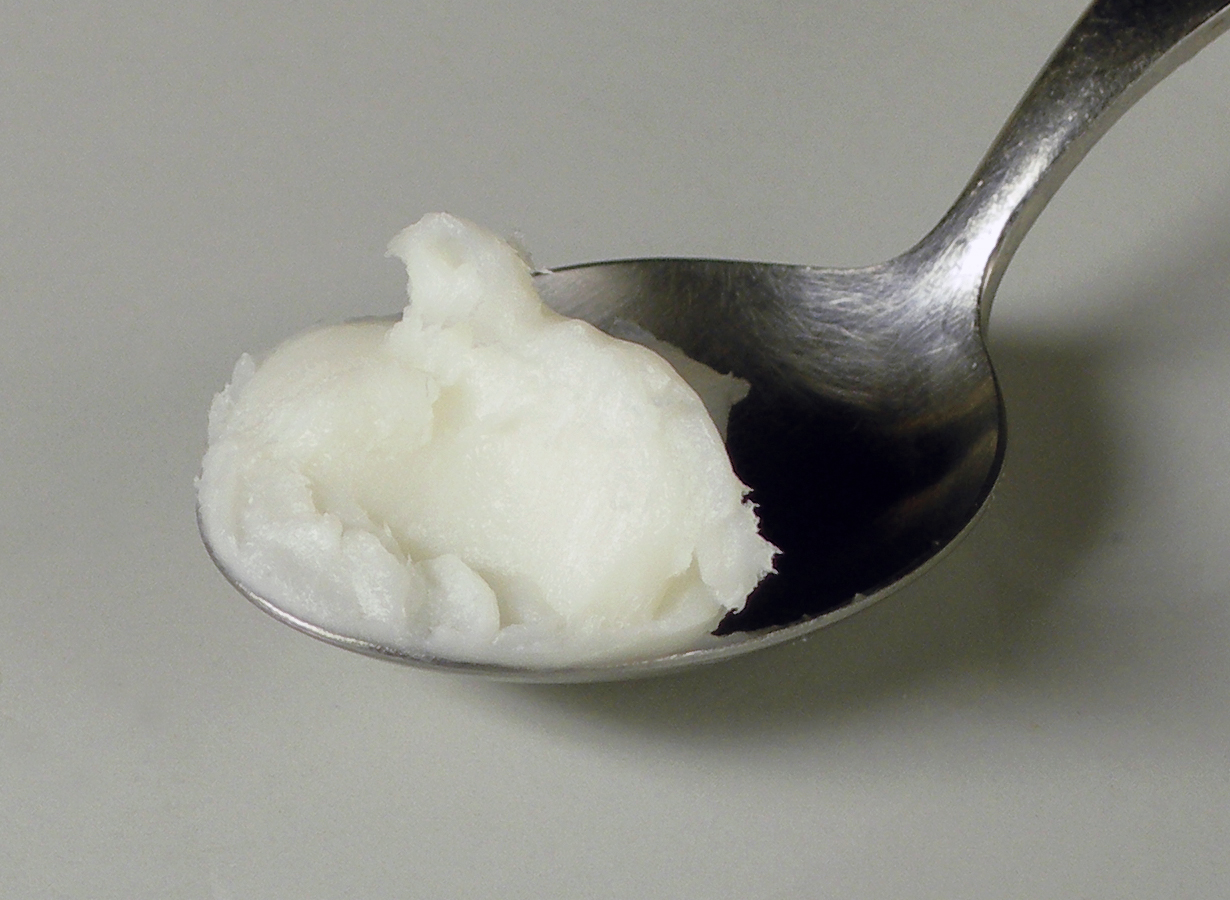
Schweineschmalz, German lard

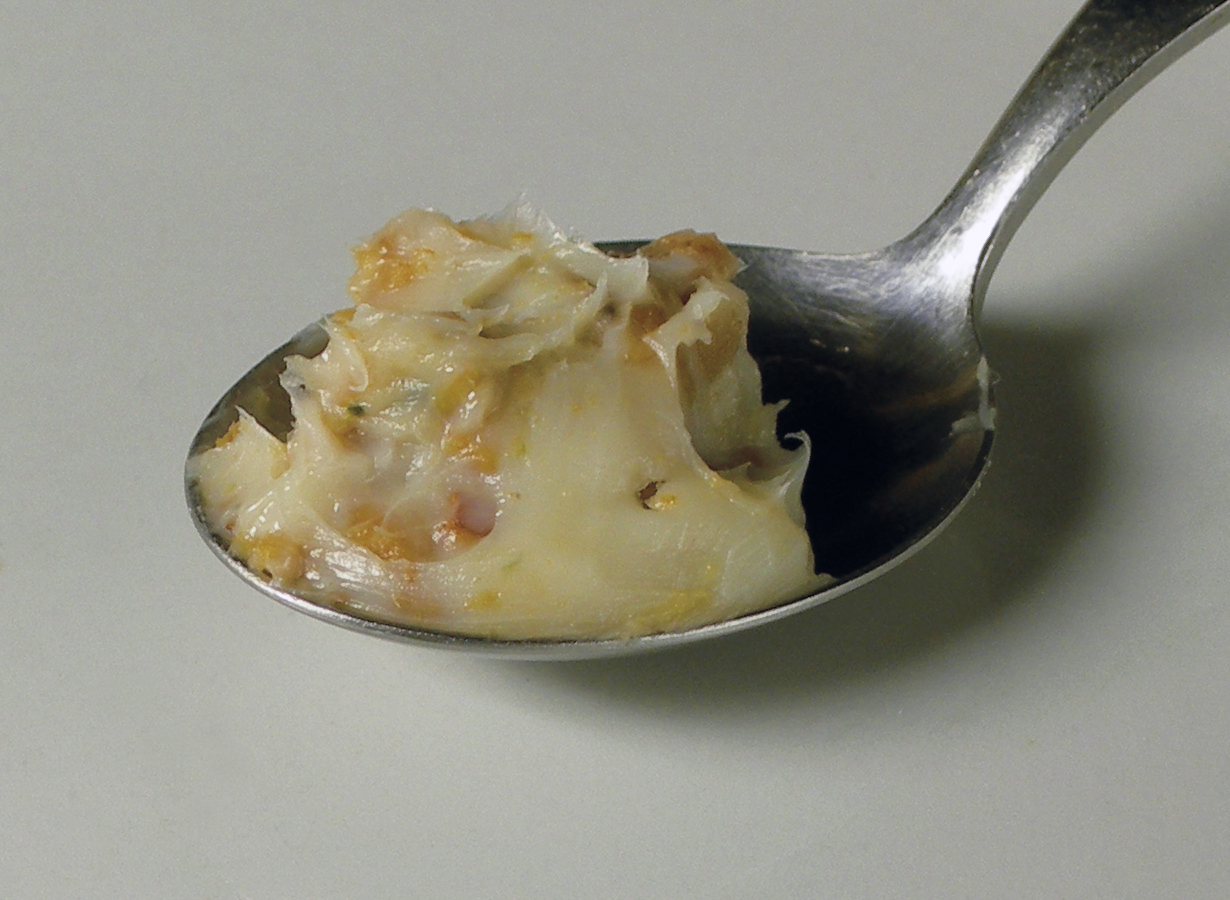
Griebenschmalz, German lard with crispy pieces of pork skin

In Germany lard is called Schweineschmalz (literally, "rendered fat from swine") and has been a longtime favorite as a spread. It can be served plain, or it can be mixed with seasonings: pork fat can be enhanced with small pieces of pork skin, called Grieben (cf. Yiddish gribenes) to create Griebenschmalz. Other recipes call for small pieces of apple or onion. In English, however, schmaltz usually refers to kosher fat rendered from chicken, duck or goose.

Vegetarian Grieben from onions or apples, which began as a makeshift means of diluting Schmalz in time of need, became rather popular on their own account because they allow for a specific taste and a lower fat content. Completely vegetarian Schmalz-like spreads based on vegetable fats use those ingredients as well. In Germany it is forbidden to use the term Schmalz for non-lard products.

In Poland, lard is most commonly used as a spread on bread (oftentimes paired with salt) or is a part of a recipe, for example it is sometimes used in making of Toruń gingerbread.

In Ukrainian cuisine lard was historically used for preservation of sausages.

== Other uses ==
Rendered lard can be used to produce biofuel and soap. Lard is also useful as a cutting fluid in machining. Its use in machining has declined since the mid-20th century as other specially engineered cutting fluids became prominent. However, it is still a viable option. Lard and other animal fats were formerly used as an anti-foaming agent in industrial fermentation processes such as brewing; there, animal fats have been superseded by polyethers.

== See also ==
- Lardy cake, an English bread with heavy lard content
- Suet, like leaf lard
- Whale blubber
