= Biodiesel standard =

Biodiesel has a number of standards for its quality.

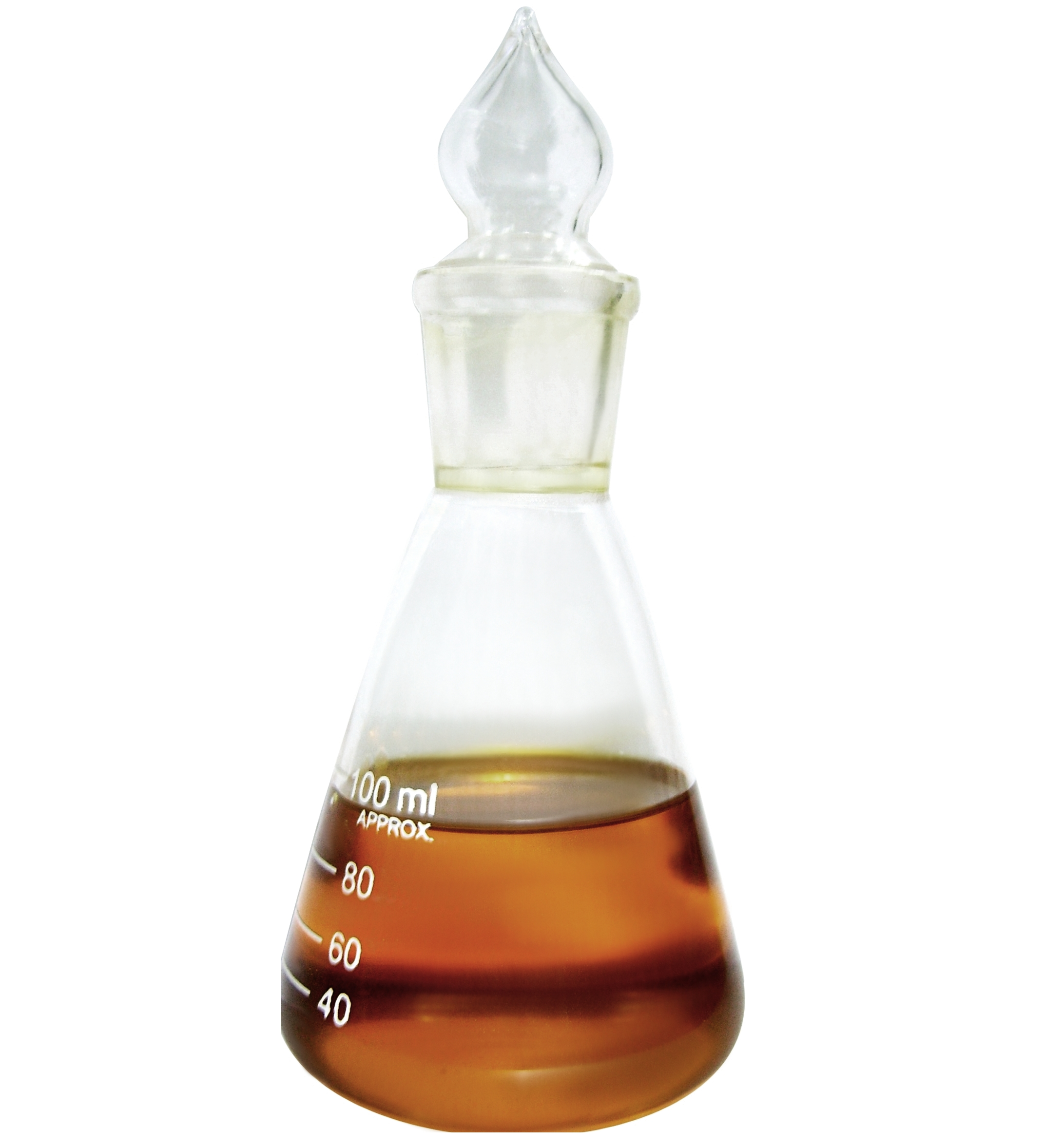
Biodiesel sample

The European standard for biodiesel is EN 14214, which is translated into the respective national standards for each country that forms the CEN (European Committee for Standardization) area e.g., for the United Kingdom, BS EN 14214 and for Germany DIN EN 14214. It may be used outside the CEN area as well. The main difference that exists between EN 14214 standards of different countries is the national annex detailing climate related requirements of biodiesel in different CEN member countries.

Other international standards published by ASTM International include:

- D6751-08 Specification for Biodiesel Fuel Blend Stock (B100) for Middle Distillate Fuels
- D975-08a Specification for Diesel Fuel Oils (on and off-road applications)
- D396-08b Specification for Fuel Oils (home heating and boiler applications)
- D7467-08 Specification for Diesel Fuel Oil, Biodiesel Blend (B6 to B20)

There are also DIN standards for three different varieties of biodiesel, which are made of different oils:

- RME (rapeseed methyl ester, according to DIN E 51606)
- PME (vegetable methyl ester, purely vegetable products, according to DIN E 51606)
- FME (fat methyl ester, vegetable and animal products, according to DIN V 51606)

The National Standards of Canada for biodiesel are published by the Canadian General Standards Board (CGSB):

- CAN/CGSB-3.520 Diesel Fuel Containing Low Levels of Biodiesel (B1 - B5)
- CAN/CGSB-3.522 Diesel Fuel Containing Biodiesel (B6-B20)
- CAN/CGSB-3.524 Biodiesel (B100) for Blending in Middle Distillate Fuels

== Objective ==
The standards ensure that the following important factors in the fuel production process are satisfied:

- Acid value
- Complete reaction.
- Removal of glycerin.
- Removal of catalyst.
- Removal of alcohol.
- Absence of free fatty acids.
- Low sulfur content.
- Cold Filter Plugging point
- Cloud Point

Basic industrial tests to determine whether the products conform to the standards typically include gas chromatography, a test that verifies only the more important of the variables above. Tests that are more complete are more expensive. Fuel meeting the quality standards is very non-toxic, with a toxicity rating (LD_{50}) of greater than 50 mL/kg.

== ASTM B20 ==
ASTM International has approved a new specification for diesel fuel blends containing 6%-20% biodiesel. According to the National Biodiesel Board (NBB), ASTM standards for the 20% biodiesel blends, or B20, are a crucial hurdle for the full acceptance of the use of such blends in diesel vehicles. In 2008, ASTM published new Biodiesel Blend Specifications.

With the new specification in place, automakers and engine manufacturers can test B20 in their diesel engines and know that consumers will be fueling their vehicle with a fuel of the same quality. Currently, Chrysler LLC supports the use of B20 in its Dodge Ram diesel pickups, but only for use in fleets. Likewise, General Motors Corporation accepts the use of 5% biodiesel blends, or B5, in all its vehicles, but limits the use of B20 to special equipment options available only to government fleets in a limited selection of vehicles. While setting the new B20 standard, ASTM International also made changes to its specifications for B5 and for 100% biodiesel, or B100.

The FTC will require pumps with biodiesel blends to carry a blue label, while biomass-based diesel blends will carry an orange label. The somewhat confusing "small print" was required by the energy act. Credit: Federal Trade Commission

Engine warranty concerns also came into play in a recent effort to create labeling requirements for diesel fuels containing renewable fuel blends. The Energy Independence and Security Act of 2007 requires the Federal Trade Commission (FTC) to set labeling requirements that address the blending of biodiesel and other types of biomass-based diesel fuels into diesel fuel. Some companies are converting biomass such as animal fats directly into a liquid with the properties of diesel fuel, a product that blurs the lines between biodiesel and diesel fuel. At first, the FTC proposed to treat all renewable diesel fuels the same, but the NBB warned that not all biomass-based diesel fuels would necessarily meet the ASTM standards required by automakers for diesel fuels. On the other hand, biomass-based diesel fuels that meet ASTM standards could be used in much higher concentrations than biodiesel, which is usually limited to 20% biodiesel blends for standard diesel vehicles. Considering those comments, the FTC decided to set separate labeling requirements for biodiesel blends and biomass-based diesel fuel blends.
