= Saturated and unsaturated compounds =

Classification of organic compounds based on nature of their chemical bonds

A saturated compound is a chemical compound (or ion) that resists addition reactions, such as hydrogenation, oxidative addition, and the binding of a Lewis base. The term is used in many contexts and classes of chemical compounds. Overall, saturated compounds are less reactive than unsaturated compounds. Saturation is derived from the Latin word saturare, meaning 'to fill'. An unsaturated compound is also a chemical compound (or ion) that attracts reduction reactions, such as dehydrogenation and oxidative reduction.

== Organic chemistry ==
Generally distinct types of unsaturated organic compounds are recognized. For hydrocarbons:

- alkene (unsaturated) vs alkane (saturated)
- alkyne (unsaturated) vs alkane (saturated)
- arene (unsaturated) vs cycloalkane (saturated)

For organic compounds containing heteroatoms (other than C and H), the list of unsaturated groups is long but some common types are:

- carbonyl, e.g. ketones, aldehydes, esters, carboxylic acids (unsaturated) vs alcohol or ether (saturated)
- nitrile (unsaturated) vs amine (saturated)
- nitro (unsaturated) vs amine (saturated)

Saturated compounds
Ethane	Propane	1-Octanol

Unsaturated compounds
Ethylene	Acetylene	alpha-Linolenic acid, an unsaturated fatty acid

Unsaturated compounds generally carry out typical addition reactions that are not possible with saturated compounds such as alkanes. A saturated organic compound has only single bonds between carbon atoms. An important class of saturated compounds are the alkanes. Many saturated compounds have functional groups, e.g., alcohols.

=== Unsaturated organic compounds ===
The concept of saturation can be described using various naming systems, formulas, and analytical tests. For instance, IUPAC nomenclature is a system of naming conventions used to describe the type and location of unsaturation within organic compounds. The "degree of unsaturation" is a formula used to summarize and diagram the amount of hydrogen that a compound can bind. Unsaturation can be determined by NMR, mass spectrometry, and IR spectroscopy, or by determining a compound's bromine number or iodine number.

=== Fatty acids and fats ===
The bottom chain of this fat is unsaturated.

The terms saturated vs unsaturated are often applied to the fatty acid constituents of fats. The triglycerides (fats) that comprise tallow are derived from the saturated stearic and monounsaturated oleic acids. Many vegetable oils contain fatty acids with one (monounsaturated) or more (polyunsaturated) double bonds in them.

== Saturated and unsaturated compounds beyond organic chemistry ==
=== Organometallic chemistry ===
IrCl(CO)(PPh3)2 is an unsaturated coordination complex.

In organometallic chemistry, a coordinatively unsaturated complex has fewer than 18 valence electrons and thus is susceptible to oxidative addition or coordination of an additional ligand. Unsaturation is the characteristic of many catalysts. The opposite of coordinatively unsaturated is coordinatively saturated. Complexes that are coordinatively saturated rarely exhibit catalytic properties.

=== Surfaces ===
In physical chemistry, when referring to surface processes, saturation denotes the degree at which a binding site is fully occupied. For example, base saturation refers to the fraction of exchangeable cations that are base cations.
