= C6H16N2 =

The molecular formula C_{6}H_{16}N_{2} (molar mass: 116.21 g/mol, exact mass: 116.1313 u) may refer to:

- Hexamethylenediamine
- Tetramethylethylenediamine (TMEDA or TEMED)
