= C12–C14 alcohol glycidyl ether =

- n = 10-12

Names
- IUPAC name 2-(dodecoxymethyl)oxirane;2-(tetradecoxymethyl)oxirane;2-(tridecoxymethyl)oxirane
- Other names Alkyl glycidyl ether

Identifiers
CAS Number	68609-97-2
3D model (JSmol)	Interactive image
ChemSpider	22504671
ECHA InfoCard	100.065.295
PubChem CID	56846565
CompTox Dashboard (EPA)	DTXSID7028774
- InChI: InChI=1S/C17H34O2.C16H32O2.C15H30O2/c1-2-3-4-5-6-7-8-9-10-11-12-13-14-18-15-17-16-19-17;1-2-3-4-5-6-7-8-9-10-11-12-13-17-14-16-15-18-16;1-2-3-4-5-6-7-8-9-10-11-12-16-13-15-14-17-15/h17H,2-16H2,1H3;16H,2-15H2,1H3;15H,2-14H2,1H3 Key: CKNWGKWITWNVEY-UHFFFAOYSA-N
- SMILES: CCCCCCCCCCCCCCOCC1CO1.CCCCCCCCCCCCCOCC1CO1.CCCCCCCCCCCCOCC1CO1

Properties
Chemical formula	C_{48}H_{96}O_{6}
Molar mass	769.3 g/mol

Hazards
- GHS labelling
Pictograms	(GHS07: Exclamation mark)
Signal word	Warning
Hazard statements	H315, H317
Precautionary statements	P261, P264, P272, P280, P302+P352, P321, P332+P313, P333+P313, P362, P363, P501
- Except where otherwise noted, data are given for materials in their standard state (at 25 °C [77 °F], 100 kPa). Infobox references

C12–C14 alcohol glycidyl ether (AGE) is an organic chemical in the glycidyl ether family. It is a mixture of mainly 12 and 14 carbon chain alcohols, also called fatty alcohols that have been glycidated. It is an industrial chemical used as a surfactant but primarily for epoxy resin viscosity reduction. It has the CAS number 68609-97-2 but the IUPAC name is more complex as it is a mixture and is 2-(dodecoxymethyl)oxirane;2-(tetradecoxymethyl)oxirane;2-(tridecoxymethyl)oxirane. Other names include dodecyl and tetradecyl glycidyl ethers and alkyl (C12-C14) glycidyl ether.

== Manufacture ==
A fatty alcohol mixture rich in C12-C14 alcohols is placed in a reactor with a Lewis acid catalyst. Then epichlorohydrin is added slowly to control exotherm which results in the formation of the halohydrins. This is followed by a caustic dehydrochlorination, to form C12–C14 alcohol glycidyl ether. The waste products are water and sodium chloride and excess caustic soda. One of the quality control tests would involve measuring the Epoxy value by determination of the epoxy equivalent weight.

== Uses ==
As an epoxy modifier it is classed as an epoxy reactive diluent. It is one of a family of glycidyl ethers available used for viscosity reduction of epoxy resins. These are then further formulated into coatings, sealants, adhesives, and elastomers. Resins with this diluent tend to show improved workability. It is also used to synthesize other molecules. The use of the diluent does effect mechanical properties and microstructure of epoxy resins.

== Toxicology ==
The toxicology is well known, and it is classed as a skin irritant.

== See also ==
- Epoxide
- Glycidol

== External websites ==
- Denacol epoxy diluent range
- Reactive Diluents – Olin Epoxy
- Hexion Epoxy Functional Modifiers
- Cargill Reactive diluents
