= Iodine value =

Mass of iodine absorbed by 100 grams of a given substance

In chemistry, the iodine value (IV; also iodine absorption value, iodine number or iodine index) is the mass of iodine in grams that is consumed by 100 grams of a chemical substance. Iodine numbers are often used to determine the degree of unsaturation in fats, oils and waxes. In fatty acids, unsaturation occurs mainly as double bonds which are very reactive towards halogens, the iodine in this case. Thus, the higher the iodine value, the more unsaturations are present in the fat. It can be seen from the table that coconut oil is very saturated, which means it is good for making soap. On the other hand, linseed oil is highly unsaturated, which makes it a drying oil, well suited for making oil paints.

== Principle ==
An example of triglyceride occurring in the saponifiable fraction of oils with a saturated fatty acid residue, a monounsaturated fatty acid residue and a triple unsaturated (polyunsaturated) fatty acid residue. The triple esterified glycerol (marked black) can be seen in the center of the structure. Such a triglyceride has a high iodine value (approx. 119). Below, the reaction product after the addition of four equivalents of iodine or bromine to the four C=C double bonds of the unsaturated fatty acid residues.

The determination of iodine value is a particular example of iodometry. A solution of iodine I_{2} is yellow/brown in color. When this is added to a solution to be tested, however, any chemical group (usually in this test −C=C− double bonds) that react with iodine effectively reduce the strength, or magnitude of the color (by taking I_{2} out of solution). Thus the amount of iodine required to make a solution retain the characteristic yellow/brown color can effectively be used to determine the amount of iodine sensitive groups present in the solution.

The chemical reaction associated with this method of analysis involves formation of the diiodo alkane (R and R' symbolize alkyl or other organic groups):

$$\ce{R-CH=CH-R' + I2 -> R-CH(I)-CH(I)-R'}$$

The precursor alkene (RCH=CHR') is colorless and so is the organoiodine product (RCHI−CHIR').

In a typical procedure, the fatty acid is treated with an excess of the Hanuš or Wijs solution, which are, respectively, solutions of iodine monobromide (IBr) and iodine monochloride (ICl) in glacial acetic acid. Unreacted iodine monobromide (or monochloride) is then allowed to react with potassium iodide, converting it to iodine I_{2}, whose concentration can be determined by back-titration with sodium thiosulfate (Na_{2}S_{2}O_{3}) standard solution.

== Methods for the determination of iodine value ==
=== Hübl method ===
The basic principle of iodine value was originally introduced in 1884 by A. V. Hübl as "Jodzahl". He used iodine alcoholic solution in presence of mercuric chloride (HgCl_{2}) and carbon tetrachloride (CCl_{4}) as fat solubilizer. ^{[Note 1]} The residual iodine is titrated against sodium thiosulfate solution with starch used as endpoint indicator. This method is now considered as obsolete.

=== Wijs/Hanuš method ===
J. J. A. Wijs modified the Hübl method by using iodine monochloride (ICl) in glacial acetic acid, which became known as Wijs's solution, dropping the HgCl_{2} reagent. Alternatively, J. Hanuš used iodine monobromide (IBr), which is more stable than ICl when protected from light. Typically, fat is dissolved in chloroform ^{[Note 2]} and treated with excess ICl/IBr. Some of the halogen reacts with the double bonds in the unsaturated fat while the rest remains.

$$\ce{R-CH=CH-R' + \underset{(excess)}{ICl} -> R-CH(I)-CH(Cl)-R' + \underset{(remaining)}{ICl}}$$

Then, saturated solution of potassium iodide (KI) is added to this mixture, which reacts with remaining free ICl/IBr to form potassium chloride (KCl) and diiodide (I_{2}).

$$\ce{ICl + 2 KI -> KCl + KI + I2}$$

Afterward, the liberated I_{2} is titrated against sodium thiosulfate, in presence of starch, to indirectly determine the concentration of the reacted iodine.

$$\ce{I2{} + \underset{(blue)}{starch}{} + 2 Na2S2O3 -> 2 NaI{} + \underset{(colorless)}{starch}{} + Na2S4O6}$$

IV (g I/ 100 g) is calculated from the formula :

$$\textrm{IV} = \frac{(\textrm{B} - \textrm{S}) \times \textrm{N} \times 12.69}{\textrm{W}}$$
Where:
- (B – S) is the difference between the volumes, in mL, of sodium thiosulfate required for the blank and for the sample, respectively;
- N is the normality of sodium thiosulfate solution in Eq/ L;
- 12.69 is the conversion factor from mEq sodium thiosulfate to grams of iodine (the molecular weight of iodine is 126.9 g/mol);
- W is the weight of the sample in grams.

The determination of IV according to Wijs is the official method currently accepted by international standards such as DIN 53241-1:1995-05, AOCS Method Cd 1-25, EN 14111 and ISO 3961:2018. One of the major limitations of is that halogens does not react stoichiometrically with conjugated double bonds (particularly abundant in some drying oils). Therefore, Rosenmund-Kuhnhenn method makes more accurate measurement in this situation.

=== Kaufmann method ===
Proposed by H. P. Kaufmann in 1935, it consists in the bromination of the double bonds using an excess of bromine and anhydrous sodium bromide dissolved in methanol. The reaction involves the formation of a bromonium intermediate as follows:

Bromination of unsaturated fats

Then the unused bromine is reduced to bromide with iodide (I^{−}).

$$\ce{Br2 + 2 I- -> 2 Br-  + I2}$$

Now, the amount of iodine formed is determined by back-titration with sodium thiosulfate solution.

The reactions must be carried out in the dark, since the formation of bromine radicals is stimulated by light. This would lead to undesirable side reactions, and thus falsifying a result consumption of bromine.

For educational purposes, Simurdiak et al. (2016) suggested the use of pyridinium tribromide as bromination reagent which is more safer in chemistry class and reduces drastically the reaction time.

=== Rosenmund-Kuhnhenn method ===
This method is suitable for the determination of iodine value in conjugated systems (ASTM D1541). It has been observed that Wijs/ Hanuš method gives erratic values of IV for some sterols (i.e. cholesterol) and other unsaturated components of insaponifible fraction. The original method uses pyridine dibromide sulfate solution as halogenating agent and an incubation time of 5 min.

=== Other methods ===
Measurement of iodine value with the official method is time-consuming (incubation time of 30 min with Wijs solution) and uses hazardous reagents and solvents. Several non-wet methods have been proposed for determining the iodine value. For example, IV of pure fatty acids and acylglycerols can be theoretically calculated as follows:

$$\text{IV} =\frac{2 \times 126.92 \times \text{no. of double bonds} \times 100}{\text{molecular weight}}$$

Accordingly, the IVs of oleic, linoleic, and linolenic acids are respectively 90, 181, and 273. Therefore, the IV of the mixture can be approximated by the following equation :

$$\textrm{IV}_{\textrm{mixture}}=  \sum A_f \times \textrm{IV}_f$$
in which $A_f$ and $\text{IV}_f$ are, respectively, the amount (%) and the iodine value of each individual fatty acid f in the mixture.

For fats and oils, the IV of the mixture can be calculated from the fatty acid composition profile as determined by gas chromatography (AOAC Cd 1c-85; ISO 3961:2018). However this formula does not take into consideration the olefinic substances in the unsaponifiable fraction. Therefore, this method is not applicable for fish oils as they may contain appreciable amounts of squalene.

IV can be also predicted from near-infrared, FTIR and Raman spectroscopy data using the ratio between the intensities of ν(C=C) and ν(CH_{2}) bands. Further, high resolution proton-NMR can also provide accurate estimations of IV.

== Significance and limitations ==
Although modern analytical methods (such as GC) provides more detailed molecular information including unsaturation degree, the iodine value still widely considered as an important quality parameter for oils and fats. Moreover, IV generally indicates oxidative stability of the fats which directly depend on unsaturation amount. Such a parameter has a direct impact on the processing, the shelf-life and the suitable applications for fat-based products. It is also of a crucial interest for lubricants and fuel industries. In biodiesel specifications, the required limit for IV is 120 g I_{2}/100 g, according to standard EN 14214.

IV is extensively used to monitor the industrial processes of hydrogenation and frying. However it must be completed by additional analyses as it does not differentiate cis/trans isomers.

G. Knothe (2002) criticized the use of IV as oxidative stability specification for fats esterification products. He noticed that not only the number but the position of double bonds is involved in oxidation susceptibility. For instance, linolenic acid with two bis-allylic positions (at the carbons no. 11 and 14 between the double bonds Δ9, Δ12 and Δ15) is more prone to autoxidation than linoleic acid exhibiting one bis-allylic position (at C-11 between Δ9 and Δ12). Therefore, Knothe introduced alternative indices termed allylic position and bis-allylic position equivalents (APE and BAPE), which can be calculated directly from the integration resultas of chromatographic analysis.

== Iodine values of various oils and fats ==
Iodine value helps to classify oils according to the degree of unsaturation into drying oils, having IV > 150 (i.e. linseed, tung), semi-drying oils IV : 125 – 150 ( soybean, sunflower) and non-drying oils with IV < 125 (canola, olive, coconut). The IV ranges of several common oils and fats is provided by the table below.

Fat	Iodine value (gI/ 100g)
Beef tallow	42 – 48
Beeswax	7 – 16
Butter	25 – 42
Canola oil	110 – 126
Castor oil	81 – 91
Dehydrated castor oil (DCO)	127 - 140
Cocoa butter	32 – 40
Coconut oil	6 – 11
Cod liver oil	148 – 183
Corn oil	107 – 128
Cottonseed oil	100 – 115
Fish oil	190 – 205
Grape seed oil	94 – 157
Hazelnut oil	83 – 90
Jojoba oil	80 – 85
Kapok seed oil	86 – 110
Lard	52 – 68
Linseed oil	170 – 204
Olive oil	75 – 94
Oiticica oil	139 – 185
Palm kernel oil	14 – 21
Palm oil	49 – 55
Peanut oil	82 – 107
Pecan oil	77 – 106
Pistachio oil	86 – 98
Poppyseed oil	140 – 158
Rapeseed oil	94 – 120
Rice bran oil	99 – 108
Safflower oil	135 – 150
Sesame oil	100 – 120
Sunflower oil	110 – 145
Soybean oil	120 – 139
Tung oil	160 – 175
Walnut oil	132 – 162
Wheat germ oil	115 – 128

== Related methods of analysis ==
- Acid number
- Amine value
- Argentation chromatography
- Bromine number
- Epoxy value
- Hydroxyl value
- Peroxide value
- Saponification value

== Notes ==
The interaction between mercuric chloride and iodine chloride is supposed to produce the active agent of halogenation, the ICl as follows : HgCl_{2} + I_{2} → HgClI + ICl
Chloroform is replaced in modern protocols by less hazardous and more available solvents such as cyclohexane and 2,2,4-trimethylpentane (ASTM D5768).
