= Isophorone diamine =

Names
- IUPAC name 3-(Aminomethyl)-3,5,5-trimethylcyclohexan-1-amine
- Other names Isophorondiamine; IPDA

Identifiers
CAS Number	2855-13-2 (isomeric mixture)
3D model (JSmol)	Interactive image
ChEMBL	ChEMBL1876029
ChemSpider	16867
ECHA InfoCard	100.018.788
EC Number	220-666-8
PubChem CID	17857
UNII	X5WYA841BU
UN number	2289
CompTox Dashboard (EPA)	DTXSID6027503
- InChI: InChI=1S/C10H22N2/c1-9(2)4-8(12)5-10(3,6-9)7-11/h8H,4-7,11-12H2,1-3H3 Key: RNLHGQLZWXBQNY-UHFFFAOYSA-N
- SMILES: CC1(CC(CC(C1)(C)CN)N)C

Properties
Chemical formula	C_{10}H_{22}N_{2}
Molar mass	170.300 g·mol^{−1}
Appearance	Colourless liquid
Density	0.922
Melting point	10 °C (50 °F; 283 K)
Boiling point	247 °C (477 °F; 520 K)
Solubility in water	Very good
Refractive index (n_{D})	1.4880

Hazards
- GHS labelling
Pictograms	(GHS05: Corrosive) (GHS07: Exclamation mark)
Signal word	Danger
Hazard statements	H302, H312, H314, H317, H412
Precautionary statements	P260, P264, P270, P272, P273, P280, P301+P312, P301+P330+P331, P302+P352, P303+P361+P353, P304+P340, P305+P351+P338, P310, P312, P321, P322, P330, P333+P313, P363, P405, P501
Flash point	117°C
- Except where otherwise noted, data are given for materials in their standard state (at 25 °C [77 °F], 100 kPa). Infobox references

Isophorone diamine (usually shortened to IPDA) is a chemical compound and specifically a diamine with the formula (CH_{3})_{3}C_{6}H_{7}(NH_{2})(CH_{2}NH_{2}). It is a colorless liquid. It is a precursor to polymers and coatings.

== Production ==
It is usually produced as a mixture of the cis- and trans-isomers. It is produced by hydrocyanation of isophorone followed by reductive amination and hydrogenation of the nitrile.

== Uses ==
IPDA is used as a precursor in the manufacture of isophorone diisocyanate by phosgenation.

Like other diamines or amines in general, it is a curing agent for epoxy resins. When used in coatings applications the higher cost compared to other amines is justified by the enhanced UV stability and thus lower yellowing tendency. In the production of advanced composite materials, its higher cost compared to other amines is less critical as performance is the key criteria. Cycloaliphatic amines such as IPDA also are known to have lower yellowing tendency than other amines and are thus used in coatings applications where this feature is important for aesthetics. Although it is not the only cycloaliphatic amine used in epoxy flooring, it has the largest use by volume. Other cycloaliphatic amines used in flooring include 1,3-BAC, MXDA, PACM and DCH-99.

In laboratory tests, Tokyo Metropolitan University found that IPDA was able to remove more than 99 percent of CO_{2} from air with a concentration of 400 parts per million (ppm) – about the level currently in the atmosphere. This process also happened much faster than other carbon capture techniques, removing 201 millimoles of CO_{2} per hour, per mole of the compound. That is at least twice as fast as other Direct Air Capture lab systems, and far faster than the leading artificial leaf device.

The pollutant separated out into flakes of a solid carbamic acid material, which could be removed from the liquid relatively easily. If need be, it can be converted back into gaseous CO_{2} by heating it to 60 °C (140 °F), which also releases the original liquid IPDA ready for reuse. Whether the carbon is kept as a solid or a gas, it can then be stored or reused in industrial or chemical processes. The research was published in the journal ACS Environmental Au.

== See also ==
- DCH-99
- Epoxy
- 1,3-BAC
- MXDA
- PACM
