= 1,3-Bis(aminomethyl)cyclohexane =

Names
- Preferred IUPAC name 1,1′-(Cyclohexane-1,3-diyl)di(methanamine)

Identifiers
CAS Number	2579-20-6
3D model (JSmol)	Interactive image
Beilstein Reference	2071397
ChEMBL	ChEMBL3186877
ChemSpider	16469
ECHA InfoCard	100.018.129
EC Number	219-941-5
PubChem CID	17406
UNII	VR58242KKB
CompTox Dashboard (EPA)	DTXSID4041238
- InChI: InChI=1S/C8H18N2/c9-5-7-2-1-3-8(4-7)6-10/h7-8H,1-6,9-10H2/t7-,8+ Key: QLBRROYTTDFLDX-OCAPTIKFSA-N
- SMILES: C1CC(CC(C1)CN)CN

Properties
Chemical formula	C_{8}H_{18}N_{2}
Molar mass	142.246 g·mol^{−1}

Hazards
- GHS labelling
Pictograms	(GHS05: Corrosive) (GHS07: Exclamation mark)
Signal word	Danger
Hazard statements	H302, H312, H314, H317, H332, H412
Precautionary statements	P260, P264, P270, P271, P272, P273, P280, P301+P312, P301+P330+P331, P302+P352, P303+P361+P353, P304+P312, P304+P340, P305+P351+P338, P310, P312, P321, P322, P330, P333+P313, P363, P405, P501
- Except where otherwise noted, data are given for materials in their standard state (at 25 °C [77 °F], 100 kPa). Infobox references

1,3-bis(aminomethyl)cyclohexane (1,3-BAC) are a collection of organic compounds with the formula C_{6}H_{10}(CH_{2}NH_{2})_{2}. The compounds belong to the sub class cycloaliphatic amine. Their key use is as an epoxy resin curing agent.

== Manufacture ==
It has been produced commercially as part of a mixture with the 1,4 derivative. The primary route of manufacture is by catalytic hydrogenation of m-xylylenediamine usually called MXDA.

== Uses ==
Like most amines it maybe used as an epoxy curing agent. However, the presence of the amino group also means it can be used in polyurethane chemistry by reacting with isocyanates. In this case a polyurea would be produced. It may also be reacted with phosgene (phosgenation) to produce an isocyanate.

== Safety ==
It is corrosive with a Packing Group I designation.

== See also ==
- DCH-99
- Epoxy
- IPDA
- MXDA
- PACM
