= Acid value =

Milligrams of a base needed to neutralize 1 gram of a given acid

In chemistry, acid value (AV, acid number, neutralization number or acidity) is a number used to quantify the acidity of a given chemical substance. It is the quantity of base (usually potassium hydroxide (KOH)), expressed as milligrams of KOH required to neutralize the acidic constituents in 1 gram of a sample. The acid value measures the acidity of water-insoluble substances like oils, fats, waxes and resins, which do not have a pH value.

The acid number is a measure of the number of carboxylic acid groups (−C(=O)OH) in a chemical compound, such as a fatty acid, or in a mixture of compounds. In other words, it is a measure of free fatty acids (FFAs) present in a substance. In a typical procedure, a known amount of sample dissolved in an organic solvent (often isopropanol) and titrated with a solution of alcoholic potassium hydroxide (KOH) of known concentration using phenolphthalein as a colour indicator. The acid number for an oil sample is indicative of the age of the oil and can be used to determine when the oil must be changed.

A liquid fat sample combined with neutralized 95% ethanol is titrated with standardized sodium hydroxide of 0.1 eq/L normality to a phenolphthalein endpoint. The volume and normality of the sodium hydroxide are used, along with the weight of the sample, to calculate the free fatty acid value.

Acid value is usually measured as milligrams of KOH per gram of sample (mg KOH/g fat/oil), or grams of KOH per gram of sample (g KOH/g fat/oil).

== Calculations ==
For example, for analysis of crude oil:

$$AV=(V_{eq}-b_{eq})N\frac{\text{56.1 g/mol}}{W_\text{oil}}$$

Where KOH is the titrant, wherease crude oil is the titrand.
V_{eq} is the volume of titrant (ml) consumed by the crude oil sample and 1 ml of spiking solution at the equivalent point,
b_{eq} is the volume of titrant (ml) consumed by 1 ml of spiking solution at the equivalent point,
56.1 g/mol is the molecular weight of KOH,
W_{oil} is the mass of the sample in grams.

The normality (N) of titrant is calculated as:

$$N = \frac{1000 \times W_\text{KHP}}{\text{204.23 g/mol } \times V_{eq}}$$

Where W_{KHP} is the mass (g) of potassium hydrogen phthalate (KHP) in 50 ml of KHP standard solution,
V_{eq} is the volume of titrant (ml) consumed by 50 ml KHP standard solution at the equivalent point,
204.23 g/mol is the molecular weight of KHP.

== Applications ==
An increment in the amount of FFAs in a fat or oil sample indicates hydrolysis of triglycerides. Such reaction occurs by the action of lipase enzyme and it is an indicator of inadequate processing and storage conditions. The source of the enzyme can be the tissue from which the oil or fat was extracted or it can be a contaminant from other cells including microorganisms.

For determining the acid value of mineral oils and biodiesel, there are standard methods such as ASTM D 974 and DIN 51558, and especially for biodiesel the European Standard EN 14104 and ASTM D664 are both widely used worldwide. Acid value of biodiesel should be lower than 0.50 mg KOH/g in both EN 14214 and ASTM D6751 standard fuels. This is because the FFAs produced can corrode automotive parts, hence these limits protect vehicle engines and fuel tanks.

Low acid value indicates good cleansing by soap.

When oils and fats become rancid, triglycerides are converted into fatty acids and glycerol, causing an increase in acid value. A similar situation is observed during aging of biodiesel through analogous oxidation and when subjected to prolonged high temperatures (ester thermolysis) or through exposure to acids or bases (acid/base ester hydrolysis).

Transesterification of waste cooking oil, having high acid value and high water content, can be performed using heteropolyacids such as dodecatungstophosphoric acid (PW12) as a catalyst.

In 2007, Sahoo et al. made biodiesel consisting of mono-esters of polanga oil extract of the plant Calophyllum inophyllum produced by triple stage transesterification and blended with high speed diesel, which was then tested for its use as a diesel substitute in a single cylinder diesel engine.

== Testing ==
Total acidity, fatty acid profiles, and free fatty acids (FFAs) can be determined for oils such as sunflower and soybean oils obtained by green processes involving supercritical carbon dioxide (scCO_{2}) and pressurized liquid extraction (PLE). The identification and separation of the primary fatty acids responsible for acidity can ensure higher quality of fat and oil products.

In 2020, Dallas Group of America (DGA) and American Oil Chemists' Society (AOCS) devised a standard method (5a-40) for testing free fatty acid in cooking oils. The DGA has produced a simplified test kit based on the 5a-40 test method.

== Acid values of various fats and oils ==
Fat / oil	Acid value (mg KOH per g sample)
Beeswax	17 – 36
Canola oil	0.071 – 0.073
Maize oil	0.223 – 0.224
Soyabean oil	0.60 – 0.61
Virgin olive oil	0.8 – 2
Used frying oil	0.1 – 2.5

== See also ==
- Amine value – Measure of an organic compound's nitrogen content
- Bromine number – Mass of bromine absorbed by 100 grams of a given substance
- Epoxy value – Measure of the epoxy content of a substance
- Ester value – Determination of the amount of ester present in fats and oils
- Hydroxyl value – Mass of KOH needed to neutralize 1 gram of acetylized substance
- Iodine value – Mass of iodine absorbed by 100 grams of a given substance
- Peroxide value – Measure of peroxide content of a fat or oil
- Saponification value – Milligrams of a base required to saponify 1g of fat
- Redox – Chemical reaction involving changes in oxidation state
- EN 14214 – Fuel standard for biodiesel
- Rancidification – Autoxidation or hydrolysis of fats and oils
