= Oiticica oil =

Chemical structure of α-licanic acid, the major keto polyunsaturated fatty acid found in Microdesmia rigida oil.

Oiticica oil is a light-yellowish oil obtained from the seeds of oiticica tree (Microdesmia rigida) which grows mainly in Brazil.

== Extraction and appearance ==
Oiticica oil is generally obtained from the kernels by crushing, pressing and expelling at high temperatures (210-220 °C) to prevent its polymerization. The raw oil is yellowish, turning brown after oxidation. It has also an unpleasant smell and taste, which limits its use in food and cosmetics applications.

== Usage ==
Oiticica oil is used in industrial oil paints and varnishes as a substitute for tung oil, either alone or mixed with linseed oil and sesame oil to achieve even better results.

== Composition ==
The fat components of oiticica oil are polyunsaturated α-licanic acid (46 – 78% of total), saturated fat mainly palmitic and stearic acids (together, 11%), monounsaturated as oleic acid (4 – 12%).
