= Degree of unsaturation =

Term which determines total number of rings and π bonds

In the analysis of the molecular formula of organic molecules, the degree of unsaturation (DU) (also known as the index of hydrogen deficiency (IHD), double bond equivalents (DBE), or unsaturation index) is a calculation that determines the total number of rings and π bonds. A formula is used in organic chemistry to help draw chemical structures. It does not give any information about those components individually—the specific number of rings, or of double bonds (one π bond each), or of triple bonds (two π bonds each). The final structure is verified with use of NMR, mass spectrometry and IR spectroscopy, as well as qualitative inspection. It is based on comparing the actual molecular formula to what would be a possible formula if the structure were saturated—having no rings and containing only σ bonds—with all atoms having their standard valence.

== General formula ==
The formula for degree of unsaturation is:

$$\mathrm{DU} = {\sum n_i(v_i-2)\over 2} + 1$$

where n_{i} is the number of atoms with valence v_{i}.

That is, an atom that has a valence of x contributes a total of x − 2 to the degree of unsaturation. The result is then halved and increased by 1.

== Simplified formulae ==
For certain classes of molecules, the general formula can be simplified or rewritten more clearly. For example:

$$\text{Double bond equivalent} =(a+1) - \frac{b-c+f}{2}$$

where

a = number of carbon atoms in the compound
b = number of hydrogen atoms in the compound
c = number of nitrogen atoms in the compound
f = number of halogen atoms in the compound

or

$$\mathrm{rings + \pi\ bonds} = C - \frac{H}{2} - \frac{X}{2} + \frac{N}{2}+1\,$$

where C = number of carbons, H = number of hydrogens, X = number of halogens and N = number of nitrogens, gives an equivalent result.

In either case, oxygen and other divalent atoms do not contribute to the degree of unsaturation, as 2 − 2 = 0.

== Explanation ==
For hydrocarbons, the DBE (or IHD) tells us the number of rings and/or extra bonds in a non-saturated structure, which equals the number of hydrogen pairs that are required to make the structure saturated, simply because joining two elements to form a ring or adding one extra bond (e.g., a single bond changed to a double bond) in a structure reduces the need for two H's. For non-hydrocarbons, the elements in a pair can include any elements in the lithium family and the fluorine family in the periodic table, not necessarily all H's.

A popular form of the formula is as follows:

$$\text{IHD} = C + 1 + \frac{N}{2} - \frac{H}{2} - \frac{X}{2}$$

where C, N, H and X represent the number of carbon, nitrogen, hydrogen and halogen atoms, respectively. Each of the terms on the RHS can be explained, respectively, as follows:

- Except for the terminal carbons, every carbon chained to the structure with two single bonds requires a pair of hydrogen atoms attached to it. The number of carbons in the formula actually represents the number of hydrogen pairs required for that number of carbons to form a saturated structure. (This is also true if a carbon is added to the structure, whether it is inserted into a backbone chain, attached to a terminal to replace a hydrogen, or branched out from a carbon to replace a hydrogen.)
- Each of the two terminal carbons in the backbone chain needs one extra hydrogen – that is why "1" is added to the formula. (A branch's terminal doesn't need an H added in the calculation because the H replaced by the branch can be counted as the H added to the branch terminal. This is also true for a branch terminated with any element.)
- Except the terminal nitrogens, each nitrogen in the chain only requires one H attached to it, which is half a pair of hydrogens—that is why + N/2 is in the formula, which gives a value of 1 for every two nitrogens. (This is also true if nitrogen is added into the structure, whether it is inserted into a backbone chain, attached to a terminal to replace an H, or branched out from a C to replace an H.)
- The H/2 represents the number of hydrogen pairs because it gives a value of 1 for every two hydrogen atoms. It is subtracted in the formula to count how many pairs of hydrogen atoms are missing in the unsaturated structure, which tells us the degree of hydrogen deficiency. (No hydrogen pair is missing if IHD = 0, which corresponds to no hydrogen deficiency.)
- The presence of X/2 is for a reason similar to H/2.

Adding an oxygen atom to the structure requires no hydrogen added, which is why the number of oxygen atoms does not appear in the formula. Furthermore, the formula can be generalised to include all elements of Group I (the hydrogen and lithium family), Group IV (the carbon family), Group V (the nitrogen family) and Group VII (the fluorine family) of CAS A group in the periodic table as follows:

$$\text{IHD} = G_4 + 1 + \frac{G_5}{2} - \frac{G_1}{2} - \frac{G_7}{2}$$

Or simply,

$$\text{IHD} = G_4 + 1 + \frac{G_5 - G_1 - G_7}{2}$$

== See also ==
- Iodine number - practical measure of number of double bonds in a sample
