= Equivalent (chemistry) =

Amount of substance needed to fully react with a given amount of another

An equivalent (symbol: officially equiv; unofficially but often Eq) is the amount of a substance that reacts with (or is equivalent to) an arbitrary amount (typically one mole) of another substance in a given chemical reaction. It is an archaic quantity that was used in chemistry and the biological sciences (see Equivalent weight § In history). The mass of an equivalent is called its equivalent weight.

== Formula ==
The formula from milligrams (mg) to milli-equivalent (mEq) and back is as follows:
$$\begin{align}
\text{mg} \to \text{mEq} &: \quad \text{mg } \times \frac{V}{MW} \\[4pt]
\text{mEq} \to \text{mg} &: \quad \text{mEq } \times \frac{MW}{V}
\end{align}$$
where V is the valence and MW is the molecular weight.

For elemental compounds:
$$\text{mg} \to \text{mEq} : \quad \frac{\text{element mass [mg]}}{\text{mass fraction}} \times \frac{V}{MW}$$

=== Common examples ===
==== mEq to milligram ====
Compound	Chemical formula	Molecular weight (MW)	Valencies (V)	Sample		
Compound	Chemical formula	Molecular weight (MW)	Valencies (V)	Reference	Elemental mEq	Elemental mEq to compound weight
Potassium (reference)	K	39.098 g/mol	1 (K^{+})		20 mEq potassium	20*39.098/1=782 mg
Potassium citrate monohydrate	C_{6}H_{7}K_{3}O_{8}	324.41 g/mol	3 (K^{+})	Liquid potassium citrate/gluconate therapy for adults and teenagers taken two to four times a day	20 mEq potassium	20*324/3=2160 mg
Potassium gluconate (anhydrous)	C_{6}H_{11}KO_{7}	234.245 g/mol	1 (K^{+})	Liquid potassium citrate/gluconate therapy for adults and teenagers taken two to four times a day	20 mEq potassium	20*234.245/1=4685 mg

==== Milligram to mEq ====
Compound	Chemical formula	Molecular weight (MW)	Elemental mass fraction	Valencies (V)	Sample		
Compound	Chemical formula	Molecular weight (MW)	Elemental mass fraction	Valencies (V)	Reference	Weight	Compound weight to elemental mEq
Potassium (reference)	K	39.098 g/mol	100%	1 (K^{+})		3000 mg	3000*1/39.098=77 mEq K^{+}
Potassium citrate monohydrate	C_{6}H_{7}K_{3}O_{8}	324.41 g/mol	36.16%	3 (K^{+})	Tolerable DRI for potassium dietary supplements	8.3 g (3000/0.3616)	8296*3/324.41=77 mEq K^{+}
Potassium gluconate (anhydrous)	C_{6}H_{11}KO_{7}	234.245 g/mol	16.69%	1 (K^{+})	Tolerable DRI for potassium dietary supplements	18 g (3000/0.1669)	17975*1/234.245=77 mEq K^{+}

== Formal definition ==
In a more formal definition, the equivalent is the amount of a substance needed to do one of the following:

- react with or supply one mole of hydrogen ions (H^{+}) in an acid–base reaction
- react with or supply one mole of electrons in a redox reaction.

The "hydrogen ion" and the "electron" in these examples are respectively called the "reaction units."

By this definition, the number of equivalents of a given ion in a solution is equal to the number of moles of that ion multiplied by its valence. For example, consider a solution of 1 mole of NaCl and 1 mole of CaCl_{2}. The solution has 1 mole or 1 equiv Na^{+}, 1 mole or 2 equiv Ca^{2+}, and 3 mole or 3 equiv Cl^{−}.

An earlier definition, used especially for chemical elements, holds that an equivalent is the amount of a substance that will react with 1 g (0.035 oz) of hydrogen, 8 g (0.28 oz) of oxygen, or 35.5 g (1.25 oz) of chlorine—or that will displace any of the three.

== In medicine and biochemistry ==
In biological systems, reactions often happen on small scales, involving small amounts of substances, so those substances are routinely described in terms of milliequivalents (symbol: officially mequiv; unofficially but often mEq or meq), the prefix milli- denoting a factor of one thousandth (10^{−3}). Very often, the measure is used in terms of milliequivalents of solute per litre of solution (or milliNormal, where meq/L = mN). This is especially common for measurement of compounds in biological fluids; for instance, the healthy level of potassium in the blood of a human is defined between 3.5 and 5.0 mEq/L.

A certain amount of univalent ions provides the same amount of equivalents while the same amount of divalent ions provides twice the amount of equivalents. For example, 1 mmol (0.001 mol) of Na^{+} is equal to 1 meq, while 1 mmol of Ca^{2+} is equal to 2 meq.
