= 1,2-Diaminocyclohexane =

Names
- Preferred IUPAC name Cyclohexane-1,2-diamine

Identifiers
CAS Number	694-83-7
3D model (JSmol)	Interactive image
ChEBI	CHEBI:93778
ChEMBL	ChEMBL1356279
ChemSpider	4449
ECHA InfoCard	100.010.707
EC Number	211-776-7
PubChem CID	4610
UNII	C82TX76BHH
UN number	2735
CompTox Dashboard (EPA)	DTXSID0027301
- InChI: InChI=1S/C6H14N2/c7-5-3-1-2-4-6(5)8/h5-6H,1-4,7-8H2 Key: SSJXIUAHEKJCMH-UHFFFAOYSA-N
- SMILES: C1CCC(C(C1)N)N

Properties
Chemical formula	C_{6}H_{14}N_{2}
Molar mass	114.192 g·mol^{−1}

Hazards
- GHS labelling
Pictograms	(GHS05: Corrosive) (GHS07: Exclamation mark)
Signal word	Danger
Hazard statements	H302, H302+H312+H332, H312, H314, H317, H332, H335
Precautionary statements	P260, P264, P264+P265, P270, P271, P272, P280, P301+P317, P301+P330+P331, P302+P352, P302+P361+P354, P304+P340, P305+P354+P338, P316, P317, P319, P321, P330, P333+P317, P362+P364, P363, P403+P233, P405, P501
- Except where otherwise noted, data are given for materials in their standard state (at 25 °C [77 °F], 100 kPa). Infobox references

1,2-Diaminocyclohexane (DACH) is an organic compound with the formula (CH_{2})_{4}(CHNH_{2})_{2}. It is a mixture of three stereoisomers: cis-1,2-diaminocyclohexane and both enantiomers of trans-1,2-diaminocyclohexane. The mixture is a colorless, corrosive liquid, although older samples can appear yellow. It is often called DCH-99 and also DACH.

== Manufacture ==
The product is available commercially, manufactured by the hydrogenation of o-phenylenediamine. The two trans enantiomers can be resolved by conversion to diastereomeric salts of various chiral acids.

== Uses ==
The product is an epoxy curing agent for use in Coatings, Adhesives, Sealants and Elastomers - CASE. It is particularly useful in epoxy flooring. It may also be reacted with diethyl maleate utilizing the Michael reaction to produce a polyaspartic compound of CAS number 481040-92-0. It may also be used in lubricants. The product is also advertised as being useful as a chelating agent in a variety of applications including oil production. It also is used in downfield oil and gas wells where there is an acidic stream to prevent corrosion to the bore piles.

== See also ==
- Hexamethylenediamine
- Isophorone diamine
- 1,3-BAC
- 2,3-Butanediamine, a vicinal diamine that also exists as three stereoisomers
