= Hexamethylenediamine =

Chemical compound H2N(CH2)6NH2

- Skeletal formula of hexamethylenediamine

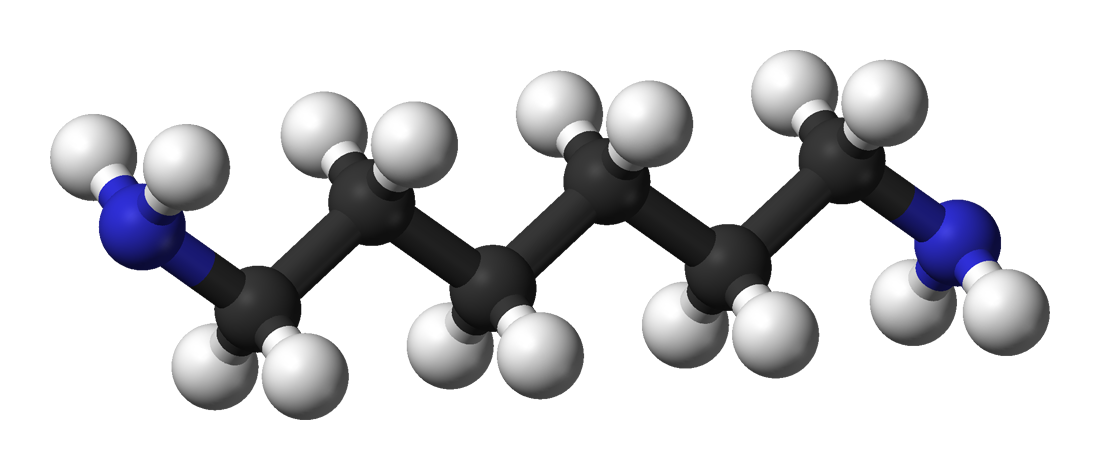
- Ball and stick model of hexamethylenediamine

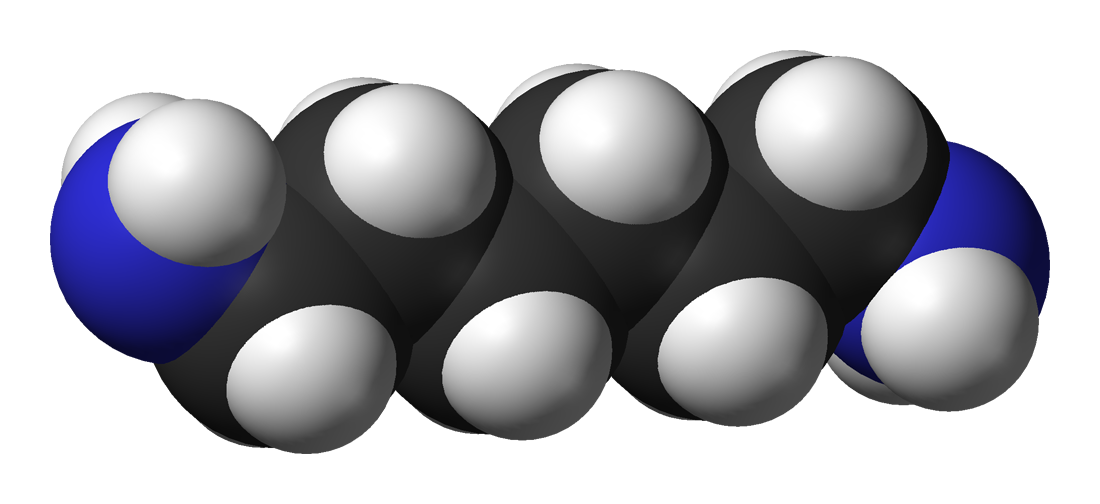
- Spacefill model of hexamethylenediamine

Names
- Preferred IUPAC name Hexane-1,6-diamine
- Other names: 1,6-Diaminohexane; 1,6-Hexanediamine

Identifiers
CAS Number	124-09-4
3D model (JSmol)	Interactive image
Beilstein Reference	1098307
ChEBI	CHEBI:39618
ChEMBL	ChEMBL303004
ChemSpider	13835579
DrugBank	DB03260
ECHA InfoCard	100.004.255
EC Number	204-679-6
Gmelin Reference	2578
MeSH	1,6-diaminohexane
PubChem CID	16402
RTECS number	MO1180000
UNII	ZRA5J5B2QW
UN number	2280
CompTox Dashboard (EPA)	DTXSID5024922
- InChI: InChI=1S/C6H16N2/c7-5-3-1-2-4-6-8/h1-8H2 Key: NAQMVNRVTILPCV-UHFFFAOYSA-N
- SMILES: NCCCCCCN

Properties
Chemical formula	C_{6}H_{16}N_{2}
Molar mass	116.208 g·mol^{−1}
Appearance	Colourless crystals
Density	0.84 g/mL
Melting point	39 to 42 °C (102 to 108 °F; 312 to 315 K)
Boiling point	204.6 °C; 400.2 °F; 477.7 K
Solubility in water	490 g L^{−1}
log P	0.386

Thermochemistry
Std enthalpy of formation (Δ_{f}H^{⦵}_{298})	−205 kJ mol^{−1}

Hazards
- GHS labelling
Pictograms	(GHS05: Corrosive) (GHS07: Exclamation mark)
Signal word	Danger
Hazard statements	H302, H312, H314, H335
Precautionary statements	P261, P280, P305+P351+P338, P310
NFPA 704 (fire diamond)	3 2 0
Flash point	80 °C (176 °F; 353 K)
Explosive limits	0.7–6.3%
- Lethal dose or concentration (LD, LC)
LD_{50} (median dose)	750 mg kg^{−1} (oral, rat); 1.11 g kg^{−1} (dermal, rabbit)

Related compounds
Related alkanamines	Pentylamine; Cadaverine; Methylhexanamine; Tuaminoheptane
- Except where otherwise noted, data are given for materials in their standard state (at 25 °C [77 °F], 100 kPa). verify (what is ?) Infobox references

Hexamethylenediamine or hexane-1,6-diamine, is the organic compound with the formula H_{2}N(CH_{2})_{6}NH_{2}. The molecule is a diamine, consisting of a hexamethylene hydrocarbon chain terminated with amine functional groups. The colorless solid (yellowish for some commercial samples) has a strong amine odor.

== Synthesis ==
Hexamethylenediamine was first reported by Theodor Curtius. It is produced by the hydrogenation of adiponitrile:

NC(CH_{2})_{4}CN + 4 H_{2} → H_{2}N(CH_{2})_{6}NH_{2}

The hydrogenation is conducted on molten adiponitrile diluted with ammonia, typical catalysts being based on cobalt and iron. The yield is good, but commercially significant side products are generated by virtue of reactivity of partially hydrogenated intermediates. These other products include 1,2-diaminocyclohexane, hexamethyleneimine, and the triamine bis(hexamethylenetriamine).

An alternative process uses Raney nickel as the catalyst and adiponitrile that is diluted with hexamethylenediamine itself (as the solvent). This process operates without ammonia and at lower pressure and temperature.

== Applications ==
Hexamethylenediamine is used almost exclusively for the production of polymers, an application that takes advantage of its structure. It is difunctional in terms of the amine groups and tetra functional with respect to the amine hydrogens. The great majority of the diamine is consumed by the production of nylon 66 via condensation with adipic acid. Otherwise hexamethylene diisocyanate (HDI) is generated from this diamine by phosgenation as a monomer feedstock in the production of polyurethane. The diamine also serves as a cross-linking agent in epoxy resins.

Hexamethylenediamine is involved in the synthesis of Chlorhexidine.

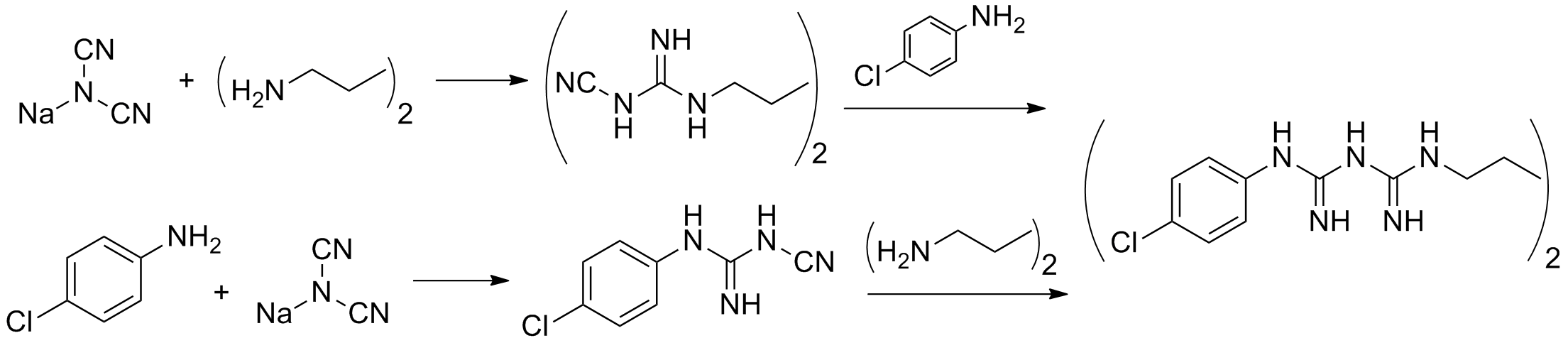
Two routes for chlorhexidine synthesis: U.S. patent 2,684,924 (1954 to I.C.I.). The compounds designated (...)_{2} are substituted hexanes.

== Safety ==
Hexamethylenediamine is moderately toxic, with LD_{50} of 792–1127 mg/kg. Nonetheless, like other basic amines, it can cause serious burns and severe irritation. Such injuries were observed in the accident at the BASF site in Seal Sands, near Billingham (UK) on 4 January 2007 in which 37 persons were injured, one of them seriously.

== See also ==
- 1,2-Diaminocyclohexane
- 2-Methylpentamethylenediamine
