= EN 14214 =

Fuel standard for biodiesel

EN 14214 is a standard published by the European Committee for Standardization that describes the requirements and test methods for FAME - the most common type of biodiesel.

The technical definition of biodiesel is a fuel suitable for use in compression ignition (diesel) engines that is made of fatty acid monoalkyl esters derived from biologically produced oils or fats including vegetable oils, animal fats and microalgal oils. When biodiesel is produced from these types of oil using methanol fatty acid methyl esters (FAME) are produced. Biodiesel fuels can also be produced using other alcohols, for example using ethanol to produce fatty acid ethyl esters, however these types of biodiesel are not covered by EN 14214 which applies only to methyl esters i.e. biodiesel produced using methanol.

This European Standard exists in three official versions - English, French, German. The current version of the standard was published in November 2008 and supersedes EN 14214:2003.

Differences exist between the national versions of the EN 14214 standard. These differences relate to cold weather requirements and are detailed in the national annex of each standard.

It is broadly based on the earlier German standard DIN 51606. The ASTM and EN standards both recommend very similar methods for the GC based analyses.

Blends are designated as "B" followed by a number indicating the percentage biodiesel. For example: B100 is pure biodiesel. B99 is 99% biodiesel, 1% petrodiesel. B20 is 20% biodiesel and 80% fossil diesel.

== Specifications ==
Property	Units	lower limit	upper limit	Test Method
Ester content	% (m/m)	96.5	-	-
Density at 15°C	kg/m³	860	900	EN ISO 3675 / EN ISO 12185 / EN12185.
Viscosity at 40°C	mm²/s	3.5	5.0	EN ISO 3104 / EN 14105
Flash point	°C	> 120	-	EN ISO 2719 / EN ISO 3679.
Sulfur content	mg/kg	-	10	EN ISO 20846 / EN ISO 20884.
Cetane number	-	51,0	-	EN ISO 5165
Sulfated ash content	% (m/m)	-	0,02	ISO 3987
Water content	mg/kg	-	500	EN ISO 12937
Total contamination	mg/kg	-	24	EN 12662
Copper band corrosion (3 hours at 50 °C)	rating	Class 1	Class 1	EN ISO 2160
Oxidation stability, 110°C	hours	8	-	EN 14112
Acid value	mg KOH/g	-	0,5	EN 14104
Iodine value	-	-	120	EN 14111
Linolenic Acid Methylester	% (m/m)	-	12	EN 14103
Polyunsaturated (>= 4 Double bonds) Methylester	% (m/m)	-	1	EN 14103
Methanol content	% (m/m)	-	0,2	EN 14110
Monoglyceride content	% (m/m)	-	0,7	EN 14105
Diglyceride content	% (m/m)	-	0,2	EN 14105
Triglyceride content	% (m/m)	-	0,2	EN 14105
Free Glycerine	% (m/m)	-	0,02	EN 14105 / EN 14106
Total Glycerine	% (m/m)	-	0,25	EN 14105
Group I metals (Na+K)	mg/kg	-	5	EN 14108 / EN 14109 / EN 14538
Group II metals (Ca+Mg)	mg/kg	-	5	EN 14538
Phosphorus content	mg/kg	-	4	EN14107

== See also ==
- ASTM D6751 — the standard used in USA and Canada
- EN
- EN 590
- List of EN standards
