= Equivalent concentration =

Molar concentration divided by equivalence factor

In chemistry, equivalent concentration or normality (N) is the number of equivalents of solute (eq) per liter of solution (L).
$$N = \frac{eq}{L}$$
In contrast to molarity, normality uses the concept of equivalence. Molar can be converted to normality by multiplying Molar concentration by an equivalence factor or n-factor (f_{eq}).
$$N = M*{f_{\rm eq}}$$

== Definition ==
Normality is defined as the number of gram or mole equivalents of solute present in one liter of solution. The SI unit of normality is equivalents per liter (Eq/L).

$$N = \frac{m_{\rm sol}}{EW_{\rm sol} \times V_{\rm soln}}$$
where N is normality, m_{sol} is the mass of solute in grams, EW_{sol} is the equivalent weight of solute, and V_{soln} is the volume of the entire solution in liters.

== Usage ==
There are three common types of chemical reaction where normality is used as a measure of reactive species in solution:

- In acid-base chemistry, normality is used to express the concentration of hydronium ions (H_{3}O^{+}) or hydroxide ions (OH^{−}) in a solution. Here, 1/f_{eq} is an integer value. Each solute can produce one or more equivalents of reactive species when dissolved.
- In redox reactions, the equivalence factor describes the number of electrons that an oxidizing or reducing agent can accept or donate. Here, 1/f_{eq} can have a fractional (non-integer) value.
- In precipitation reactions, the equivalence factor measures the number of ions which will precipitate in a given reaction. Here, 1/f_{eq} is an integer value.

Normal concentration of an ionic solution is also related to conductivity (electrolytic) through the use of equivalent conductivity.

=== Medical ===
Although losing favor in the medical industry, reporting of serum concentrations in units of "eq/L" (= 1 N) or "meq/L" (= 0.001 N) still occurs.

== Examples ==
Normality can be used for acid-base titrations. For example, sulfuric acid (H_{2}SO_{4}) is a diprotic acid. Since only 0.5 mol of H_{2}SO_{4} are needed to neutralize 1 mol of OH^{−}, the equivalence factor is:

f_{eq}(H_{2}SO_{4}) = 2

If the concentration of a sulfuric acid solution is c(H_{2}SO_{4}) = 1 mol/L, then its normality is 2 N. It can also be called a "2 normal" solution.

Similarly, for a solution with c(H_{3}PO_{4}) = 1 mol/L, the normality is 3 N because phosphoric acid contains 3 acidic H atoms.

== Criticism of the term "normality" ==
The normality of a solution depends on the equivalence factor f_{eq} for a particular reaction, which presents two possible sources of ambiguity – namely, f_{eq} depends on the choice of reaction as well as which chemical species of the reaction is being discussed (e.g., acid/base species, redox species, precipitating salts, isotopes exchanged, etc.). That is to say, the same solution can possess different normalities for different reactions or potentially even the same reaction in a different context.

To avoid ambiguity, IUPAC and NIST discourage the use of the terms "normality" and "normal solution".

== See also ==
- Equivalent (chemistry)
- Normal saline, a solution of NaCl, but not a normal solution. Its normality is about 0.154 N.
