= Epoxy value =

Measure of the epoxy content of a substance

Epoxy value derives from the Epoxy equivalent weight (EEW) or Weight Per Epoxide (WPE) and is a measure of the epoxy content of an epoxy resin or epoxy reactive diluent, or glycidyl ether. This is an important parameter as it allows determination of the correct mix ratio of an epoxy system with a curing agent. The epoxide equivalent weight is usually measured first and done by titration. The standard test method is ASTM D1652 though this has been modified by certain states of the USA. The epoxy equivalent weight (EEW) may be defined as: the number of grams of epoxy resin required to give 1 mole of epoxy groups. The epoxy value is defined as the number of moles of epoxy group per 100g resin.

== Example calculations ==
Polyoxypropylene diglycidyl ether, a reactive diluent with the trade name of Diluent F, has an average molecular weight of 1000 and a functionality of 2 so the EEW is 1000/2 = 500. The epoxy value is defined as the number of moles of epoxy group per 100g resin. So as an example using an epoxy resin with molar mass of 382 and that has 2 moles of epoxy groups per mole of resin, the EEW = 382/2 = 191, and the epoxy value is calculated as follows: 100/191 = 0.53 (i.e. the epoxy value of the resin is 0.53).

== Alternative techniques ==
There are methods using instruments that do not use traditional titration techniques to determine epoxide equivalent weights.

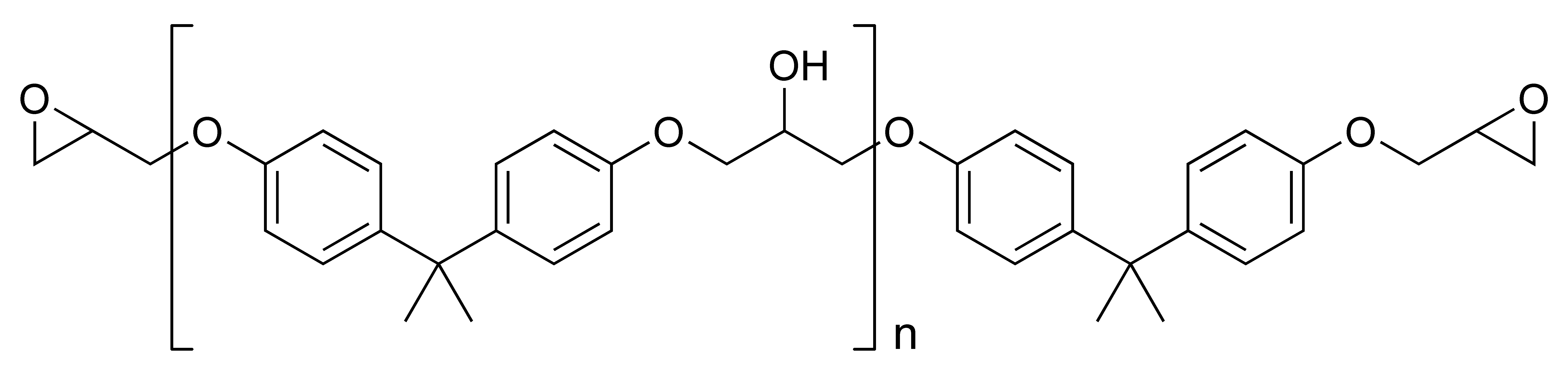
Structure of bisphenol-A diglycidyl ether epoxy resin: n denotes the number of polymerized subunits and is typically in the range from 0 to 25

== See also-related test methods ==
- Acid value
- Amine value
- Hydroxyl value
- Iodine value
- Peroxide value
- Saponification value
