= M-Xylylenediamine =

m-Xylylenediamine

Names
- Preferred IUPAC name 1,1′-(1,3-Phenylene)di(methanamine)
- Other names m-Xylene-α,α'-diamine; 1,3-Benzenedimethanamine; MXDA m-Phenylenebis(methylamine); 1,3-Bis(aminomethyl)benzene; 1,3-Phenylenedimethanamine; 1,3-Xylylenediamine m-Xylylenediamine; 1,3-Xylenediamine m-Xylenediamine; 1,3-Bis(aminomethyl)benzene

Identifiers
CAS Number	1477-55-0
3D model (JSmol)	Interactive image
ChemSpider	14404
ECHA InfoCard	100.014.575
EC Number	216-032-5
PubChem CID	15133
RTECS number	PF8970000
UNII	1E84B9YLJD
UN number	2735
CompTox Dashboard (EPA)	DTXSID9029649
- InChI: InChI=1S/C8H12N2/c9-5-7-2-1-3-8(4-7)6-10/h1-4H,5-6,9-10H2
- SMILES: C1=CC(=CC(=C1)CN)CN

Properties
Chemical formula	C_{8}H_{12}N_{2}
Molar mass	136.198 g·mol^{−1}
Appearance	Colorless liquid
Odor	Amine
Density	1.032 g/cm^{3} (20°C)
Melting point	14 °C; 58 °F; 288 K
Boiling point	247 °C; 477 °F; 520 K
Solubility in water	Miscible (20°C)
Vapor pressure	0.03 mmHg (25°C)

Hazards
Flash point	117 °C; 243 °F; 390 K
- Lethal dose or concentration (LD, LC)
LD_{50} (median dose)	700 ppm/1 hour (rat, inhalation); 930 mg/kg (rat, oral); 2 g/kg (rabbit, skin)
- NIOSH (US health exposure limits)
REL (Recommended)	C 0.1 mg/m^{3} [skin]
- Except where otherwise noted, data are given for materials in their standard state (at 25 °C [77 °F], 100 kPa). Infobox references

m-Xylylenediamine is an organic compound with the formula C_{6}H_{4}(CH_{2}NH_{2})_{2}. A colorless oily liquid, it is produced by hydrogenation of isophthalonitrile.

== Uses and reactions ==
m-Xylylenediamine (MXDA) is used in a variety of industrial applications including amine based curing agents for epoxy resins which may then be formulated into coatings, adhesives, sealants, and elastomers.

m-Xylylenediamine undergoes the Sommelet reaction to give isophthalaldehyde.

== Hazards ==
Exposure to m-xylylenediamine may occur by inhalation, skin contact, eye exposure, or ingestion. It can cause chemical burns, tissue damage, delayed pulmonary edema, shock, and skin sensitization. Symptoms of inhalation include a burning sensation in the respiratory tract, cough, sore throat, labored breathing, and dyspnea (shortness of breath). It is also flammable and produces toxic fumes when burned. m-Xylylenediamine reacts with acids, acid chlorides, and acid anhydrides.
