= Tetramethylxylylene diisocyanate =

Names
- Preferred IUPAC name 1,3-Bis(2-isocyanatopropan-2-yl)benzene

Identifiers
CAS Number	2778-42-9
3D model (JSmol)	Interactive image
ChEMBL	ChEMBL3183020
ChemSpider	16747
ECHA InfoCard	100.018.614
EC Number	220-474-4
PubChem CID	17719
UNII	YMD74QL0TC
CompTox Dashboard (EPA)	DTXSID4027498
- InChI: InChI=1S/C14H16N2O2/c1-13(2,15-9-17)11-6-5-7-12(8-11)14(3,4)16-10-18/h5-8H,1-4H3 Key: AZYRZNIYJDKRHO-UHFFFAOYSA-N
- SMILES: CC(C)(C1=CC(=CC=C1)C(C)(C)N=C=O)N=C=O

Properties
Chemical formula	C_{14}H_{16}N_{2}O_{2}
Molar mass	244.294 g·mol^{−1}
Appearance	Colorless liquid
Density	1.06 g/cm^{3}
Melting point	−10 °C (14 °F; 263 K)

Hazards
- GHS labelling
Pictograms	(GHS05: Corrosive) (GHS07: Exclamation mark) (GHS08: Health hazard) (GHS09: Environmental hazard)
Signal word	Danger
Hazard statements	H315, H317, H319, H330, H334, H335, H372, H410
Precautionary statements	P260, P264, P270, P271, P272, P273, P280, P284, P285, P302+P352, P304+P340, P304+P341, P305+P351+P338, P310, P312, P314, P320, P321, P332+P313, P333+P313, P337+P313, P342+P311, P362, P363, P391, P403+P233, P405, P501
- Except where otherwise noted, data are given for materials in their standard state (at 25 °C [77 °F], 100 kPa). Infobox references

Tetramethylxylene diisocyanate (TMXDI) is an organic compound with the formula C_{6}H_{4}(CMe_{2}NCO)_{2} (Me = CH_{3}). Introduced in the 1980s by American Cyanamid, the molecule features two isocyanate groups. TMXDI is generally classified as an aliphatic isocyanate, which are generally more UV stable than their aromatic counterparts.

== Production ==
Many isocyanates are produced by phosgenation of amines, but TMXDI is not. It is produced by the reaction of diisopropenylbenzene with hydrogen chloride followed by isocyanic acid:

C_{6}H_{4}(C(Me)=CH_{2})_{2} + 2 HCl → C_{6}H_{4}(CMe_{2}Cl)_{2}
C_{6}H_{4}(CMe_{2}Cl)_{2} + 2 HNCO → C_{6}H_{4}(CMe_{2}NCO)_{2} + 2 HCl

== Uses ==
A key use for TMXDI is in manufacturing polyurethane prepolymers. It is also used to manufacture polyurethane dispersions (PUDs). These materials are then further used to manufacture coatings, adhesives, sealants and elastomers.

TMXDI has been considered as a replacement for Isophorone diisocyanate (IPDI). IPDI has a molecular weight of 222.3 and thus a NCO equivalent weight of 111.15. TMXDI has a molecular weight of 244.3 and thus an equivalent weight of 122.15. Thus per mole, approximately 10% more is required than the equivalent prepolymer based on IPDI. This difference increases cost.When making polyurethanes dispersions (PUDs) TMXDI is advantageous. Being sterically hindered, the NCO groups are slower reacting which is good when dispersing a prepolymer in water to make a PUD. It reduces side reactions and allows more time to allow the dispersion stage before the mix is chain extended. This is done usually with a diamine. It has even found use in a rocket propellant binder by the US military.

== Safety ==
Extensive data has become available.

== See also ==
- Hexamethylene diisocyanate
- Isophorone diisocyanate
- Methylene diphenyl diisocyanate
- Toluene diisocyanate
