= Hydrogenated MDI =

Names
- IUPAC name 1-isocyanato-4-[(4-isocyanatocyclohexyl)methyl]cyclohexane
- Other names H_{12}MDI; 4,4′-diisocyanato dicyclohexylmethane dicyclohexylmethane-4,4'-diisocyanate

Identifiers
CAS Number	5124-30-1
3D model (JSmol)	Interactive image
ChEBI	CHEBI:53216
ChEMBL	ChEMBL1878565
ChemSpider	19934
ECHA InfoCard	100.023.512
EC Number	225-863-2
PubChem CID	21202
RTECS number	NQ9250000
UNII	6Y80AJA84R
UN number	2206
CompTox Dashboard (EPA)	DTXSID3027588
- InChI: InChI=1S/C15H22N2O2/c18-10-16-14-5-1-12(2-6-14)9-13-3-7-15(8-4-13)17-11-19/h12-15H,1-9H2 Key: KORSJDCBLAPZEQ-UHFFFAOYSA-N
- SMILES: C1CC(CCC1CC2CCC(CC2)N=C=O)N=C=O

Properties
Chemical formula	C_{15}H_{22}N_{2}O_{2}
Molar mass	262.353 g·mol^{−1}

Hazards
- GHS labelling
Pictograms	(GHS06: Toxic) (GHS07: Exclamation mark) (GHS08: Health hazard)
Signal word	Danger
Hazard statements	H315, H317, H319, H331, H334, H335
Precautionary statements	P261, P264, P271, P272, P280, P285, P302+P352, P304+P340, P304+P341, P305+P351+P338, P311, P312, P321, P332+P313, P333+P313, P337+P313, P342+P311, P362, P363, P403+P233, P405, P501
- Except where otherwise noted, data are given for materials in their standard state (at 25 °C [77 °F], 100 kPa). Infobox references

Hydrogenated MDI (H_{12}MDI or 4,4′-diisocyanato dicyclohexylmethane) is an organic compound in the class known as isocyanates. More specifically, it is an aliphatic diisocyanate. It is a liquid at room temperature and is manufactured in relatively small quantities. It is also known as 4,4'-methylenedi(cyclohexyl isocyanate) or methylene bis(4-cyclohexylisocyanate) and has the formula CH_{2}[(C_{6}H_{10})NCO]_{2}.

== Manufacture ==
The product is manufactured by hydrogenation of methylene diphenyl diisocyanate. It may also be manufactured by phosgenation of 4,4-Diaminodicyclohexylmethane.

== Uses ==
Aliphatic diisocyanates are not used in the production of polyurethane foam as the cost is too high and foam is very much a commodity. It is used in special applications for polyurethane, such as enamel coatings which are resistant to abrasion and degradation from ultraviolet light. There are also multiple patents where prepolymers based on it are used in golf ball production. It is available commercially under the tradename of Desmodur W from Covestro - formerly Bayer Material Science. It is used as a reactive building block for the preparation of other chemical products such as isocyanate terminated prepolymers and other urethane polymers. The isocyanate groups can undergo addition reactions at room temperature with compounds which contain active hydrogens especially amines and polyols. Polyurethane resins based on this diisocyanate have good flexibility and mechanical strength. The polymers formed tend to have abrasion and hydrolysis resistance as well as retaining gloss and physical properties upon weathering. The resins based on this material are useful in coatings for flooring, roofing, maintenance and adhesives, and sealants. They find use in the coatings, adhesives, sealants and elastomers (CASE) applications. A prepolymer made from H_{12}MDI and incorporating dimethylol propionic acid can also be converted to light stable polyurethane dispersions.

== See also ==
- Hexamethylene diisocyanate
- Methylene diphenyl diisocyanate
- Toluene diisocyanate
- Isophorone diisocyanate
