= HMDI =

HMDI may refer to:

- Hydrogenated MDI or 4,4′-diisocyanato dicyclohexylmethane, usually abbreviated as H_{12}MDI
- Hexamethylene diisocyanate, usually abbreviated as HDI
