= Occupational asthma =

- Specialty: Respiratory system

Occupational asthma is new onset asthma or the recurrence of previously quiescent asthma directly caused by exposure to an agent at workplace. It is an occupational lung disease and a type of work-related asthma. Agents that can induce occupational asthma can be grouped into sensitizers and irritants.

Sensitizer-induced occupational asthma is an immunologic form of asthma which occurs due to inhalation of specific substances (i.e., high-molecular-weight proteins from plants and animal origins, or low-molecular-weight agents that include chemicals, metals and wood dusts) and occurs after a latency period of several weeks to years.

Irritant-induced (occupational) asthma is a non-immunologic form of asthma that results from a single or multiple high dose exposure to irritant products. It is usually develops early after exposure; however, it can also develop insidiously over a few months after a massive exposure to a complex mixture of alkaline dust and combustion products, as shown in the World Trade Center disaster. Unlike those with sensitizer-induced occupational asthma, subjects with irritant-induced occupational asthma do not develop work-related asthma symptoms after re-exposure to low concentrations of the irritant that initiated the symptoms. Reactive airways dysfunction syndrome (RADS) is a severe form of irritant induced asthma where respiratory symptoms usually develop in the minutes or hours after a single accidental inhalation of a high concentration of irritant gas, aerosol, vapor, or smoke.

Another type of work-related asthma is work-exacerbated asthma (WEA) which is asthma worsened by workplace conditions but not caused by it. WEA is present in about a fifth of patients with asthma and a wide variety of conditions at work, including irritant chemicals, dusts, second-hand smoke, common allergens that may be present at work, as well as other "exposures" such as emotional stress, worksite temperature, and physical exertion can exacerbate asthma symptoms in these patients. Both occupational asthma and work-exacerbated asthma can be present in an individual.

A number of diseases have symptoms that mimic occupational asthma, such as asthma due to nonoccupational causes, chronic obstructive pulmonary disease (COPD), irritable larynx syndrome, hyperventilation syndrome, hypersensitivity pneumonitis, and bronchiolitis obliterans.

== Signs and symptoms ==
Like other types of asthma, it is characterized by airway inflammation, reversible airways obstruction, and bronchospasm, but it is caused by something in the workplace environment. Symptoms include shortness of breath, tightness of the chest, coughing, sputum production and wheezing. Some patients may also develop upper airway symptoms such as itchy eyes, tearing, sneezing, nasal congestion and rhinorrhea.

Symptoms may develop over many years as in sensitizer-induced asthma or may occur after a single exposure to a high-concentration agent as in case of RADS.

== Risk factors ==
At present, over 400 workplace substances have been identified as having asthmagenic or allergenic properties. Agents such as flour, diisocyanates, latex, persulfate salts, aldehydes, animals, wood dusts, metals, enzymes usually account for the majority cases; however, the distribution of causal agents may vary widely across geographic areas, depending on the pattern of industrial activities. For example, in France the industries most affected are bakeries and cake-shops, automobile industry and hairdressers, whereas in Canada the principal cause is wood dust, followed by isocyanates. Furthermore, the most common cause of occupational asthma in the workplace are isocyanates. Isocyanates are used in the production of motor vehicles and in the application of orthopaedic polyurethane and fibreglass casts.

The occupations most at risk are: adhesive handlers (e.g. acrylate), animal handlers and veterinarians (animal proteins), bakers and millers (cereal grains), carpet makers (gums), electronics workers (soldering resin), forest workers, carpenters and cabinetmakers (wood dust), hairdressers (e.g. persulfate), health care workers (latex and chemicals such as glutaraldehyde), janitors and cleaning staff (e.g. chloramine-T), pharmaceutical workers (drugs, enzymes), cannabis cultivation and processing technicians (e.g. organic particulate matter and dust from plants, mold, endotoxins), seafood processors, shellac handlers (e.g. amines), solderers and refiners (metals), spray painters, insulation installers, plastics and foam industry workers (e.g. diisocyanates), textile workers (dyes) and users of plastics and epoxy resins (e.g. anhydrides).

The following tables show occupations that are known to be at risk for occupational asthma. The main reference is the Canadian Centre for Occupational Health and Safety.

Grains, flours, plants and gums
Occupation	Agent
Bakers, millers	Wheat
Chemists, coffee bean baggers and handlers, gardeners, millers, oil industry workers, farmers	Castor beans
Cigarette factory workers	Tobacco dust
Drug manufacturers, mold makers in sweet factories, printers	Gum acacia
Farmers, grain handlers	Grain dust
Gum manufacturers, sweet makers	Gum tragacanth
Strawberry growers	Strawberry pollen
Tea sifters and packers	Tea dust
Tobacco farmers	Tobacco leaf
Woollen industry workers	Wool

Animals, insects and fungi
Occupation	Agent
Bird fanciers	Avian proteins
Cosmetic manufacturers	Carmine
Entomologists	Moths, butterflies
Feather pluckers	Feathers
Field contact workers	Crickets
Fish bait breeders	Bee moths
Flour mill workers, bakers, farm workers, grain handlers	Grain storage mites, alternaria, aspergillus
Laboratory workers	Locusts, cockroaches, grain weevils, rats, mice, guinea pigs, rabbits
Mushroom cultivators	Mushroom spores
Oyster farmers	Sea pineapples (Hoya)
Pea sorters	Mexican bean weevils
Pigeon breeders	Pigeons
Poultry workers	Chickens
Prawn processors	Prawns
Silkworm sericulturers	Silkworms
Zoological museum curators	Beetles

Chemicals/Materials
Occupation	Agent
Aircraft fitters	Triethyltetramine
Aluminum cable solderers	Aminoethylethanolamine
Aluminum pot room workers	Fluorine
Autobody workers	Acrylates (resins, glues, sealants, adhesives)
Brewery workers	Chloramine-T
Chemical plant workers, pulp mill workers	Chlorine
Dye weighers	Levafix brilliant yellow, drimarene brilliant yellow and blue, cibachrome brilliant scarlet
Electronics workers	Colophony
Epoxy resin manufacturers	Tetrachlorophthalic anhydride
Foundry mold makers	Furan-based resin binder systems
Fur dyers	Para-phenylenediamine
Hairdressers	Persulphate salts
Health care workers	Glutaraldehyde, latex
Laboratory workers, nurses, phenolic resin molders	Formaldehyde
Meat wrappers	Polyvinyl chloride vapour
Paint manufacturers, plastic molders, tool setters	Phthalic anhydride
Paint sprayers	Dimethylethanolamine
Photographic workers, shellac manufacturers	Ethylenediamine
Refrigeration industry workers	CFCs
Solderers	Polyether alcohol, polypropylene glycol

Isocyanates and metals
Occupation	Agent
Boat builders, foam manufacturers, office workers, plastics factory workers, refrigerator manufacturers, TDI manufacturers/users, printers, laminators, tinners, toy makers	TDI
Boiler cleaners, gas turbine cleaners	Vanadium
Car sprayers	Hexamethylene diisocyanate
Cement workers	Potassium dichromate
Chrome platers, chrome polishers	Sodium bichromate, chromic acid, potassium chromate
Nickel platers	Nickel sulphate
Platinum chemists	Chloroplatinic acid
Platinum refiners	Platinum salts
Polyurethane foam manufacturers, printers, laminators	Diphenylmethane diisocyanate
Rubber workers	Naphthalene diisocyanate
Tungsten carbide grinders	Cobalt
Welders	Stainless steel fumes

Drugs and enzymes
Occupation	Agent
Ampicillin manufacturers	Phenylglycine acid chloride
Detergent manufacturers	Bacillus subtilis
Enzyme manufacturers	Fungal alpha-amylase
Food technologists, laboratory workers	Papain
Pharmacists	Gentian powder, flaviastase
Pharmaceutical workers	Methyldopa, salbutamol, dichloramine, piperazine dihydrochloride, spiramycin, penicillins, sulphathiazole, sulphonechloramides, chloramine-T, phosdrin, pancreatic extracts
Poultry workers	Amprolium hydrochloride
Process workers, plastic polymer production workers	Trypsin, bromelin

Woods
Occupation	Agent
Carpenters, timber millers, woodworkers	Western red cedar, cedar of Lebanon, iroko, California redwood, ramin, African zebrawood
Sawmill workers, pattern makers	Mansonia, oak, mahogany, abiruana
Wood finishers	Cocobolo
Wood machinists	Kejaat

== Diagnosis ==
To diagnose occupational asthma it is necessary to confirm the symptoms of asthma and establish the causal connection with the work environment. Various diagnostic tests can be used to aid in diagnoses of work-related asthma.

A spirometer is a device used to measure timed expired and inspired volumes, and can be used to help diagnose asthma.

A peak flow meter is a hand-held device which measures how fast a person can exhale – peak expiratory flow rate (PEFR) – and is a reliable test for occupational asthma. Serial PEFR can be measured to see if there is a difference in ability to exhale at work compared to that in a controlled environment.

A non-specific bronchial hyperreactivity test can be used to support the diagnose occupational asthma. It involves measuring the forced expiratory volume in 1 second (FEV-1) of the patient before and after exposure to methacholine or mannitol. Presence of airway responsiveness, i.e. significant drop in FEV-1, can be seen in patients with occupational asthma.

Specific inhalation challenges test consist of exposing the subjects to the suspected occupational agent in the laboratory and/or at the workplace and assessing for asthma symptoms as well as a reduction in FEV_{1}.

Other tests such as the skin prick test, serum immunologic testing and measurement of sputum eosinophils can also be useful in establishing the diagnosis of occupational asthma.

== Prevention ==
Several forms of preventive measures have been suggested to prevent development of occupational asthma and also detect risk or disease early to allow intervention and improve outcomes. These include: comprehensive programs, education and training, medical examinations, use of medications, reduction of exposures and elimination of exposures. A review on the effectiveness of prevention measurements indicated that removal or reduction of exposure may improve asthma symptoms when compared to uninterrupted exposure. Removal from exposure may improve lung function when compared to continued exposure. Removal from exposure may improve symptoms and lung function more than reduction of exposure among patients exposed to low molecular weight agents, such as isocyanates, diisocyanates, plicatic acid, metals and anhydrides. Two studies reported an increase of job loss associated with removal from exposure. Four studies reported a decrease in income of 20% to 50% after removal from exposure. The authors suggested that the benefit of a better improvement in air quality be weighed against the potential for a higher risk of job loss.

A video on research on preventing asthma in health care

Asthma symptoms and airway hyperresponsiveness can persist for several years after removal from the offending environment. Thus, early restriction from exposure to the trigger is advisable. Completely stopping exposure is more effective treatment than reducing exposure, but not always feasible.

== Management ==
=== Medication ===
Medications used for occupational asthma are similar to those used for other types of asthma such as short-acting beta-agonists like salbutamol or terbutaline, long-acting beta-agonists like salmeterol and formoterol and inhaled corticosteroids. Immunotherapy can also be used in some cases of sensitizer-induced occupational asthma.

== Epidemiology ==
Occupational asthma is one of the most common occupational lung diseases. Approximately 17% of all adult-onset asthma cases are related to occupational exposures. About one fourth of adults with asthma have work-exacerbated asthma. Patients with work-related asthma are more likely to experience asthma attacks, emergency room visits, and worsening of their asthma symptoms compared with other adult asthma patients.

== Society and culture ==
=== Compensation ===
When a person is diagnosed with occupational asthma, it can result in serious socio-economic consequences not only for the workers but also for the employer and the healthcare system because the worker must change positions. The probability of being re-employed is lower for those with occupational asthma compared to those with normal asthma. The employer not only pays compensation to the employee, but will also have to spend a considerable amount of time and energy and funds for hiring and training new personnel. In the United States, it was estimated that the direct cost of occupational asthma in 1996 was $1.2 billion and the indirect cost $0.4 billion, for a total cost of $1.6 billion. In most cases, the employer could have saved more money by adhering to safety standards rather than causing employees to become injured.

However, this can entail severe socio-economic consequences for the worker as well as the employer due to loss of job, unemployment, compensation issues, medical expenditures, and hiring and re-training of new personnel.

== See also ==
- Chronic obstructive pulmonary disease (COPD)
- Specific inhalation challenge
- Occupational safety and health
- National Institute of Occupational Safety and Health (NIOSH)
- Labor rights
