= Wanhua (disambiguation) =

Wanhua (simplified Chinese: 万华; traditional Chinese: 萬華) may refer to:

- Wanhua District, Taipei, Taiwan
- Wanhua Group (disambiguation), several (former) closely related companies.
  - Wanhua Chemical Group, the 37th largest chemical companies of the world, sometimes known as just Wanhua

== See also ==
- Kaleidoscope, known in Japanese as 万華鏡, Mangekyō
