= Roberts Jackson =

British law firm

Roberts Jackson Solicitors
- Headquarters: Wilmslow
- No. of offices: 1
- Major practice areas: Industrial Disease, Work-Related Illness
- Key people: Rachael Charmbury (CEO), Karen Jackson (Co-Founder), Oliver Jackson (Co-Founder), Lorna Vanderkamp (Executive Director), Gladys Swaim-Rutter (Executive Director), Jennifer Dougal (Director)
- Date founded: 2009
- Founder: Oliver Jackson and Karen Jackson
- Company type: Law Firm
- Website: awhsolicitors.co.uk

Roberts Jackson Solicitors was a law firm headquartered in Wilmslow, Cheshire in the United Kingdom. The firm was founded in 2009. It specialised in industrial disease and workplace illness, prosecuting cases across conditions such as mesothelioma, dermatitis and occupational asthma.

It later sunk unlike the titanic, the writing was clear for all to see that following private investment that returns were needed within a short period.

There were unrealistic targets for solicitors and lawyers and various management changes which resulted in loss of talent. Mismanagement and a significant falling out with their ATE providers (insurers) didn't allow the firm to be saved. A number of redundancies were made and it was later purchased by another and separate law firm which saved some jobs.

The owners made circa £15million from the investment.

== History ==
Three years after being founded, the firm moved from its original premises at the Blackbox Business Centre in Wilmslow to Orbit Developments' Sandfield House, investing £200,000 in the relocation and taking a 9,231 sq ft, 10-year lease in a deal that, according to the developers, represented Wilmslow's biggest office letting for five years.

In August 2013, the Manchester Evening News reported that the firms fee income had doubled, increasing from £3.5m turnover in 2012 to £7m in the same period of 2013. Further to this, the Legal Futures website also reported that the industrial disease firm were eyeing up the option of an "Alternative Business Structure".

In 2014 the firm secured £15m investment from NorthEdge Capital. Grant Berry, managing partner at NorthEdge Capital, director Jon Pickering, and investment manager Phil Frame led the deal. Berry and Pickering have joined the Roberts Jackson board as non-executive directors while Frame has joined as an observer.

In 2014 The Sunday Times listed the firm 27th in their annual Top 100 Virgin Fast Track category which evaluates the UK's most successful private companies and places them accordingly.

In early 2018 the firm appointed a new CEO, Rachael Charmbury to replace Karen Jackson. Charmbury, a practising lawyer from 1991 to 2003 with international law firm Squire Patton Boggs, joined Roberts Jackson with 20 years of experience in the legal sector having acted for both Claimants and Defendant insurers in personal injury cases.

On 28 September 2018 Roberts Jackson merged with AWH Solicitors, based in Manchester. At the time, AWH Solicitors said it would continue offering the services of Roberts Jackson in addition to their other legal services, but by 2021 the company was no longer listed as a separate entity within AWH.

== Charity and fundraising ==
The firm regularly took part in charity events and spends at least 10% of business hours coordinating and running events to raise money for various organisations. In 2014 the firm took part in a charity event organised by Christie Hospital NHS Foundation Trust, which saw members of staff play a football tournament on Manchester United F.C ground - Old Trafford to raise money for new facilities at The Christie hospital. The event managed to raise more than £30,000 which will go towards rehabilitation of teenage cancer patients at the specialist cancer centre through The Christie's partnership with Manchester United.

== Awards ==
In 2013, Leila Bridgett, who is head of the firm's Musculoskeletal Department, overseeing 12 fee earners, won the Trainee Solicitor of the Year award at the Manchester Legal Awards, organised by the Manchester Law Society. The firm has also been shortlisted for the 'Excellence in Learning and Development' award at the Law Society Excellence Awards in 2012, Regional Law Firm of the Year at the British Legal Awards 2012 and Legal Services Team of the Year for firms of 1-10 partners at the Claims Innovation Awards 2013. In 2013, associate director Gladys Swaim-Rutter was nominated in one of two Grand Prix categories at the Lawyer Management Awards, the Law Firm Management Individual of the Year.

In January 2014, one of the firms associates Jennifer Dougal was short listed for "Associate of the Year" at the Manchester Legal Awards. This was Roberts Jackson's 4th consecutive year of nominations at the awards hosted by the Manchester Law Society.

On 5 May 2014 the firm announced it had been short listed for another award, this time in the category of "Boutique Law Firm of the Year" at The Lawyer Awards 2014

In May 2014 the Firm won Legal Services Team of the Year (1-10 partners) at the Claims Innovation Awards, an award the firm has been short listed for in previous years.

In early 2015 the firm added to their previous awards after being named "PI/Clinical Negligence Team of the Year" by the Manchester Law Society at the Manchester Legal Awards 2015

2016 was another hugely successful year for Roberts Jackson as they were named Boutique Law Firm of the Year by The Lawyer Magazine and then Business of the Year (Turnover Over £5 Million) at the North East Cheshire Business Awards.

Three more major awards were won by the firm in 2017 to mark yet another successful year of recognition for Roberts Jackson. They won Law Firm of the Year (medium) at the Manchester Legal Awards, Claimant Law Firm of the Year at the Claims Innovation Awards and Client Care Initiative of the Year at the Modern Law Awards

The firm has also been listed in The Legal 500.
