= Vienna Capital Partners =

Corporate finance advisor

Vienna Capital Partners (VCP) is a corporate finance advisor and private equity investor headquartered in Vienna, Austria.

The company is mainly focused on corporate finance, direct investment and trust management in Central and Eastern Europe countries.

== History ==
Vienna Capital Partners was founded in 1998 by its Senior Partner Heinrich Pecina, who was on the managing board of Creditanstalt Investment Bank (CAIB) from 1990 to 1997. VCP is owned by him and his partners (Christian Fischer, Guzel Gumerova, Christian Riener and Piotr Samojlik), either directly or through their family foundations, with Collegia Privatstiftung, an Austrian private foundation controlled by Heinrich Pecina, owning the majority.

Since the foundation in 1998 VCP has become an important dealmaker in Central and Eastern Europe. For example, VCP was involved in the sale of Austrian Flaga to UGI Corporation (1999), in the buy-out and delisting of Austriamicrosystems together with Schroder Ventures (Austria 2000), in the acquisition of Pari Business Media Group by Bonnier Media Group (Bulgaria 2005), Celesio’s acquisition of Medika d.d. from Novartis (Croatia 2005) or in the sale of Hand-Prod to OneMed Group (Poland 2007).

In the first half of 2010 VCP reported one of the most successful periods in the company’s history. In the first six months of 2010 VCP closed transactions with a total volume of 1.5 billion Euros. For the whole year VCP expects a total transaction volume of about 2 billion Euros. In June 2010 VCP completed the biggest transaction in the company’s history: the restructuring of the Hungarian chemicals company BorsodChem, an isocyanates and polyvinyl chloride (PVC) producer. On the Polish market, VCP was ranked second in Mergermarket's 2010 league table of M&A advisors.

== Subsidiaries ==
- VCP Industrie Beteiligungen AG (formerly AURORA Holding AG)
- 100% of VCP Polska Sp. z o.o.
- 100% of CEE Oil & Gas Beteiligung und Verwaltung GmbH
  - 100% of CE Oil & Gas Beteiligung und Verwaltung AG.
- 100% of VCP Energy Holding
  - Ce Power & Energy Holding GmbH
    - CE Oil & Gas Trading AG

== Operations ==
The company is focused on "Converging Europe", comprising the new EU-member states, potential future EU-accession candidates as well as other EU countries, such as Austria and Germany that are directly impacted by the ongoing convergence process. VCP is active in all industries with a special focus on medium-to-large-sized enterprises and serves a diverse range of clients including management teams, entrepreneurs, institutional investors and governments.

The company is active in three business areas: Corporate finance advisory (advisory on mergers and acquisitions, capital raising and securities issues), direct investments and trust management services. Its offices in Vienna, Warsaw and Zagreb are supplemented by an international network of contacts and cooperative partners.

=== VCP and Russia ===
During the initial takeover of BorsodChem (in 2001), VCP has been suspected of secretly acting on behalf of Russian Gazprom. In the report Gazprom's European Web, published by the Soviet dissident think tank The Jamestown Foundation, the authors further criticize the transaction's complex arrangements and saying that "this intricate set of maneuvers should have alerted EU regulators to investigate what appeared to be an unusually complex series of deals."

In 2002, the Hungarian Prime Minister called for an investigation into the BorsodChem deal to examine these allegations. The official investigation did not find any trace of collusion between VCP and the Russian companies and Hungarian daily newspaper Népszabadság had to publish a correcting article for its unfounded accusations.

=== Investment in BorsodChem ===
VCP’s subsidiary CE Oil & Gas Beteiligung und Verwaltung AG became main shareholder of BorsodChem in 2001.

2004 VCP sold off the greater part of its 91% holding in BorsodChem through an international secondary offering. In 2006, VCP together with Permira successfully completed a public purchase offer for BorsodChem and delisted the company.

In 2010 China's Wanhua Industrial Group became a 38% shareholder in BorsodChem and acquired a call option to purchase the remaining shares in the company within the next two years. The stake and call option were provided partly in return for a 140 million Euros investment from Wanhua, which BorsodChem would put towards the completion of a toluene diisocyanate (TDI) plant and a nitric acid facility at its main site at Kazincbarcika, Hungary. Wanhua plans to raise its stake to 100% from the present 38% soon and to make BorsodChem responsible for the operations of the Wanhua group in Europe, the Middle East and Africa. In November 2010 BorsodChem reported that it will double its EBITDA in 2010 in comparison to a year ago, while revenues will increase significantly.

=== Other major transactions in 2010 ===
In 2010 VCP was also active in the following transactions in Converging Europe (extract):

- The public takeover of Croatian Belisce Group, a company in the paper and corrugated board industry, by Duropack AG, a subsidiary of Constantia-Packaging.
- The strategic cooperation of German financial services provider Allianz and the Hungarian FHB Bank that is specialized in real estate financing. This cooperation laid the groundwork for the acquisition of Allianz Bank by FHB Bank that took place in September 2010.
- The closing of the sale of 100% of Central European Distribution Corporation’s (CEDC) Polish Wholesale Business to Eurocash SA.
- The acquisition of a majority stake in Agros Nova by IK Investment Partners.

=== Current and exited investments (incomplete list) ===
Current Investments:

- A stake in FHB (Hungary), Hungarian mortgage bank
- A stake in BorsodChem (Hungary), PVC, TDI and MDI producer in Central and Eastern Europe
- A stake in OneMed Group (Finland), healthcare products distributor in the Nordic countries
- Moldovan bank Unibank S.A., purchased from Russian Petrokommertz, which was owned by Lukoil

Exited investments:

- NCL Media Group (Croatia), Croatian publishing group "Nacional".
- "Blic", which publishes one of the highest-circulating newspapers in Serbia
- 86,19% of Polski Gaz. Grizzly Gas Holding holds remaining 13,81% of shares. Polski Gaz is the liquefied petroleum gas distributor in Poland.
- 16,5% stake in Hungarian petrochemicals company Tiszai Vegyi Kombinát, manufacturer of olefins and polymers
- Austriamicrosystems (Austria), designer and manufacture of analog-digital integrated circuits (ICs) for the automotive, communication and industrial markets
- Cemet (Poland), rail bound transport company for cement, aggregates and other bulk goods
- Tankerska Plovidba (Croatia), shipping company

== Recruitment of Austrian Interior Minister ==
Ernst Strasser, Austrian Minister of the Interior between 2000 and 2004, was a managing partner at VCP Energy Holding between 2005 and 2008. He took care of energy projects in the new EU member countries in Eastern Europe and reportedly enjoyed a salary of 500,000 Euros per year. Ernst Strasser's former cabinet secretary Christoph Ulmer was Executive Director of VCP-owned CE Oil & Gas Trading AG.
