= Polymethylene polyphenylene isocyanate =

Polyurea-based polymer derived from isocyanate monomers

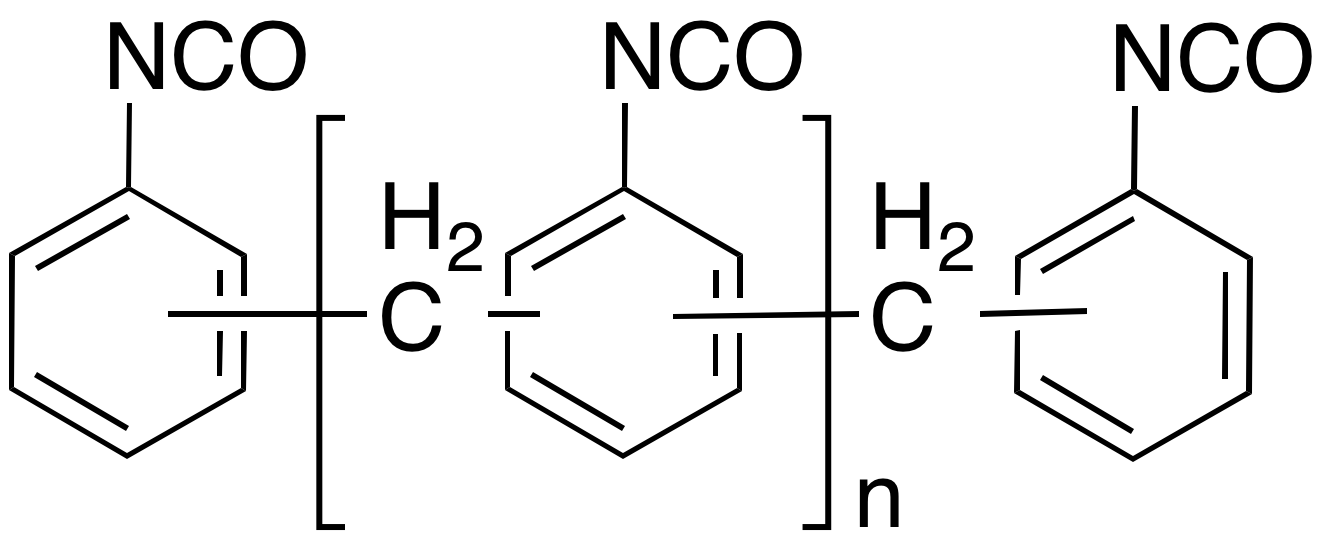

Names
- Other names Polymeric diphenylmethane diisocyanate; Poly((phenyl isocyanate)-co-formaldehyde); Polymethylene polyphenyl polyisocyanate

Identifiers
CAS Number	9016-87-9
Abbreviations	PPI
ChEBI	CHEBI:82567
ECHA InfoCard	100.112.554
KEGG	C19571
CompTox Dashboard (EPA)	DTXSID3047473

Properties
Chemical formula	(C_{8}H_{5}NO)_{n}
- Except where otherwise noted, data are given for materials in their standard state (at 25 °C [77 °F], 100 kPa). Infobox references

Polymethylene polyphenylene isocyanate (PPI or PMDI), is a polyurea-based polymer derived from isocyanate monomers that is used in some glues, aerosol foams, plastics, paint and household products.

PPI is listed as a "hazardous agent" by the National Institutes of Health because it irritates skin and breathing passages at high concentrations. Some painters exposed to PPI and related isocyanate chemicals have developed occupational asthma. In chronic toxicity tests, mice exposed to low levels of PPI developed no side effects. Only those mice exposed to the two highest concentrations developed any lung symptoms. The two highest doses used in this study were 1.0 and 6.0 mg per cubic meter for 6 hours each day, 5 days each week for 2 years. The duration-adjusted exposure levels for these two high concentrations are equivalent to 11 ppb and 70 ppb, 24 hours/day for two years.
