= IPDI =

IPDI may stand for:

- Isophorone diisocyanate, an organic compound used in some special enamel coatings
- Institute for Politics, Democracy & the Internet at George Washington University
- Immediate Post-Death Interests a form of trust in England and Wales that can offer tax advantages
