= 1,3-Diisocyanatobenzene =

Names
- Preferred IUPAC name 1,3-Diisocyanatobenzene
- Other names m-Diisocyanatobenzene

Identifiers
CAS Number	123-61-5
3D model (JSmol)	Interactive image
ChemSpider	29002
ECHA InfoCard	100.004.217
EC Number	204-637-7
PubChem CID	31262
RTECS number	NR0150000
UNII	B44H9MFH1S
UN number	2206
CompTox Dashboard (EPA)	DTXSID9044792
- InChI: InChI=1S/C8H4N2O2/c11-5-9-7-2-1-3-8(4-7)10-6-12/h1-4H Key: VGHSXKTVMPXHNG-UHFFFAOYSA-N; InChI=1/C8H4N2O2/c11-5-9-7-2-1-3-8(4-7)10-6-12/h1-4H Key: VGHSXKTVMPXHNG-UHFFFAOYAI
- SMILES: c1cc(cc(c1)N=C=O)N=C=O

Properties
Chemical formula	C_{8}H_{4}N_{2}O_{2}
Molar mass	160.132 g·mol^{−1}
Appearance	White solid
Melting point	49-51

Hazards
- GHS labelling
Pictograms	(GHS06: Toxic) (GHS08: Health hazard) (GHS09: Environmental hazard)
Signal word	Warning
Hazard statements	H302, H312, H315, H319, H332, H334, H335
Precautionary statements	P261, P264, P270, P271, P280, P285, P301+P310, P301+P312, P302+P352, P304+P312, P304+P340, P304+P341, P305+P351+P338, P312, P321, P322, P330, P332+P313, P337+P313, P342+P311, P362, P363, P403+P233, P405, P501

Related compounds
Related compounds	Toluene diisocyanate
- Except where otherwise noted, data are given for materials in their standard state (at 25 °C [77 °F], 100 kPa). Infobox references

1,3-Diisocyanatobenzene is an aromatic isocyanate with the chemical formula C_{8}H_{4}N_{2}O_{2}.

== See also ==
- Toluene diisocyanate
