= Uranyl zinc acetate =

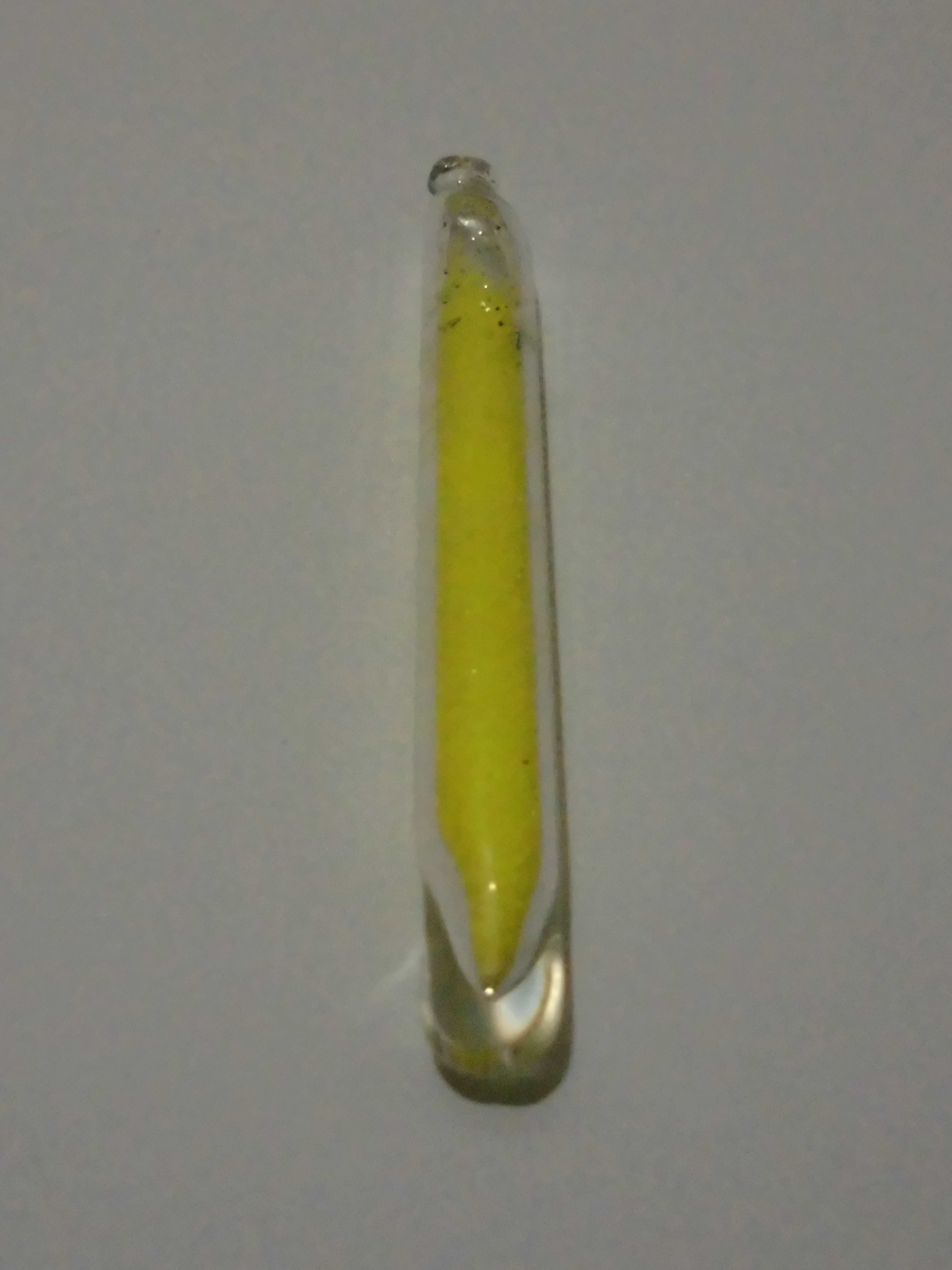

Names
- IUPAC name zinc;dioxouranium(2+);tetraacetate
- Other names zinc uranyl acetate

Identifiers
CAS Number	33959-50-1
3D model (JSmol)	Interactive image
ChemSpider	59696127
PubChem CID	22673297
- InChI: InChI=1S/4C2H4O2.2O.U.Zn/c4*1-2(3)4;;;;/h4*1H3,(H,3,4);;;;/q;;;;;;;+4/p-4 Key: GWVOTLSLVURWPV-UHFFFAOYSA-J
- SMILES: O=C(C)[O-].[O+]#[U]#[O+].O=C(C)[O-].O=C(C)[O-].[Zn+2].O=C(C)[O-]

Properties
Chemical formula	ZnUO_{2}(CH_{3}COO)_{4}
Molar mass	571.59 g/mol
- Except where otherwise noted, data are given for materials in their standard state (at 25 °C [77 °F], 100 kPa). verify (what is ?) Infobox references

Uranyl zinc acetate (ZnUO_{2}(CH_{3}COO)_{4}) is a compound of uranium.

Uranyl zinc acetate is used as a laboratory reagent in the determination of sodium concentrations of solutions using a method of quantitatively precipitating sodium with uranyl zinc acetate and gravimetrically determining the sodium as uranyl zinc sodium acetate, (UO_{2})_{3}ZnNa(CH_{3}CO_{2})_{9}·6H_{2}O. The presence of caesium and rubidium does not interfere with this reaction, but the presence of potassium and lithium must be removed prior to analysis.

This method was important to determine Na in urine for diagnostic purposes. Zinc uranyl acetate is sometimes called "sodium reagent" since pale yellow NaZn(UO_{2})_{3}(C_{2}H_{3}O_{2})_{9} is one of the very few insoluble sodium compounds.

== Laboratory use ==
Uranyl zinc acetate has been used as a catalyst for the demethoxylation of toluene-2,4-dicarbamate into toluene-2,4-diisocyanate (TDI).
