= Wanhua Group =

Wanhua Group (simplified Chinese: 万华集团; traditional Chinese: 萬華集團) may refer to:

- Wanhua Group Corporation, Chinese government-owned company (as of 2008)
  - Wanhua Chemical Group, co-founded by Wanhua Group Corporation in 1998, listed company since January 2001
  - Wanhua Industrial Group, co-founded by Wanhua Group Corporation in October 2001, direct parent company of the listed company from 2001 to 2018, acquired and owned BorsodChem from 2011 to 2018, majority shareholder of Wanhua Energysave Science and Technical Group
    - Wanhua Energysave Science and Technical Group. A unlisted public company

== See also ==
- Media Chinese International, a listed company. The company also owned another listed company, known as One Media Group. (Chinese: 萬華媒體集團 or just 萬華媒體)
