= BorsodChem =

Hungarian chemical raw material manufacturing company

- Founded: 1949
- Headquarters: Kazincbarcika, Hungary
- Key people: Jiansheng Ding (CEO)
- Revenue: 1,460,000,000
- Net income: 443,900,000 (2018)
- Number of employees: 3124 (2014)
- Website: BorsodChem.com

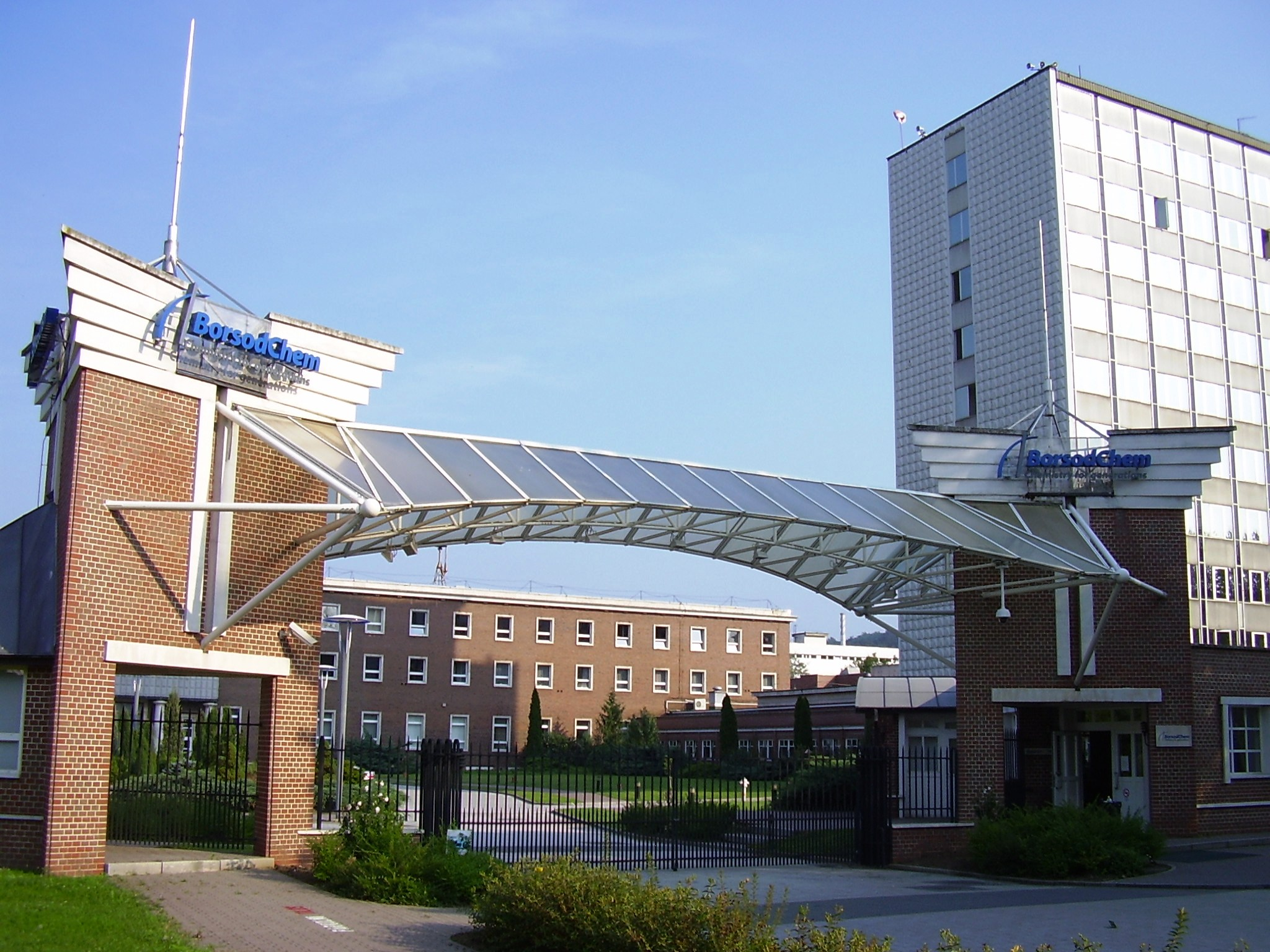

Wanhua-BorsodChem is a Hungarian chemical raw material manufacturing company headquartered in Kazincbarcika, Hungary. It is the European member of the partially state-owned Chinese Wanhua Chemical Group. The company specializes in isocyanates (MDI, TDI), PVC and chlor-alkali (vinyl) businesses. The main production site is located in Kazincbarcika, Hungary but the production is also supported by other European production capacities located in Ostrava, the Czech Republic and Kędzierzyn-Koźle, Poland. Several branch offices are available in Hungary, Belgium, the Czech Republic, Croatia, Italy and Poland. Since 2008 a new R&D and technical support center was established in Gödöllő.

== History ==
=== Beginnings ===
The establishment of the Borsodi Vegyi Kombinát (BVK) the predecessor of Wanhua-BorsodChem, was decided at the end of 1949, based on the Borsod coal, the water of the Sajó, the proximity of the road and the railway. In the new industrial area, a decision was made to build a coal classifier, a coking plant, a coal-fired power plant and a Lignite-based chemical plant (nitrogen plant), as well as service plants, with a budget allocation of HUF 1 billion. The giant investment took place between 1950 and 1955, and was inaugurated on 10 December 1955. It became the largest industrial facility in the country at the time. Deficiencies and errors made during construction delayed the start of continuous production for 3 years.

=== PVC era ===
The year 1963 brought the biggest changes in BVK's life to date. They switched to the production of natural gas-based synthesis gas, and in parallel, coke-based operations were discontinued. They merged with the Berente Chemical Works and launched the Olefin I program, under which the production of thermoplastic polyvinyl chloride (PVC) began for the first time in the country. They built their mercury cathode chlorine and hydrochloric acid plant.

The second expansion of the nitrogen plant began in 1964, during which the construction of their urea plant was also started. In 1969, the PVC-II Factory, which also produces PVC powder, was put into operation. At that time, BVK was the 6th largest company in the Hungarian chemical industry in terms of headcount.

A modern plastic factory capable of producing 150,000 tons of PVC per year was built in 1971. This became the largest chemical investment in Hungary to date. Three years later, the expansion continued with the construction of a new PVC plant (PVC III), which was built on oil instead of natural gas and processed ethylene purchased from the Tiszai Vegyi Kombinát (TVK). From the early 1980s, great emphasis was placed on plastic processing. In 1983, the mixing plant and the PVC window plant, the last plants in the program, were put into operation and the installation of the phosgene plant was completed.

== BorsodChem ==
=== Stock market membership in Budapest and London ===
On 1 August 1991, as the legal successor to the 1949-founded Borsodi Vegyi Kombinát, the company BorsodChem was officially established. BorsodChem has become one of the largest chemical companies in Hungary. In 1996, it became the first company to register its shares on the Budapest Stock Exchange as well as the London Stock Exchange. In 2000, he bought 28.5 percent of the shares of Tiszai Vegyi Kombinát, which were later resold to MOL.

=== M&A incident in 2000 ===
Irish-registered offshore company Milford Holdings purchased a 24.7% stake in 2000. It sold the stake to CIB, the Hungarian subsidiary of Banca Commerciale Italiana. Vienna Capital Partners was involved in the affair. Hungarian prime minister called for an investigation into the deal of M&A (Mergers and Acquisitions).

=== Wanhua Industrial Group and Wanhua Chemical Group ===
In 2006, the majority ownership of the company was acquired by Permira Venture Capital Fund, which delisted the shares from the stock exchange in the following year. Since 2011, BorsodChem Zrt. has been managed by the partially state-owned Chinese Wanhua Industrial Group and its subsidiary Wanhua Chemical Group, the fastest growing group of companies producing and selling polyurethane raw materials in the world. Today, Wanhua – BorsodChem is Hungary's leading chemical company and one of Europe's leading producers of MDI, TDI and PVC raw materials and a leading manufacturer of specialty chemical products. In 2019, a successor of Wanhua Industrial Group, injected the shares of BorsodChem into the listed associate company Wanhua Chemical Group.

According to the Dutch OSINT platform Datenna, Wanhua's stake in BorsodChem leads to a high risk of state influence on BorsodChem by the Chinese government.

=== Developments ===
At the end of 2018, Wanhua – BorsodChem decided to invest in brownfields and had begun to build an aniline factory. Of the cost of 142.2 million euros, 45 million is covered by the Hungarian state subsidy. The handover of the factory is expected in 2021. With the start-up of the new plant, the company will create about fifty new jobs.

In January 2019, BorsodChem made a contract with Swiss Casale SA for the supply of a new nitric acid plant to be added to the Hungarian, Kazincbarcika factory, which was identical to the unit already located on the site and had been operating since 2012. The new plant was inaugurated in July 2023, which included a total of €400 million in investment for new production units in the Berente Village area, as well as the 90,000 tonnes a year of concentrated nitric acid plant.

A supply contract for nitrogen, oxygen and compressed air was signed in January 2021 with Linde, who was expected to complete the construction of the largest air separation plant in Hungary by the end of that same year. Linde invested 39 million Euro into the air separation plant to increase their domestic capacity.

== Administrative changes ==
Thanks to the establishment of Borsodi Vegyi Kombinát and the huge number of workers attracted here, Kazincbarcika was awarded the city's rank and became one of the first so called 'socialist city' in 1954.

Its location in Berente, a village annexed to Kazincbarcika in 1954, caused several residents resenting the fact that they receive only a small part of the local taxes the factory pays. This led to the secession of Berente in 1999.
