= Sharon Lavigne =

American environmental activist (born 1950)

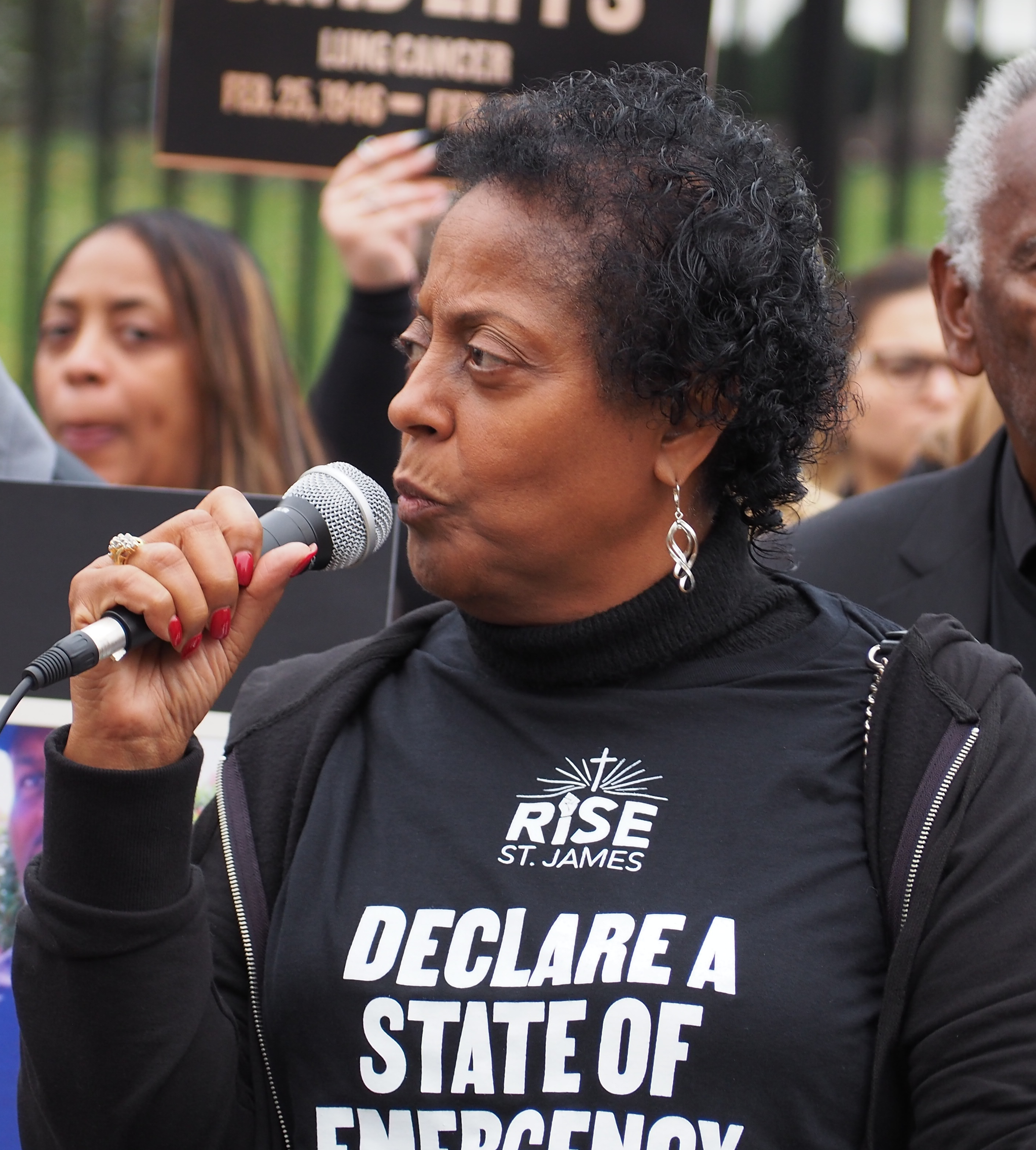

Sharon Lavigne (born May 1950) is an American environmental justice activist in Louisiana focused on combating petrochemical complexes in Cancer Alley. She is the 2022 recipient of the Laetare Medal, the highest honor for American Catholics, a 2021 recipient of the Goldman Environmental Prize and was named to 2024's TIME 100 and 2023's TIME Climate 100.

== Activism ==
Lavigne, who is from St. James Parish, Louisiana which is at the center of the alley, has testified before Congress, and runs a faith-based organization, RISE St. James, focused on preventing expansion and worsening petrochemical plant pollution in the area.

Lavigne is also a collaborator on the Coalition Against Death Alley, a regional environmental justice group. She is also a plaintiff in White Hat v. Landry, an environmental justice case, focused on changes in Louisiana Oil and Gas law.

Lavigne is focused in part on defending the cultural heritage of the African American community. In 2019, she organized the community against a new Formosa Plastics Corp factory that would have disrupted a slave grave in the community. In December 2020, the plant's process was stalled by court ruling. She had previously help stall similar projects from Wanhua Chemical Group and South Louisiana Methanol.

Lavigne was awarded the Goldman Environmental Prize in 2021. She was named the 2022 recipient of the University of Notre Dame's Laetare Medal on March 27, 2022. The same year, RISE, Earthjustice, Louisiana Bucket Brigade, and other plaintiffs won a lawsuit against Formosa that argued the potential air pollution of the proposed plant would violate federal standards. That court decision was later reversed on appeal in 2024.

== Personal life ==
Lavigne is a retired special education teacher. Her father was a sugarcane farmer in the area, and her mother a homemaker. Her family participated in civil rights actions in the area during the civil rights movement.

She is also a Black Catholic, a parishioner at St. James Catholic Church in St. James, Louisiana.
