= Ernst Strasser =

Austrian politician (born 1956)

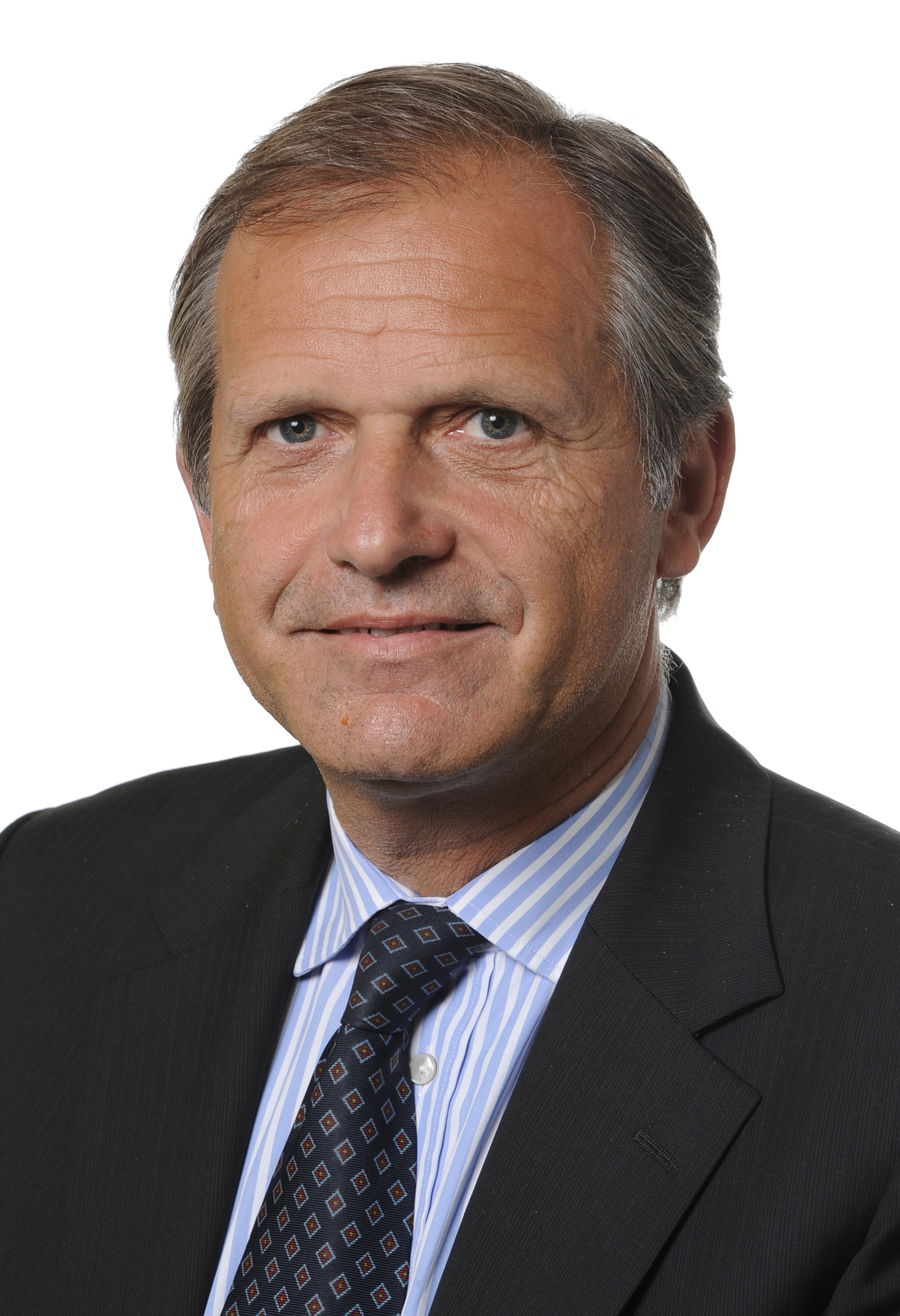

Federal Minister of the Interior of Austria
- In office 2000–2004
- Preceded by: Karl Schlögl
- Succeeded by: Liese Prokop

Member of the European Parliament for Austria
- In office 2009–2011

Personal details
- Party: Austrian People's Party
- Known for: Involvement in the 2011 cash for influence scandal

Ernst Strasser (* 29 April 1956 in Grieskirchen, Upper Austria) is a former Austrian People's Party (ÖVP) politician and former Federal Minister of the Interior in Austria (2000–2004), Member of the European Parliament (2009–2011) and bearer of the "Grand Decoration of Honour in Gold with Sash". Since 2014, he works as an Entrepreneur in the Mergers and acquisitions sector and is also a hotel owner.

== Personal life ==
Ernst Strasser was born in 1956 as the son of farmers in Upper Austria. After the elementary school in Grieskirchen, he attended the "Bundesgymnasium und Sportrealgymnasium HIB Saalfelden" and later the upper school in "BORG Grieskirchen", where he graduated in 1975 as a school spokesman. Between 1971 and 1975, he was involved in Catholic youth organisations in Grieskirchen. Ernst Strasser studied Jurisprudence at the University of Salzburg between 1975 and 1980 and graduated there to the Doctor of Laws in 1981. During his studies he was a member of the main committee of the students union at the University of Salzburg as well as social referent of the same organisation. From 1980 to 1981 he did community service as an alternative to military service.

In 1998, Ernst Strasser was elected president of Hilfswerk Österreich, the largest health care aid organisation in Lower Austria, that provides help for children and adolescents with more than 4,000 employees and over 20,000 clients. The focus of his term until 2011 was the relocation of the state office in the government district to St. Pölten, the establishment of home service, the establishment of the visit service for older citizens, the opening of the first company kindergarten in Lower Austria, the launch of the "Lower Austrian women's telephone" as well as the consolidation and securing of financing of the organisation.

Ernst Strasser is married to Elisabeth Strasser, who brought two children into the marriage. The couple lives in Vienna and Bad Ischl.

== Professional career ==
After completing his military service, Ernst Strasser began his career as a secretary of the Austrian Farmers' Association under the former director Josef Riegler. Then he moved to the legal department of the Upper Austrian Farmers' Union, where he took over the position of a Federal Minister two years later. After the election of Josef Riegler to the leader of the Austrian People's Party, Ernst Strasser followed him and worked as an office manager of the chairman until 1990.

From 1990 to 1991 he was head of strategic planning of Umdasch AG in Amstetten and then from 1991 to 1992 managing director of Shop Concept-Mittelraum (Umdasch AG) in Heidelberg.

After his retirement as a minister, Ernst Strasser was appointed to the advisory board of the Österreichische Staatsdruckerei. Between 2005 and 2008 Strasser was Managing Partner at VCP Energy Holdings, a subsidiary of Vienna Capital Partners. and from 2006 to 2014 he was Managing Partner at GP-Beteiligungs- und Verwaltung GesmbH. Until March 2011, Ernst Strasser was also a member of the supervisory board of Westbahn and G4S. In addition, he has been an authorised representative of SCCB Consulting & Coaching since 2016.

In May 2019, Ernst Strasser took over the hotel Hubertushof in Bad Ischl.

== Political functions and mandates ==
From 1983 to 1985 Ernst Strasser was member of the municipal council of Grieskirchen. Between 1993 and 2000 he was member of the Landtag of Lower Austria and also chairman (1998–2000) of the Austrian People's Party (ÖVP) in Lower Austria. Between June 2003 and December 2004, Strasser was member of the Österreich Konvent.

From July 2009 to March 2011 Ernst Strasser was head of delegation of the Austrian People's Party in the European Parliament.

In addition he was representative of Lower Austria on the "ORF Board of Trustees". Strasser has also been the president of the Austro-Russian Friendship Society (Österreichisch-Russische Freundschaftsgesellschaft) since 2003.

From December 2002 to April 2003 Ernst Strasser was member of the National Council of the Austrian People's Party. He was Federal Minister of the Interior of Austria between 2000 and 2004.

He led his party in the 2009 European Parliament election. He was a Member of the European Parliament between 2009 and 2011. He was sentenced to 4 years jail as consequence of the 2011 cash for laws scandal.

== Lobbying ==
Der Standard newspaper's investigations in Ernst Strasser found that Strasser has many business holdings and listed some of these activities. Strasser founded Consulting, Coaching & Educating-GesmbH (CCE) in 2005. It is a one-man company 100% owned by Strasser. For the first two years, the CCE recorded a profit of around 380,000 euros. When the newspaper studied the holdings in May 2009, more recent data was missing from the commercial register. The company owns stakes in various other companies.

One company, Business Consulting & Development GmbH, is said to have imported olive oil from Syria. Another company had links to Hungarian bribery investigations.

Strasser's CCE owns stakes in Russland-Connection Anteile as well as Firmen Advisory Partners (registered in Innsbruck), Konti Holding (registered in Wien) and Expert Management Beratung Russia (registered in Vienna).

On 20 March 2011, Britain's Sunday Times reported that three MEPs, including Austria's Ernst Strasser, had accepted offers of up to 100,000 euros ($141,000) per year in exchange for proposing amendments in the EU parliament.

Austrian vice-chancellor and ÖVP leader Josef Pröll had called for the deputy's "immediate resignation from all political posts," describing his behaviour as "unacceptable". After initially fighting the claims, Strasser announced his resignation on Sunday, noting: "I have decided to take this step because there has been a campaign against me in Austria" and this was "damaging the People's Party."

On 14 January 2013, Strasser was sentenced to 4 years jail.

== Honours and achievements ==
- 2002 Order of St. Gregory the Great
- 2003 Grand Decoration of Honour in Gold with Sash

== See also ==
- Austria–Russia relations
- Vienna Capital Partners
