= Wanhua Industrial Group =

Chinese investment holding company in chemical industry

Wanhua Industrial Group Co., Ltd.
- Formerly: 烟台万华华信合成革有限公司
- Company type: Mixed government-private ownership
- Industry: Holding company
- Founded: 29 October 2001 in Yantai
- Founder: Wanhua Group Corporation; China Huarong; China Cinda
- Headquarters: Yantai, China
- Area served: China
- Total assets: RMB6.774 billion (2018)
- Total equity: RMB4.930 billion (2018)
- Owner: Yantai Guofeng (39.497%)
Subsidiaries
BorsodChem	(former)
Wanhua Chemical Group	(former)

Chinese name
- Simplified Chinese: 万华实业集团有限公司
- Hanyu Pinyin: Wànhuá shíyè jítuán yǒuxiàn gōngsī
- Literal meaning: Wanhua Industrial Group, limited company
Transcriptions
Standard Mandarin
- Hanyu Pinyin: Wànhuá shíyè jítuán yǒuxiàn gōngsī

former name
- Simplified Chinese: 烟台万华华信合成革有限公司
- Hanyu Pinyin: Yāntái wànhuá huáxìn héchénggé yǒuxiàn gōngsī
- Literal meaning: Yantai Wanhua Hua[rong]–Cin[da] synthetic leather limited company
Transcriptions
Standard Mandarin
- Hanyu Pinyin: Yāntái wànhuá huáxìn héchénggé yǒuxiàn gōngsī
- Website: wanhuagroup.com
- Footnotes / references source of data: Yantai's SASAC

Wanhua Industrial Group Co., Ltd. is a Chinese holding company. It was the parent company of Wanhua Chemical Group and BorsodChem until 2018. Yantai Municipal People's Government, via Yantai Guofeng, still owned 39.497% stake of the company as of 2017. The government also sold 25% stake of the company to a consortium of Pemex and Deutsche Bank in 2007.

== History ==
=== Predecessors ===
==== Yantai synthetic leather factory ====
The predecessor of Wanhua Group Corporation, was Yantai synthetic leather factory (Chinese: 烟台合成革总厂 or Chinese: 烟台合成革厂). The plan to build the factory was approved by the State Development Planning Commission in 1978. The construction started in 1980 and completed in 1983. The manufacturing technology was imported from Japan (from Nippon Polyurethane Industry according to C&EN) and was the first synthetic polyurethane leather factory of China.

In 1988, the ownership of the factory was transferred from the Ministry of Light Industry of the People's Republic of China to the Yantai Municipal People's Government.

==== Wanhua Group Corporation ====
In 1995, the factory was re-incorporated as a limited company as 烟台万华合成革集团有限公司, or in short, Wanhua Group Corporation (Chinese: 万华集团公司).

In 1998, a subsidiary Yantai Wanhua Polyurethane (now Wanhua Chemical Group) was formed. The subsidiary owned the methylene diphenyl diisocyanate production line of the factory. However, Wanhua Group Corporation retained several production line such as the supply chain of liquid chlorine, sodium hydroxide, pure water, steam vapour and electricity. The subsidiary became a listed company in January 2001.

In October 2001, Wanhua Group Corporation formed another subsidiary Wanhua Industrial Group (see section below). In 2015, 39.497% shares of Wanhua Industrial Group was transferred from Wanhua Group Corporation to its parent State-owned Assets Supervision and Administration Commission (SASAC) of the Yantai Municipal People's Government, making Wanhua Group Corporation and Wanhua Industrial Group were sister companies.

As of 2019, Wanhua Group is a live company. It owned the shares of Yantai Wanhua Hospital as well as other assets.

=== Wanhua Industrial Group ===
==== Foundation and privatization ====
In October 2001, Wanhua Group Corporation formed another subsidiary Wanhua Industrial Group (founded as 烟台万华华信合成革有限公司, known as 烟台万华实业集团有限公司 since 2008) as part of a debt-to-equity swap. Central Government owned bad banks managers China Huarong (Chinese: 华融; pinyin: Huáróng) and China Cinda (Chinese: 信达; pinyin: Xìndá) were the minority shareholders. Cinda and Huarong later sold the shares of Wanhua Industrial Group.

According to the company itself, Wanhua Group Corporation injected all the assets to Wanhua Industrial Group at the time of the debt-to-equity swap, which including the shares of Yantai Wanhua Polyurethane, Yantai Huali (Chinese: 烟台华力热电股份有限公司; pinyin: Yāntái huálì rèdiàn gǔfèn yǒuxiàn gōngsī), Wanhua Microfiber (Chinese: 万华超纤), etc.

Wanhua Industrial Group was the direct parent company of the listed company Yantai Wanhua Polyurethane since 2001 and effective in March 2003. Wanhua Industrial Group still owned 47.92% shares of the listed company as of 31 December 2017, before another company shake up in January 2018.

Yantai Huali was a combined steam and electric power supplier of the listed company.

In 2007, the Yantai city-owned Wanhua Group Corporation sold a further 25% stake of Wanhua Industrial Group to a consortium of Pemex, Deutsche Bank and one other investor. After the deal, as of 2007, Wanhua Group Corporation owned 50.50% shares of Wanhua Industrial Group, the aforementioned consortium, via a BVI company Prime Partner International Limited, owned 25%, and the rest (24.58%) was owned by Yantai Huali.

By 2005, Yantai Huali was significantly (37.60%) owned by Wanhua Industrial Group. It was followed by Wanhua Group Corporation for 31.94% shares as well as employee stock ownership for the rest of the shares. But since December 2006, Yantai Huali was majority owned by the managers of the listed company. Yantai Huali acquired 15.04% shares of Wanhua Industrial Group from Huarong in 2005 and 9.54% shares from Cinda in 2006. The change in ownership of Yantai Huali, as well as acquiring the shares of Wanhua Industrial Group, was considered as an indirect employee stock ownership of the listed company.

In 2013, Wanhua Industrial Group recapitalized another RMB4 billion and diluting the stake of the existing shareholders.

==== BorsodChem acquisition ====
Wanhua Industrial Group was interested to buy Hungarian company BorsodChem in the late 2000s. By 2009, Wanhua Industrial Group already acquired about two-thirds of mezzanine capital of the BorsodChem.

In 2011, Wanhua Industrial Group formally acquired BorsodChem. It was the biggest Chinese outbound investment deal in Hungary. The buyout of BorsodChem from private equity firms Permira and Vienna Capital Partners came at a financially bleak time for BorsodChem and allowed the company to avoid laying off its 2700 employees. The parent companies of the listed company, also hired the listed company to manage BorsodChem from 2011 to circa 2019.

==== split and reverse IPO ====
In 2017, the State-owned Assets Supervision and Administration Commission (SASAC) of the Yantai Municipal People's Government, transferred 39.497% stake of Wanhua Industrial Group to another city government-owned company Yantai Guofeng (Chinese: 烟台国丰投资控股有限公司; pinyin: Yāntái guófēng tóuzī kònggǔ yǒuxiàn gōngsī). Yantai's SASAC acquired the aforementioned stake from its subsidiary Wanhua Group Corporation in 2015. (see above section)

In January 2018 Wanhua Industrial Group was split into two companies: the surviving Wanhua Industrial Group as well as 烟台万华化工有限公司 (pinyin: Yāntái wànhuá huàgōng; lit. 'Wanhua chemical industry', 'limited company'). The latter became the new largest shareholder of the listed company instead. The latter also owned the assets that directly related to polyurethane production, including BorsodChem. However, the latter also reverse merged with the listed company in February 2019.

As of 31 December 2018, after the split, Wanhua Industrial Group had a net assets of RMB4.930 billion. It owned 33.07% shares of Wanhua EnergySave Science and Technical Group (Chinese: 万华节能科技集团 or known as WanhuaEnergySav Science Technical Group) The shares of that company were formerly traded in Chinese OTC system National Equities Exchange and Quotations as NEEQ:838261 until June 2018.

The company also owned 15.56% shares of Wanhua Microfiber as of 2018.
