= Wanhua Chemical Group =

Chinese company

Wanhua Chemical Group Co., Ltd.
- Wanhua Group logo (shared with sister companies)
- Formerly: Yantai Wanhua Polyurethane; Yantai Wanhua Polyurethanes
- Company type: Public
- Traded as: SSE: 600309; SSE 50 Component; CSI A50
- ISIN: CNE0000016J9
- Industry: Chemical
- Founded: 16 December 1998 in Yantai
- Founder: Wanhua Group Corporation and other investors
- Headquarters: Yantai, China
- Area served: China; Hungary; exported Worldwide
- Key people: Liao Zengtai (Chairman & Secretary of Party Committee)
- Products: polymers, e.g.; Methylene diphenyl diisocyanate
- Revenue: ▼RMB68,050 million (2019)
- Net income: ▼RMB10,130 million (2019)
- Total assets: ▲RMB96,865 million (2019)
- Total equity: ▲RMB42,364 million (2019)
Owner
Yantai Guofeng*	(21.59%)
Prime Partner Int'l	(10.70%)
中诚投资*	(10.52%)
中凯信创业投资*	(9.61%)
- Number of employees: ▲27000 (2023)
- Subsidiaries: BorsodChem, etc.

Chinese name
- Simplified Chinese: 万华化学集团股份有限公司
- Literal meaning: Wanhua Chemical Group, Company limited by shares
Transcriptions

short name
- Simplified Chinese: 万华化学
- Literal meaning: Wanhua Chemical
Transcriptions

former name
- Simplified Chinese: 烟台万华聚氨酯股份有限公司
Transcriptions

former short name
- Simplified Chinese: 烟台万华
Transcriptions
Rating
Baa2	(Moody's, March 2019)
BBB	(S&P Global, November 2018)
- Website: en.whchem.com
- Footnotes / references source of data: annual report; in consolidated financial statement; profit and equity excluding minority interest; in Chinese accounting standards; owners marked with "*" are in the same shareholders' agreement

Wanhua Chemical Group Co., Ltd. known as Wanhua Chemical and formerly Yantai Wanhua Polyurethane or Yantai Wanhua Polyurethanes or Yantai Wanhua, is a Chinese listed company in chemical industry.

== History ==
The listed company was incorporated in 1998 as Yantai Wanhua Polyurethane Co., Ltd. (Chinese: 烟台万华聚氨酯股份有限公司). Co-founder of the company, Wanhua Group Corporation (Chinese: 万华集团公司 or 烟台万华合成革集团有限公司), initially owned 93.25% shares. The company started its initial public offering in December 2000. The shares started to trade in the Shanghai Stock Exchange in January 2001.

Initially, the listed company only owned the methylene diphenyl diisocyanate (MDI) production line of the former Yantai synthetic leather factory. It was a common practice at that time to list part of the assets instead of the whole conglomerate. The size of the listed company expanded beyond that assets, however.

That MDI production line was replaced by a new one in 2014, also located in Yantai. The company also imported technology from Honeywell for its Yantai plant in 2018.

In 2017, the shares of the listed company became a constituent of the blue-chip index SSE 50.

In February 2019, the listed company acquired Hungarian company BorsodChem and other assets, via a reverse merger with the largest shareholder of the listed company in an all-share deal that worth RMB52 billion.

In July 2019, the listed company acquired Swedish company Chematur Technologies for a reported US$134 million from Jilin-based Kangnaier Investment Group (Chinese: 吉林市康乃尔投资集团; also transliterated as Connell Chemical Industry LLC) and another investor. In the same month, the listed company formed a shipping joint venture with Abu Dhabi National Oil Company (ADNOC).

== Businesses ==
Wanhua Chemical Group is one of the largest chemical producers of the world. According to Chemical & Engineering News (C&EN), the listed company is ranked the 37th in 2018 edition of the ranking, up from the 41st in 2017 edition. As of 2019, it is the world's largest producer of the polyurethane raw material methylene diphenyl diisocyanate (MDI). According to another source, the listed company is the second largest producer of the world for aliphatic diisocyanate (ADI) as well as the largest producer of China for toluene diisocyanate (TDI).

The company is ranked the 820th in 2019 edition of Forbes Global 2000.

On top of the production facility in Yantai, the company also has factories in Ningbo, Zhuhai and Meishan. Since 2019, the company expanded into Hungary. The company also announced a plan to build a factory in Convent, Louisiana, the US in November 2018. However, C&EN and SCMP reported that the plan may be revised in 2019. The proposal plant also faced opposition from the residents of St. James Parish, including Sharon Lavigne, as well as change in costs due to multiple factors, such as tariff of raw material due to the China–United States trade war.

=== BorsodChem ===
In February 2011, the parent company of the listed company, Wanhua Industrial Group Co., Ltd. (Chinese: 万华实业集团有限公司), acquired Hungarian chemical maker BorsodChem for a reported US$1.66 billion (€1.2 billion). The parent company also hired the listed subsidiary to manage BorsodChem from 2011 to 2019.

In February 2019, Wanhua Chemical Group made a reverse merger with its direct parent company at that time, 烟台万华化工有限公司. That company also owned the shares of BorsodChem.

== Shareholders ==
The parent company and largest shareholder of the listed company was Yantai-city government owned Wanhua Group Corporation in 1998. From 2003, Wanhua Group Corporation's non wholly owned subsidiary Wanhua Industrial Group became the direct parent company, which was the largest shareholder until January 2018.

In January 2018, the parent company was split into two companies: Wanhua Industrial Group and 烟台万华化工有限公司 (pinyin: Yāntái wànhuá huàgōng; lit. 'Yantai Wanhua chemical industry', 'limited company'). The latter became the new largest shareholder of the listed company instead. At that time, that company owned 47.92% shares of Wanhua Chemical Group.

However, in February 2019, the listed company merged with its largest shareholder, with the listed company is the surviving entity.

Another company, Yantai Guofeng (Chinese: 烟台国丰投资控股有限公司; pinyin: Yāntái guófēng tóuzī kònggǔ yǒuxiàn gōngsī), became the new largest shareholder of the listed company for 21.56% stake since February 2019 and increased to 21.59% as of 31 December 2019. Yantai Guofeng is owned by the State-owned Assets Supervision and Administration Commission (SASAC) of the Yantai Municipal People's Government. Yantai's SASAC also indirectly owned the former parent company of the listed company, Wanhua Industrial Group, at the same time. Yantai Guofeng owned 39.497% stake of Wanhua Industrial Group since 2017. Yantai Guofeng also formed a shareholders' agreement with the third and fourth largest shareholder of the listed company, which they were owned by the managers and employees of the listed company directly and indirectly. As of 31 December 2019, the third (Chinese: 烟台中诚投资) and fourth largest shareholder (Chinese: 宁波市中凯信创业投资) owned 10.52% and 9.61% shares respectively.

Prime Partner International Limited, a consortium founded in 2007 by Pemex, Deutsche Bank and one other investor, was the second largest shareholder of the listed company, as of 2019, for 10.70% shares. However, the direct parent company of that consortium, had changed to Dao Sheng (Hong Kong) Limited in 2017. Prime Partner International was the shareholder of Wanhua Industrial Group in 2007, thus the consortium was an indirect owner of the listed company from that date.
