= Specific inhalation challenge =

The specific inhalation challenge (SIC) is a diagnosis tool to assess airway responsiveness to "sensitizing" substances as opposed to nonspecific stimuli such as pharmacological agents (i.e. histamine, methacholine), cold air and exercise. Subjects are exposed to a suspected occupational agent in a controlled way under close supervision in a hospital laboratory. The specific inhalation challenges has been considered as the gold standard in confirming the diagnosis of occupational asthma.

== Methods ==
One of the steps of SIC is to perform a challenge with the suspected asthmagen. Then, FEV_{1} is subsequently measured using another device and compared to a baseline. A positive response is usually a decrease in baseline FEV_{1} of 15 to 20 percent.

=== Realistic method ===
The realistic method was developed in the 1970s. The patient enters a sealed chamber and is exposed to the suspected agent in a controlled, non-work, test environment. The asthmagen can be water-soluble and nebulized. If the agent is non-soluble, the patient tips the agent from one tray to another in an attempt to mimic the work environment. This method has the advantage of being able to assess, albeit highly subjectively, ocular and nasal symptoms as well as a reduction in FEV_{1}.

There are, however, disadvantages to the method. First, SIC is currently only conducted in specialty facilities because the facilities and equipment are rare and expensive. Second, the realistic method may exposed the patient to huge concentrations of particles, resulting in unduly severe asthma attacks. Alternately, the agent can be delivered using the recently developed closed-circuit technique.

=== Closed-circuit method ===
This test requires the patient to breathe aerosols of the suspected agent (asthmagen) through an oro-facial mask or mouth piece. These asthmagens are aerosolized using closed-circuit chambers, and the quantities and concentrations administered being minute and extremely stable minimize the risk of exaggerated responses.

== See also ==
- Occupational asthma
