= Aminoethylethanolamine =

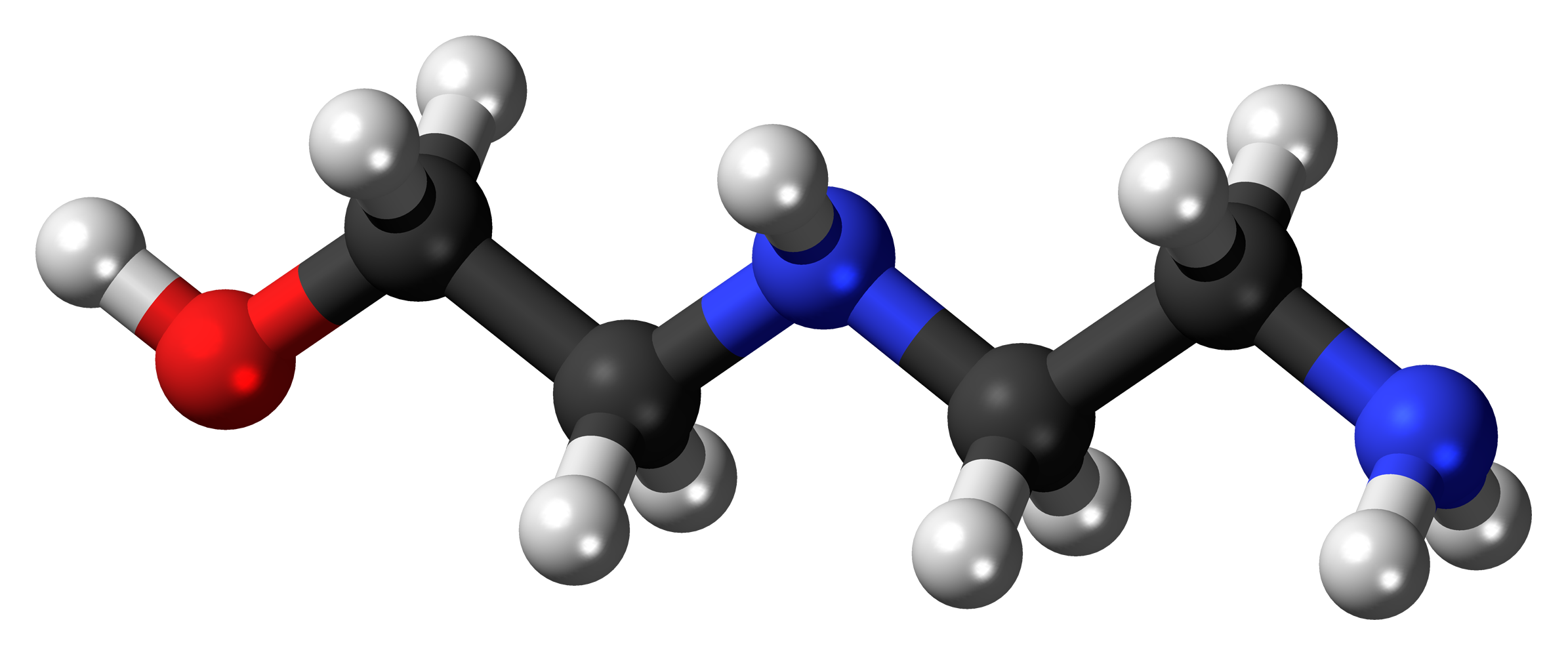

Names
- Preferred IUPAC name 2-[(2-Aminoethyl)amino]ethan-1-ol
- Other names N-(2-Hydroxyethyl)ethylenediamine

Identifiers
CAS Number	111-41-1
3D model (JSmol)	Interactive image
ChemSpider	7821
ECHA InfoCard	100.003.516
PubChem CID	8112
UNII	RC78W6NPXT
CompTox Dashboard (EPA)	DTXSID7025423
- InChI: InChI=1S/C4H12N2O/c5-1-2-6-3-4-7/h6-7H,1-5H2 Key: LHIJANUOQQMGNT-UHFFFAOYSA-N; InChI=1/C4H12N2O/c5-1-2-6-3-4-7/h6-7H,1-5H2 Key: LHIJANUOQQMGNT-UHFFFAOYAR
- SMILES: OCCNCCN

Properties
Chemical formula	C_{4}H_{12}N_{2}O
Molar mass	104.153 g·mol^{−1}
Density	1.03 g/cm^{3}
Melting point	−28 °C (−18 °F; 245 K)
Boiling point	243 °C (469 °F; 516 K)
Vapor pressure	0.01 mmHg @ 20 °C; 8.17×10^{−4}mmHg @ 25 °C

Hazards
NFPA 704 (fire diamond)	2 1 0
Flash point	132 °C (270 °F; 405 K)
Autoignition temperature	368 °C (694 °F; 641 K)
- Except where otherwise noted, data are given for materials in their standard state (at 25 °C [77 °F], 100 kPa). verify (what is ?) Infobox references

Aminoethylethanolamine or AEEA is an organic base used in the industrial manufacture of fuel and oil additives, chelating agents, and surfactants.

== Synthesis ==
AEEA may be produced by the ethoxylation of ethylenediamine in the presence of water. Multiple ethoxylations result in undesirable byproducts, so the reaction is conducted with an excess of diamine.
