= Poly(ethylene adipate) =

Identifiers
CAS Number	24938-37-2

Properties
Chemical formula	-(OCH_{2}CH_{2}O_{2}CCH_{2}CH_{2}CH_{2}CH_{2}CO)-_{n}
Melting point	55 °C (131 °F; 328 K)
Boiling point	200 °C (392 °F; 473 K)
- Except where otherwise noted, data are given for materials in their standard state (at 25 °C [77 °F], 100 kPa). Infobox references

Poly(ethylene adipate) or PEA is an aliphatic polyester. It is most commonly synthesized from a polycondensation reaction between ethylene glycol and adipic acid. PEA has been studied as it is biodegradable through a variety of mechanisms and also fairly inexpensive compared to other polymers. Its lower molecular weight compared to many polymers aids in its biodegradability.

== Synthesis ==
=== Polycondensation ===
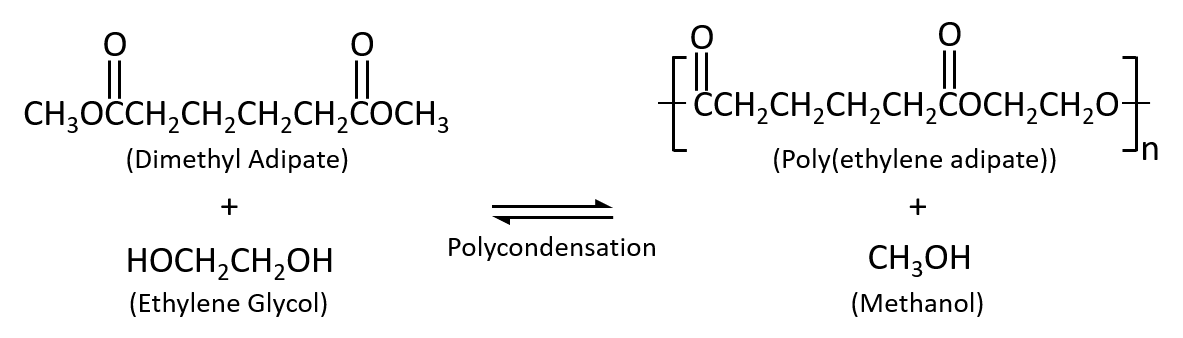
Polycondensation synthesis of poly(ethylene adipate).

Poly(ethylene adipate) can be synthesized through a variety of methods. First, it could be formed from the polycondensation of dimethyl adipate and ethylene glycol mixed in equal amounts and subjected to increasing temperatures (100 °C, then 150 °C, and finally 180 °C) under nitrogen atmosphere. Methanol is released as a byproduct of this polycondensation reaction and must be distilled off. Second, a melt condensation of ethylene glycol and adipic acid could be carried out at 190-200 °C under nitrogen atmosphere. Lastly, a two-step reaction between adipic acid and ethylene glycol can be carried out. A polyesterification reaction is carried out first followed by polycondensation in the presence of a catalyst. Both of these steps are carried out at 190 °C or above. Many different catalysts can be used such as stannous chloride and tetraisopropyl orthotitanate. Generally, the PEA is then dissolved in a small amount of chloroform followed by precipitation out in methanol.

=== Ring-opening polymerization ===
An alternate and less frequently used method of synthesizing PEA is ring-opening polymerization. Cyclic oligo(ethylene adipate) can be mixed with di-n-butyltin in chloroform. This requires temperatures similar to melt condensation.

== Properties ==
PEA has a density of 1.183 g/mL at 25 °C and it is soluble in benzene and tetrahydrofuran. PEA has a glass transition temperature of -50 °C. PEA can come in a high molecular weight or low molecular weight variety, i.e.10,000 or 1,000 Da. Further properties can be broken down into the following categories.

=== Mechanical properties ===
In general, most aliphatic polyesters have poor mechanical properties and PEA is no exception. Little research has been done on the mechanical properties of pure PEA but one study found PEA to have a tensile modulus of 312.8 MPa, a tensile strength of 13.2 MPa, and an elongation at break of 362.1%. Alternate values that have been found are a tensile strength of ~10 MPa and a tensile modulus of ~240 MPa.

=== Chemical properties ===
IR spectra for PEA show two peaks at 1715–1750 cm^{−1}, another at 1175–1250 cm^{−1}, and a last notable peak at 2950 cm^{−1}. These peaks can be easily determined to be from ester groups, COOC bonds, and CH bonds respectively.

=== Crystallization properties ===
Structure of a polymer spherulite.

PEA has been shown to be able to form both ring-banded and Maltese-cross (or ring-less) type spherulites. Ring-banded spherulites most notably form when crystallization is carried out between 27 °C and 34 °C whereas Maltese-cross spherulites form outside of those temperatures. Regardless of the manner of banding, PEA polymer chains pack into a monoclinic crystal structure (some polymers may pack into multiple crystal structures but PEA does not). The length of the crystal edges are given as follows: a = 0.547 nm, b = 0.724 nm, and c = 1.55 nm. The monoclinic angle, α, is equal to 113.5°. The bands formed by PEA have been said to resemble corrugation, much like a butterfly wing or Pollia fruit skin.

=== Electrical properties ===
Conductivity of films made of PEA mixed with salts was found to exceed that of PEO_{4.5}LiCF_{3}SO_{3} and of poly(ethylene succinate)/LiBF_{4} suggesting it could be a practical candidate for use in lithium-ion batteries. Notably, PEA is used as a plasticizer and therefore amorphous flows occur at fairly low temperatures rendering it less plausible for use in electrical applications. Blends of PEA with polymers such as poly(vinyl acetate) showed improved mechanical properties at elevated temperatures.

=== Miscibility ===
PEA is miscible with a number of polymers including: poly(L-lactide) (PLLA), poly(butylene adipate) (PBA), poly(ethylene oxide), tannic acid (TA), and poly(butylene succinate) (PBS). PEA is not miscible with low density polyethylene (LDPE). Miscibility is determined by the presence of only a single glass transition temperature being present in a polymer mixture.

== Degradability ==
=== Biodegradability ===
Aliphatic copolyesters are well known for their biodegradability by lipases and esterases as well as some strains of bacteria. PEA in particular is well degraded by hog liver esterase, Rh. delemar, Rh. arrhizus, P. cepacia, R. oryzae, and Aspergillus sp. An important property in the speed of degradation is the crystallinity of the polymer. Neat PEA has been shown to have a slightly lower degradation rate than copolymers due to a loss in crystallinity. PEA/poly(ethylene furanoate) (PEF) copolymers at high PEA concentrations were shown to degrade within 30 days while neat PEA had not fully degraded, however, mixtures approaching 50/50 mol% hardly degrade at all in the presence of lipases. Copolymerizing styrene glycol with adipic acid and ethylene glycol can result in phenyl side chains being added to PEA. Adding phenyl side chains increases steric hindrance causing a decrease in the crystallinity in the PEA resulting in an increase in biodegradability but also a notable loss in mechanical properties.

Further work has shown that decreasing crystallinity is more important to degradation carried out in water than whether or not a polymer is hydrophobic or hydrophilic. PEA polymerized with 1,2-butanediol or 1,2-decanediol had an increased biodegradability rate over PBS copolymerized with the same side branches. Again, this was attributed to a greater loss in crystallinity as PEA was more affected by steric hindrance, even though it is more hydrophobic than PBS.

Poly(ethylene adipate) urethane combined with small amounts of ligin can aid in preventing degradation by acting as an antioxidant. Additionally, the mechanical properties of the PEA urethane increased by ligin addition. This is thought to be due to the rigid nature of ligin which aids in reinforcing soft polymers such as PEA urethane.

When PEA degrades, it has been shown that cyclic oligomers are the highest fraction of formed byproducts.

=== Ultrasonic degradation ===
Using toluene as a solvent, the efficacy of degrading PEA through ultrasonic sound waves was examined. Degradation of a polymer chain occurs due to cavitation of the liquid leading to scission of chemical chains. In the case of PEA, degradation was not observed due to ultrasonic sound waves. This was determined to be likely due to PEA not having a high enough molar mass to warrant degradation via these means. A low molecular weight has been indicated as being necessary for the biodegradation of polymers.

== Applications ==
=== Plasticizer ===
Poly(ethylene adipate) can effectively be used as a plasticizer reducing the brittleness of other polymers. Adding PEA to PLLA was shown to reduce the brittleness of PLLA significantly more than poly(butylene adipate) (PBA), poly(hexamethylene adipate) (PHA), and poly(diethylene adipate) (PDEA) but reduced the mechanical strength. The elongation at break was increased approximately 65x over neat PLLA. The thermal stability of PLLA also showed a significant increase with an increasing concentration of PEA.

PEA has also been shown to increase the plasticity and flexibility of the terpolymer maleic anhydride-styrene-methyl metacrylate (MAStMMA). Observing the changes in thermal expansion coefficient allowed for the increasing in plasticity to be determined for this copolymer blend.

=== Mending capabilities ===
Self-healing polymers is an effective method of healing microcracks caused by an accumulation of stress. Diels-Alder (DA) bonds can be incorporated into a polymer allowing microcracks to occur preferentially along these weaker bonds. Furyl-telechelic poly(ethylene adipate) (PEAF_{2}) and tris-maleimide (M_{3}) can be combined through a DA reaction in order to bring about self-healing capabilities in PEAF_{2}. PEAF_{2}M_{3} was found to have some healing capabilities after 5 days at 60 °C, although significant evidence of the original cut appeared and the original mechanical properties were not fully restored.

=== Microcapsules for drug delivery ===
PEA microbeads intended for drug delivery can be made through water/oil/water double emulsion methods. By blending PEA with Poly-ε-caprolactone, beads can be given membrane porosity. Microbeads were placed into a variety of solutions including a synthetic stomach acid, pancreatin, Hank's buffer, and newborn calf serum. The degradation of the microcapsules and therefore the release of the drug was the greatest in newborn calf serum, followed by pancreatin, then synthetic stomach acid, and lastly Hank's buffer. The enhanced degradation in newborn calf serum and pancreatin was attributed to the presence of enzyme activity and that simple ester hydrolysis was able to be carried out. Additionally, an increase in pH is correlated with higher degradation rates.
