= Hexamethylene diisocyanate =

- Hexamethylene diisocyanate

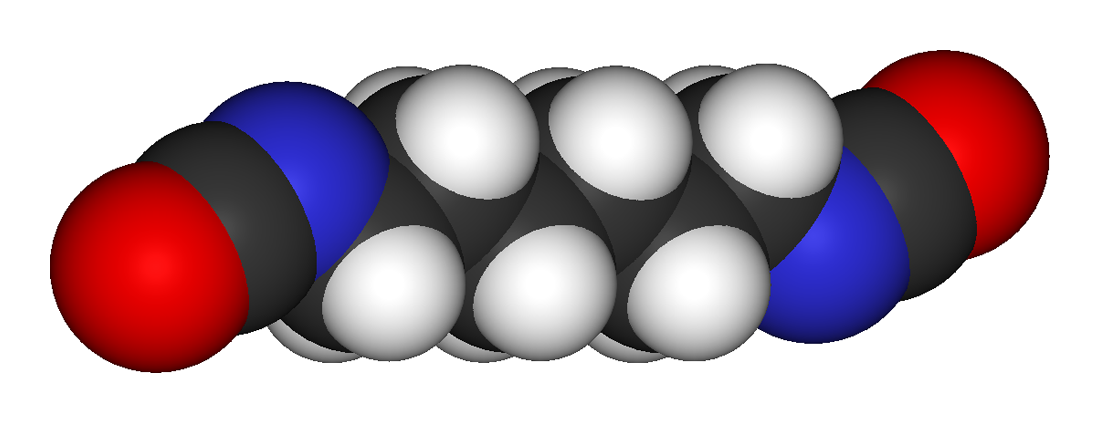
- Hexamethylene diisocyanate

Names
- Preferred IUPAC name 1,6-Diisocyanatohexane
- Other names HDI; 1,6-hexane diisocyanate

Identifiers
CAS Number	822-06-0
3D model (JSmol)	Interactive image
ChEBI	CHEBI:53578
ChemSpider	12637
ECHA InfoCard	100.011.350
IUPHAR/BPS	6291
PubChem CID	13192
UNII	0I70A3I1UF
CompTox Dashboard (EPA)	DTXSID4024143
- InChI: InChI=1S/C8H12N2O2/c11-7-9-5-3-1-2-4-6-10-8-12/h1-6H2 Key: RRAMGCGOFNQTLD-UHFFFAOYSA-N; InChI=1/C8H12N2O2/c11-7-9-5-3-1-2-4-6-10-8-12/h1-6H2 Key: RRAMGCGOFNQTLD-UHFFFAOYAI
- SMILES: O=C=N\CCCCCC/N=C=O

Properties
Chemical formula	C_{8}H_{12}N_{2}O_{2}
Molar mass	168.2 g/mol
Appearance	Colourless liquid
Odor	sharp, pungent
Density	1.047 g/cm^{3}, liquid
Melting point	−67 °C (−89 °F; 206 K)
Boiling point	255 °C (491 °F; 528 K)
Vapor pressure	0.05 mmHg (25 °C)
Viscosity	3 cP at 25 °C

Hazards
Flash point	130–140 °C (266–284 °F; 403–413 K) (Cleveland open cup)
- NIOSH (US health exposure limits)
PEL (Permissible)	none
REL (Recommended)	TWA 0.005 ppm (0.035 mg/m^{3}) C 0.020 ppm (0.140 mg/m^{3}) [10-minute]
IDLH (Immediate danger)	N.D.

Related compounds
Related isocyanates	Isophorone diisocyanate
- Except where otherwise noted, data are given for materials in their standard state (at 25 °C [77 °F], 100 kPa). verify (what is ?) Infobox references

Hexamethylene diisocyanate (HDI) is the organic compound with the formula (CH_{2})_{6}(NCO)_{2}. It is classified as an diisocyanate. It is a colorless liquid. It has sometimes been called HMDI but this not usually done to avoid confusion with Hydrogenated MDI.

== Synthesis ==
Compared to other commercial diisocyanates, HDI is produced in relatively small quantities, accounting for (with isophorone diisocyanate) only 3.4% of the global diisocyanate market in the year 2000. It is produced by phosgenation of hexamethylene diamine.

== Applications ==
Aliphatic diisocyanates are used in specialty applications, such as enamel coatings which are resistant to abrasion and degradation by ultraviolet light. These properties are particularly desirable in, for instance, the exterior paint applied to aircraft and vessels. HDI is also sold oligomerized as the trimer or biuret which are used in automotive refinish coatings. Although more viscous in these forms, it reduces the volatility and toxicity. At least 3 companies sell material in this form commercially. It is also used as an activator in process of in situ polymerization of caprolactam i.e. cast nylon process. HDI is also used bisoxazolidine synthesis as the hydroxyl group on the molecule allows for further reaction with hexamethylene diisocyanate.

== Toxicity ==
HDI is considered toxic, and its pulmonary toxicity has been studied as well as its oligomers.

== See also ==
- Isophorone diisocyanate
- Methylene diphenyl diisocyanate
- Toluene diisocyanate
