= Methylene diphenyl diisocyanate =

Aromatic diisocyanate

4,4′-Methylene diphenyl diisocyanate
- 4,4'-methylene diphenyl diisocyanate

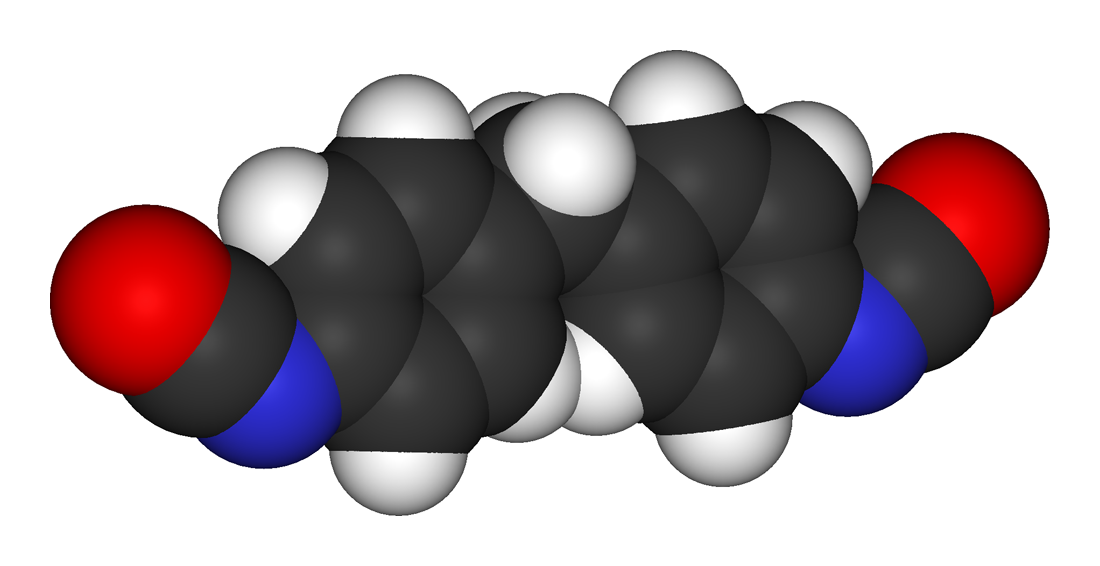

Names
- Preferred IUPAC name 1,1′-Methylenebis(4-isocyanatobenzene)
- Other names: Bis(4-isocyanatophenyl)methane; 1-Isocyanato-4-[(4-isocyanatophenyl)methyl]benzene; 4,4′-Methylene diphenyl diisocyanate; 4,4′-Diphenylmethane diisocyanate; Bayer Desmodur 44; Methylene bis(4-phenyl isocyanate); Pure MDI

Identifiers
CAS Number	101-68-8
3D model (JSmol)	Interactive image; Interactive image
ChEBI	CHEBI:53218
ChemSpider	7289
ECHA InfoCard	100.043.361
EC Number	4,4'-: 202-966-0
PubChem CID	7570
RTECS number	NQ9350000
UNII	B0LO6BBS8C
- InChI: InChI=1S/C15H10N2O2/c18-10-16-14-5-1-12(2-6-14)9-13-3-7-15(8-4-13)17-11-19/h1-8H,9H2 Key: UPMLOUAZCHDJJD-UHFFFAOYSA-N
- SMILES: O=C=NC(C=C2)=CC=C2CC1=CC=C(N=C=O)C=C1; O=C=N\c1ccc(cc1)Cc2ccc(\N=C=O)cc2

Properties
Chemical formula	C_{15}H_{10}N_{2}O_{2}
Molar mass	250.25 g/mol
Appearance	White or pale yellow solid
Density	1.230 g/cm^{3}, solid
Melting point	40 °C (104 °F; 313 K)
Boiling point	314 °C (597 °F; 587 K)
Solubility in water	Reacts
Vapor pressure	0.000005 mmHg (20 °C)

Hazards
- GHS labelling
Pictograms	(GHS07: Exclamation mark) (GHS08: Health hazard)
Signal word	Danger
Hazard statements	H315, H317, H319, H332, H334, H335, H351, H373
Precautionary statements	P201, P202, P260, P264, P271, P272, P280, P281, P285, P302+P352, P304+P312, P304+P340, P304+P341, P305+P351+P338, P308+P313, P312, P314, P321, P332+P313, P333+P313, P337+P313, P342+P311, P362, P363, P403+P233, P405, P501
Flash point	212–214 °C (Cleveland open cup)
- Lethal dose or concentration (LD, LC)
LD_{50} (median dose)	2200 mg/kg (mouse, oral)
LD_{Lo} (lowest published)	31,690 mg/kg (rat, oral)
LC_{50} (median concentration)	369 mg/m^{3} (rat, 4 hr); 380 mg/m^{3} (rat, 4 hr); 178 mg/m^{3} (rat)
- NIOSH (US health exposure limits)
PEL (Permissible)	C 0.2 mg/m^{3} (0.02 ppm)
REL (Recommended)	TWA 0.05 mg/m^{3} (0.005 ppm) C 0.2 mg/m^{3} (0.020 ppm) [10-minute]
IDLH (Immediate danger)	75 mg/m^{3}

Related compounds
Related Isocyanates	Toluene diisocyanate; Naphthalene diisocyanate; Hexamethylene diisocyanate; Isophorone diisocyanate
Related compounds	Polyurethane
- Except where otherwise noted, data are given for materials in their standard state (at 25 °C [77 °F], 100 kPa). verify (what is ?) Infobox references

Methylene diphenyl diisocyanate (MDI) is an aromatic diisocyanate. Three isomers are common, varying by the positions of the isocyanate groups around the rings: 2,2′-MDI, 2,4′-MDI, and 4,4′-MDI. The 4,4′ isomer is most widely used, and is also known as 4,4′-diphenylmethane diisocyanate. This isomer is also known as Pure MDI. MDI reacts with polyols in the manufacture of polyurethane. It is the most produced diisocyanate, accounting for 61.3% of the global market in the year 2000.

== Production ==
Total world production of MDI and polymeric MDI is over 7.5 million tonnes per year (in 2017).

As of 2019, the largest producer was Wanhua Chemical Group. Other major producers are Covestro, BASF, Dow, Huntsman, Tosoh, Kumho Mitsui Chemicals.

The first step of the production of MDI is the reaction of aniline and formaldehyde, using hydrochloric acid as a catalyst to produce 4,4'-Methylenedianiline and other diamine precursors, as well as their corresponding polyamines:

Then, these diamines are treated with phosgene to form a mixture of isocyanates, the isomer ratio being determined by the isomeric composition of the diamine. Two different reaction mechanisms for this transformation are possible, namely "phosgenations first" and "step-wise phosgenations".

Distillation of the mixture gives a mixture of oligomeric polyisocyanates, known as polymeric MDI, and a mixture of MDI isomers which has a low 2,4′ isomer content. Further purification entails fractionation of the MDI isomer mixture.

== Reactivity of the isocyanate group ==
The positions of the isocyanate groups influences their reactivity. An isocyanate at the 4-position is approximately four times more reactive than the group at the 2-position due to steric hindrance. In 4,4′-MDI and 2,2′-MDI, the two isocyanate groups are equivalent to each other, but in 2,4′-MDI the two groups display highly differing reactivities.

MDI isomers and polymer

== Applications ==
The major application of 4,4′-MDI is the production of rigid polyurethane. These rigid polyurethane foams are good thermal insulators and used in nearly all freezers and refrigerators worldwide, as well as buildings. Typical polyols used are polyethylene adipate (a polyester) and poly(tetramethylene ether) glycol (a polyether).

4,4′-MDI is also used as an industrial strength adhesive, which is available to end consumers as various high-strength bottled glue preparations.

== Safety ==
MDI, like the other isocyanates, is an allergen and sensitizer. Persons developing sensitivity to isocyanates may have dangerous systemic reactions to extremely small exposures, including respiratory failure. Handling MDI requires strict engineering controls and personal protective equipment. It is a potentially violently reactive material towards water and other nucleophiles.
