= Isocyanate =

Chemical group (–N=C=O)

The isocyanate functional group

In organic chemistry, isocyanate is the functional group with the formula R−N=C=O. Organic compounds that contain an isocyanate group are referred to as isocyanates. An organic compound with two isocyanate groups is known as a diisocyanate. Diisocyanates are manufactured for the production of polyurethanes, a class of polymers.

== Structure and bonding ==
In terms of bonding, isocyanates are closely related to carbon dioxide (CO_{2}) and carbodiimides (C(NR)_{2}). The C−N=C=O unit that defines isocyanates is planar, and the N=C=O linkage is nearly linear. In phenyl isocyanate, the C=N and C=O distances are respectively 1.195 and 1.173 Å. The C−N=C angle is 134.9° and the N=C=O angle is 173.1°.

Isocyanates are isomers of cyanate functional group-containing molecules, with the difference being the connectivity with the rest of the molecule through the oxygen atom rather than the nitrogen atom in isocyanates. Cyanates usually convert to isocyanates due to better thermodynamic stability.

== Production ==
Isocyanates are usually produced from amines by phosgenation, i.e. treating with phosgene:

RNH_{2} + COCl_{2} → RNCO + 2 HCl

These reactions proceed via the intermediacy of a carbamoyl chloride (RNHC(O)Cl). Owing to the hazardous nature of phosgene, the production of isocyanates requires special precautions. A laboratory-safe variation masks the phosgene as oxalyl chloride. Also, oxalyl chloride can form acyl isocyanates from primary amides, which phosgene typically dehydrates to nitriles instead.

Another route to isocyanates entails addition of isocyanic acid to alkenes. Complementarily, alkyl isocyanates form by displacement reactions involving alkyl halides and alkali metal cyanates.

Aryl isocyanates can be synthesized from reductive carbonylation of nitro- and nitrosoarenes; a chalcogen or palladium catalyst is necessary to avoid side-reactions of the nitrene intermediate.

Three rearrangement reactions involving nitrenes give isocyanates:

- Schmidt reaction, a reaction where a carboxylic acid is treated with ammonia and hydrazoic acid yielding an isocyanate.
- Curtius rearrangement degradation of an acyl azide to an isocyanate and nitrogen gas.
- Lossen rearrangement, the conversion of a hydroxamic acid to an isocyanate via the formation of an O-acyl, sulfonyl, or phosphoryl intermediate.

An isocyanate is also the immediate product of the Hofmann rearrangement, but typically hydrolyzes under reaction conditions.

== Reactivity ==
=== With nucleophiles ===
Isocyanates are electrophiles, and as such they are reactive toward a variety of nucleophiles including alcohols, amines, and even water. Upon treatment with an alcohol, an isocyanate forms a urethane linkage:

ROH + R'NCO → ROC(O)N(H)R' R and R' are alkyl or aryl groups.

If a diisocyanate is treated with a compound containing two or more hydroxyl groups, such as a diol or a polyol, polymer chains are formed, which are known as polyurethanes.

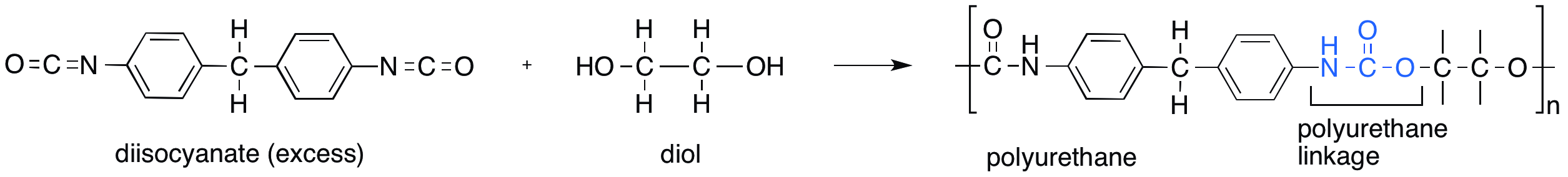
Synthesis of polyurethane from a diisocyanate and a diol

Isocyanates react with water to form carbon dioxide:

RNCO + H_{2}O → RNH_{2} + CO_{2}

This reaction is exploited in tandem with the production of polyurethane to give polyurethane foams. The carbon dioxide functions as a blowing agent.

Isocyanates also react with amines to give ureas:

R_{2}NH + R'NCO → R_{2}NC(O)N(H)R'

The addition of an isocyanate to a urea gives a biuret:

R_{2}NC(O)N(H)R' + R''NCO → R_{2}NC(O)NR'C(O)NHR''

Reaction between a di-isocyanate and a compound containing two or more amine groups produces long polymer chains known as polyureas.

Carbodiimides are produced by the decarboxylation of alkyl and aryl isocyanate using phosphine oxides as a catalyst:

C_{6}H_{11}NCO → (C_{6}H_{11}N)_{2}C + CO_{2}

Ketenimines can be prepared by reactions of isocyanates with Wittig reagents:

Ph_{3}P=CR_{2} + R'N=C=O → R_{2}C=C=NR' + Ph_{3}PO (Ph = phenyl)

When the substituents on the terminal carbon differ, the ketenimines are intrinsically chiral owing to the non-linearity of the C=N-R group.

=== Cyclization ===
Isocyanates also can react with themselves. Aliphatic diisocyanates can trimerise to from substituted isocyanuric acid groups. This can be seen in the formation of polyisocyanurate resins (PIR) which are commonly used as rigid thermal insulation. Isocyanates participate in Diels–Alder reactions, functioning as dienophiles.

=== Rearrangement reactions ===
Isocyanates are common intermediates in the synthesis of primary amines via hydrolysis:

- Hofmann rearrangement, a reaction in which a primary amide is treated with a strong oxidizer such as sodium hypobromite or lead tetraacetate to form an isocyanate intermediate.

== Commercial isocyanates ==
Methylene diphenyl 4,4'-diisocyanate (MDI); numbering of the ring atoms shown with blue numbers

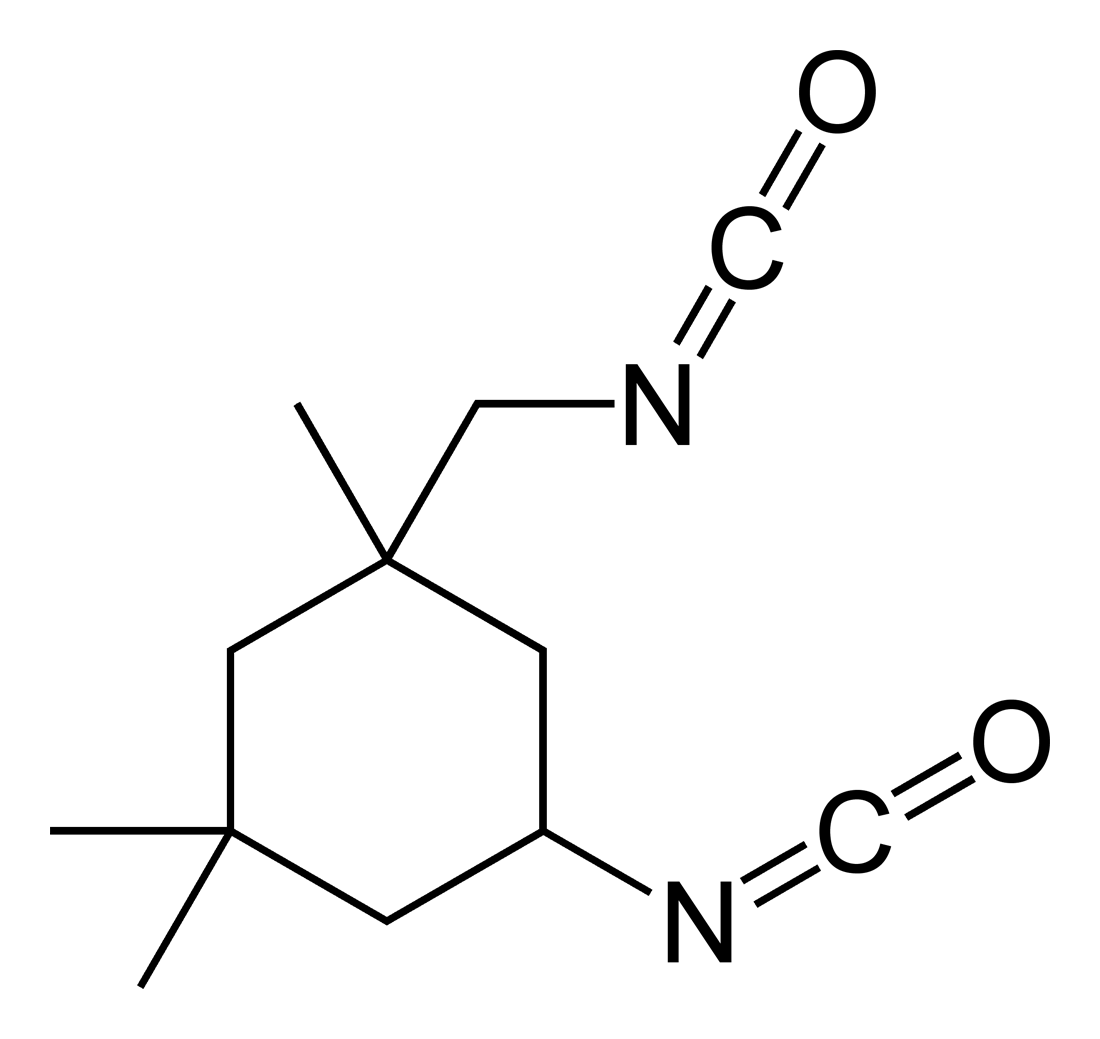
Isophorone diisocyanate

The simplest isocyanate, methyl isocyanate (MIC), is used in the manufacture of pesticides. Diisocyanates are produced on a particularly large scale because they are precursors to polyurethanes. The global market for diisocyanates in the year 2000 was 4.4 million tonnes, of which 61.3% was methylene diphenyl diisocyanate (MDI), 34.1% was toluene diisocyanate (TDI), 3.4% was the total for hexamethylene diisocyanate (HDI) and isophorone diisocyanate (IPDI), and 1.2% was the total for various others.

MDI is used in the manufacture of rigid foams and surface coating. Polyurethane foam boards are used in construction for insulation. TDI is used in applications where flexible foams are used, such as furniture and bedding. Both MDI and TDI are used in the making of adhesives and sealants due to weather-resistant properties. Isocyanates, both MDI and TDI are widely used in as spraying applications of insulation due to the speed and flexibility of applications. Foams can be sprayed into structures and harden in place or retain some flexibility as required by the application. HDI is commonly utilized in high-performance surface-coating applications, including automotive paints.

== Health and safety ==
The risks of isocyanates was brought to the world's attention with the 1984 Bhopal disaster, which caused the death of nearly 4000 people from the accidental release of methyl isocyanate. In 2008, the same chemical was involved in an explosion at a pesticide manufacturing plant in West Virginia.

LD50s for isocyanates are typically several hundred milligrams per kilogram. Despite this low acute toxicity, an extremely low short-term exposure limit (STEL) of 0.07 mg/m^{3} is the legal limit for all isocyanates (except methyl isocyanate: 0.02 mg/m^{3}) in the United Kingdom. These limits are set to protect workers from chronic health effects such as occupational asthma, contact dermatitis, or irritation of the respiratory tract.

Since they are used in spraying applications, the properties of their aerosols have attracted attention. In the U.S., OSHA conducted a National Emphasis Program on isocyanates starting in 2013 to make employers and workers more aware of the health risks. Polyurethanes have variable curing times, and the presence of free isocyanates in foams vary accordingly.

Both the US National Toxicology Program (NTP) and International Agency for Research on Cancer (IARC) have evaluated TDI as a potential human carcinogen and Group 2B "possibly carcinogenic to humans". MDI appears to be relatively safer and is unlikely a human carcinogen. The IARC evaluates MDI as Group 3 "not classifiable as to its carcinogenicity in humans".

All major producers of MDI and TDI are members of the International Isocyanate Institute, which promotes the safe handling of MDI and TDI.

=== Hazards ===
==== Toxicity ====
Isocyanates can present respiratory hazards as particulates, vapors or aerosols. Autobody shop workers are a very commonly examined population for isocyanate exposure as they are repeatedly exposed when spray painting automobiles and can be exposed when installing truck bed liners. Hypersensitivity pneumonitis has slower onset and features chronic inflammation that can be seen on imaging of the lungs. Occupational asthma is a worrisome outcome of respiratory sensitization to isocyanates as it can be acutely fatal. Diagnosis of occupational asthma is generally performed using pulmonary function testing (PFT) and performed by pulmonology or occupational medicine physicians. Occupational asthma is much like asthma in that it causes episodic shortness of breath and wheezing. Both the dose and duration of exposure to isocyanates can lead to respiratory sensitization. Dermal exposures to isocyanates can sensitize an exposed person to respiratory disease.

Dermal exposures can occur via mixing, spraying coatings or applying and spreading coatings manually. Dermal exposures to isocyanates is known to lead to respiratory sensitization. Even when the right personal protective equipment (PPE) is used, exposures can occur to body areas not completely covered. Isocyanates can also permeate improper PPE, necessitating frequent changes of both disposable gloves and suits if they become over exposed.

==== Flammability ====
Methyl isocyanate (MIC) is highly flammable. MDI and TDI are much less flammable. Flammability of materials is a consideration in furniture design. The specific flammability hazard is noted on the safety data sheet (SDS) for specific isocyanates.

=== Hazard minimization ===
Human working with isocyanate typically wear personal protective equipment (PPE). For some autobody paint and clear-coat spraying applications, a full-face mask is required.

The US Occupational Safety and Health Administration (OSHA) requires frequent training to ensure isocyanate hazards are appropriately minimized. Moreover, OSHA requires standardized isocyanate concentration measurements to avoid violating occupational exposure limits. In the case of MDI, OSHA expects sampling with glass-fiber filters at standard air flow rates, and then liquid chromatography.

Combined industrial hygiene and medical surveillance can significantly reduce occupational asthma incidence. Biological tests exist to identify isocyanate exposure; the US Navy uses regular pulmonary function testing and screening questionnaires.

Emergency management is a complex process of preparation and should be considered in a setting where a release of bulk chemicals may threaten the well-being of the public. In the Bhopal disaster, an uncontrolled MIC release killed thousands, affected hundreds of thousands more, and spurred the development of modern disaster preparation.

==== Occupational exposure limits ====
Exposure limits can be expressed as ceiling limits, a maximal value, short-term exposure limits (STEL), a 15-minute exposure limit or an 8-hour time-weighted average limit (TWA). Below is a sampling, not exhaustive, as less common isocyanates also have specific limits within the United States, and in some regions there are limits on total isocyanate, which recognizes some of the uncertainty regarding the safety of mixtures of chemicals as compared to pure chemical exposures. For example, while there is no OEL for HDI, NIOSH has a REL of 5 ppb for an 8-hour TWA and a ceiling limit of 20 ppb, consistent with the recommendations for MDI.

Methylene bisphenyl isocyanate (MDI)
Organization (region)	Standard	Value
OSHA (USA)	Ceiling limit	20 ppb
NIOSH (USA)	Recommended exposure limit (REL) – ceiling limit	20 ppb
NIOSH (USA)	Recommended exposure limit (REL) – TWA	5 ppb
ACGIH (USA)	Threshold limit value (TLV)	5 ppb
Safe Work (Australia)	All isocyanates – TWA	0.02 mg/m^{3} (approximately 2.5 ppb for comparison)
Safe Work (Australia)	All isocyanates – STEL	0.07 mg/m^{3} (approximately 10 ppb for comparison)
Heath & Safety Executive (UK)	All isocyanates – TWA	0.02 mg/m3
Heath & Safety Executive (UK)	All isocyanates – STEL	0.07 mg/m^{3}

Toluene-2,4-diisocyanate (TDI)
Organization (region)	Standard	Value
OSHA (USA)	Ceiling limit	20 ppb
NIOSH (USA)	Recommended exposure limit (REL)	[none]
ACGIH (USA)	Threshold limit value (TLV)	5 ppb
ACGIH (USA)	Ceiling limit	20 ppb

=== Regulation ===
==== United States ====
The Occupational Safety and Health Administration (OSHA) is the regulatory body covering worker safety. OSHA puts forth permissible exposure limit (PEL) 20 ppb for MDI and detailed technical guidance on exposure assessment.

The National Institutes of Health (NIOSH) is the agency responsible for providing the research and recommendations regarding workplace safety, while OSHA is more of an enforcement body. NIOSH is responsible for producing the science that can result in recommended exposure limits (REL), which can be lower than the PEL. OSHA is tasked with enforcement and defending the enforceable limits (PELs). In 1992, when OSHA reduced the PEL for TDI to the NIOSH REL, the PEL reduction was challenged in court, and the reduction was reversed.

The Environmental Protection Agency (EPA) is also involved in the regulation of isocyanates with regard to the environment and also non-worker persons that might be exposed.

The American Conference of Governmental Industrial Hygienists (ACGIH) is a non-government organization that publishes guidance known as threshold limit values (TLV) for chemicals based research as constant work exposure level without ill-effect. The TLV is not an OSHA-enforceable value, unless the PEL is the same.

==== European Union ====
The European Chemicals Agency (ECHA) provides regulatory oversight of chemicals used within the European Union. ECHA has been implementing policy aimed at limiting worker exposure through elimination by lower allowable concentrations in products and mandatory worker training, an administrative control. Within the European Union, many nations set their own occupational exposure limits for isocyanates.

==== International groups ====
The United Nations, through the World Health Organization (WHO) together with the International Labour Organization (ILO) and United Nations Environment Programme (UNEP), collaborate on the International Programme on Chemical Safety (IPCS) to publish summary documents on chemicals. The IPCS published one such document in 2000 summarizing the status of scientific knowledge on MDI.

The IARC evaluates the hazard data on chemicals and assigns a rating on the risk of carcinogenesis. In the case of TDI, the final evaluation is possibly carcinogenic to humans (Group 2B). For MDI, the final evaluation is not classifiable as to its carcinogenicity to humans (Group 3).

The International Isocyanate Institute is an international industry consortium that seeks promote the safe utilization of isocyanates by promulgating best practices.

== See also ==
- Isothiocyanate – Chemical group (–N=C=S)
- Polymethylene polyphenylene isocyanate – Polyurea-based polymer derived from isocyanate monomers
