= Toluene diisocyanate =

Toluene-2,4-diisocyanate
- Toluene diisocyanate

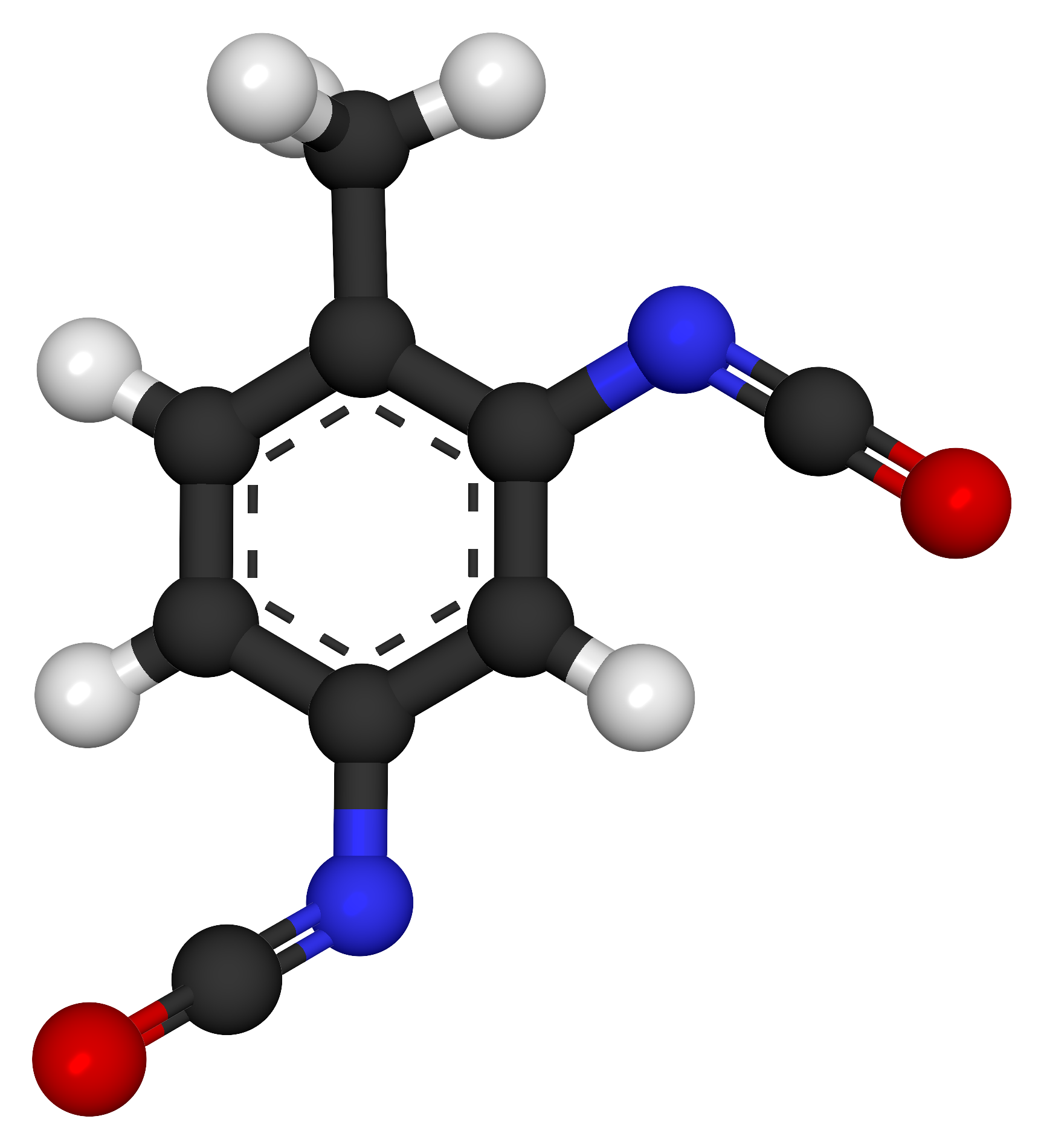
- Ball and stick model of toluene diisocyanate

Names
- Preferred IUPAC name 2,4-Diisocyanato-1-methylbenzene
- Other names Toluene diisocyanate Toluene-2,4-diisocyanate; Methyl phenylene diisocyanate Benzylene 2,4-diisocyanate 2,4-Di(nitrogencarbonyl)toluene

Identifiers
CAS Number	2,4: 584-84-9; 2,6: 91-08-7
3D model (JSmol)	2,4: Interactive image; 2,6: Interactive image
Beilstein Reference	744602
ChEBI	2,4: CHEBI:53556; 2,6: CHEBI:53557
ChEMBL	2,4: ChEMBL1086446; 2,6: ChEMBL1443390
ChemSpider	2,4: 13835351; 2,6: 6773
ECHA InfoCard	100.008.678
EC Number	2,4: 209-544-5; 2,6: 202-039-0
PubChem CID	2,4: 11443; 2,6: 7040
RTECS number	2,4: CZ6300000; 2,6: CZ6310000
UNII	2,4: 17X7AFZ1GH; 2,6: 78243HXH5O
UN number	2078
CompTox Dashboard (EPA)	2,4: DTXSID7026156; 2,6: DTXSID2026157
- InChI: InChI=1S/C9H6N2O2/c1-7-2-3-8(10-5-12)4-9(7)11-6-13/h2-4H,1H3 Key: DVKJHBMWWAPEIU-UHFFFAOYSA-N; 2,4: InChI=1/C9H6N2O2/c1-7-2-3-8(10-5-12)4-9(7)11-6-13/h2-4H,1H3 Key: DVKJHBMWWAPEIU-UHFFFAOYAL; 2,6: InChI=1S/C9H6N2O2/c1-7-8(10-5-12)3-2-4-9(7)11-6-13/h2-4H,1H3 Key: RUELTTOHQODFPA-UHFFFAOYSA-N
- SMILES: 2,4: Cc1ccc(cc1\N=C=O)\N=C=O; 2,6: CC1=C(C=CC=C1N=C=O)N=C=O

Properties
Chemical formula	C_{9}H_{6}N_{2}O_{2}
Molar mass	174.2 g/mol
Appearance	Colorless liquid
Odor	sharp, pungent
Density	1.214 g/cm^{3}, liquid
Melting point	21.8 °C (71.2 °F; 294.9 K)
Boiling point	251 °C (484 °F; 524 K)
Solubility in water	Reacts
Vapor pressure	0.01 mmHg (25°C)

Hazards
- GHS labelling
Pictograms	(GHS05: Corrosive) (GHS06: Toxic) (GHS07: Exclamation mark) (GHS08: Health hazard)
Signal word	Danger
Hazard statements	H315, H317, H318, H319, H330, H334, H335, H351, H412
Precautionary statements	P201, P202, P260, P264, P271, P272, P273, P280, P281, P284, P285, P302+P352, P304+P340, P304+P341, P305+P351+P338, P308+P313, P310, P312, P320, P321, P332+P313, P333+P313, P337+P313, P342+P311, P362, P363, P403+P233, P405, P501
NFPA 704 (fire diamond)	3 1 1
Flash point	127 °C (261 °F; 400 K)
Explosive limits	0.9–9.5%
- Lethal dose or concentration (LD, LC)
LC_{50} (median concentration)	14 ppm (rat, 4 hr); 13.9 ppm (guinea pig, 4 hr); 9.7 ppm (mouse, 4 hr); 11 ppm (rabbit, 4 hr)
- NIOSH (US health exposure limits)
PEL (Permissible)	C 0.02 ppm (0.14 mg/m^{3})
REL (Recommended)	Ca
IDLH (Immediate danger)	Ca [2.5 ppm]

Related compounds
Related isocyanates	Methylene diphenyl diisocyanate Naphthalene diisocyanate, 1,3-Diisocyanatobenzene
Related compounds	Polyurethane
- Except where otherwise noted, data are given for materials in their standard state (at 25 °C [77 °F], 100 kPa). verify (what is ?) Infobox references

Toluene diisocyanate (TDI) is an organic compound with the formula CH_{3}C_{6}H_{3}(NCO)_{2}. Two of the six possible isomers are commercially important: 2,4-TDI (CAS: 584-84-9) and 2,6-TDI (CAS: 91-08-7). 2,4-TDI is produced in the pure state, but TDI is often marketed as 80/20 and 65/35 mixtures of the 2,4 and 2,6 isomers respectively. It is produced on a large scale, accounting for 34.1% of the global isocyanate market in 2000, second only to MDI. Approximately 1.4 billion kilograms were produced in 2000. All isomers of TDI are colorless, although commercial samples can appear yellow.

== Synthesis ==
2,4-TDI is prepared in three steps from toluene via dinitrotoluene and 2,4-diaminotoluene (TDA). Finally, the TDA is subjected to phosgenation, i.e., treatment with phosgene to form TDI. This final step produces HCl as a byproduct and is a major source of industrial hydrochloric acid.

Distillation of the raw TDI mixture produces an 80:20 mixture of 2,4-TDI and 2,6-TDI, known as TDI (80/20). Differentiation or separation of the TDI (80/20) can be used to produce pure 2,4-TDI and a 65:35 mixture of 2,4-TDI and 2,6-TDI, known as TDI (65/35).

== Description and description of reactivity ==
The isocyanate functional groups in TDI react with hydroxyl groups to form carbamate (urethane) links. The two isocyanate groups in Toluene diisocyanate react at different rates: The 4-position is approximately four times more reactive than the 2-position. 2,6-TDI is a symmetrical molecule and thus has two isocyanate groups of similar reactivity, similar to the 2-position on 2,4-TDI. However, since both isocyanate groups are attached to the same aromatic ring, reaction of one isocyanate group will cause a change in the reactivity of the second isocyanate group.

== Applications ==
Toluene diisocyanate is used in the production of rigid polyurethane foams with a high temperature stability.

It is also sometimes used in rocket propellants.

== Hazards ==
TDI is classified as "very toxic" by the European Community. This is due to the high pulmonary risk of prolonged exposure at low doses.

In the United States, the Occupational Safety and Health Administration has set a permissible exposure limit with a ceiling at 0.02 ppm (0.14 mg/m^{3}), while the National Institute for Occupational Safety and Health has not established a recommended exposure limit, due to the classification of toluene diisocyanate as a possible occupational carcinogen. This chemical was one of many that were stored by the company whose chemical warehouse stationed in Tianjin, China was the site of massive explosions on August 12, 2015.

Information is available on handling, personal protective equipment, exposure monitoring, transport, storage, sampling and analysis of TDI, dealing with accidents, and health and environmental themes. All major producers of TDI are members of the International Isocyanate Institute, whose aim is the promotion of the safe handling of TDI in the workplace, community, and environment.

High-level exposure can result in reactive airways dysfunction syndrome.

== See also ==
- Hexamethylene diisocyanate
- Isophorone diisocyanate
- Methylene diphenyl diisocyanate
