= Blocked isocyanates =

Class of chemical compounds

Blocked isocyanates are organic compounds that have their isocyanate functionality chemically blocked—meaning its reactivity is controlled. They are the product of the reaction of an isocyanate moiety (nearly always a di-isocyanate) and a suitable blocking agent. It may also be a polyurethane prepolymer that is NCO terminated but this functionality has also been chemically reacted with a blocking agent. They are usually used in polyurethane applications but not always. They are extensively used in industrial applications such as coatings, sealants and adhesives.

== Overview ==
A blocked isocyanate can be added to materials that would normally react with the isocyanate such as polyols. They do not react at normal ambient room temperature. A formulation containing a blocked isocyanate is a single component material (and thus usually considered more convenient) but reacts like a two-component product but will not react until heated to the temperature required for activation which varies depending on the blocking agent. The shelf lives when stored at ambient temperature have been reported as good. On heating up to the activation temperature, cure can be as short as 20 minutes depending on the blocking agent and other formulation parameters.

Blocked isocyanates are particularly useful in products with a dual cure mechanisms. As an example, Ultraviolet light initiates the polymerization of an acrylate based polymer that contains hydroxy groups on the polymer backbone. The system would also contain an isocyanate blocked with a malonate. This is now a one-component system. When heat is applied, the polymerization is initiated. Higher temperatures then unblock the isocyanate, allowing the cure and crosslinking of the urethane.

== Blocking agents ==
A number of blocking agents may be employed but a common one is Methylethyl ketone oxime (MEKO). Caprolactam is also used.

When blocked, there is no isocyanate (NCO) functionality, so it is much easier to disperse the species in water if the desire is to produce waterborne resins. One of the key reasons different blocking agents are used apart from chemical properties is that they unblock at different temperatures. MEKO has a fairly low unblocking temperature and is thus in fairly common usage. A mixture of blocking agents maybe used to optimize properties.

== Unblocking temperatures ==
Different blocking agents for isocyanates have different unblocking temperatures.

- Sodium bisulfite 85 °C
- Diethyl malonate = 110 °C
- 3,5-Dimethylpyrazole = 115 °C
- MEKO = 135 °C
- Phenol = 150 °C
- Caprolactam = 170 °C

== Catalysts ==
Catalysts also have a role in the unblocking of blocked isocyanates. As with regular isocyanates organometallic compounds and tertiary amines may lower the unblocking temperature. Tin compounds, such as dibutyltin dilaurate, dibutyltin diacetate and other metal compounds are effective deblocking catalysts.

== Uses ==
Apart from uses in coatings and adhesives they are also used to enhance the performance of polyester tire cord. Other uses include Powder coatings, Coil Coatings, Cationic Electrocoating and primers. Blocked isocyanates have also been used in tertiary oilfield recovery techniques. A blocked isocyanate is pumped into the rock/geological formation and then an organic compound with an active hydrogen is also pumped down. The result is a polymeric gel assisting with oil recovery. The use of sodium bisulfite as a blocking agent has also allowed them to be used in waterborne resins such as PUDs. Similarly, vanillin maybe used as an isocyanate blocker and is actively being researched. It is then used in single component waterborne coatings.

== See also ==
- Isocyanate
- Polyurethane
- Polyurethane dispersion
