= Tellurogallate =

Chemical compounds which contain anionic units of tellurium connected to gallium

Tellurogallates are chemical compounds which contain anionic units of tellurium connected to gallium. They can be considered as gallates where tellurium substitutes for oxygen. Similar compounds include the thiogallates, selenogallates, telluroaluminates, telluroindates and thiostannates. They are in the category of chalcogenotrielates or more broadly tellurometallates or chalcogenometallates.

== Formation ==
Tellurogallates may be produced by heating a metal with gallium and tellurium in a sealed tube.

== Properties ==
Some tellurogallates are semiconductors

== Use ==
Tellurogallates are primarily of research interest. They are investigated for their infrared, thermoelectric and semiconductor characteristics.

== List ==
name	chem	mw	crystal system	space group	unit cell Å	volume	density	comment	CAS no	references
lithium tellurogallate	LiGaTe_{2}	321.86	tetragonal	I4̅2d	a=6.338 c=11.704 Z=16	470.1	2.937	orange to black; band gap 2.41 eV		
sodium trigallium pentatelluride	NaGa_{3}Te_{5}		trigonal	R32	a=14.58 c=17.761 Z=12	3269.5	5.272	black		
	[(C_{6}H_{5})_{4}P]GaTe_{2}(en)_{2} en = ethane-1,2-diamine		monoclinic	C2/c	a=20.680 b=5.3877 c=27.192 β=19.13°	3029.6	1.720	orange		
	KGaTe_{2}		monoclinic	C2/c	a=11.768, b=11.775, c=16.503, β=100.36°, Z=16					
	KGaTe_{2}		triclinic	P1 or P1̅	a=8.34 b=8.34 c=64.4 αβγ~90°	4479.4	4.30			
hexapotassium di-μ-telluridobis (ditelluridogallate)	K_{6}Ga_{2}Te_{6}		monoclinic	P12_{1}/c1	a = 8.616, b = 13.685, c = 11.290, β = 127.61°, Ζ = 2	1054.6				
	K[K([18]crown-6)]_{2}[GaTe_{3}] · 2CH_{3}CN		monoclinic	C2/m	a=24.469 b=14.073 c=12.875 β=94.47 Z=4	4369	1.784	yellow (@113K)		
	CaGa_{6}Te_{10}		monoclinic	C2	a=14.40 b=14.40 c=10.21 β=90.0 Z=4	2117.1				
	Cr_{3}(GaTe_{3})_{2}				amorphous					
	MnGa_{2}Te_{4}		monoclinic	C2/c	a=11.999, b=11.999, c=24.922, β=104.01°, Z=16					
	MnGa_{2}Te_{4}		orthorhombic	Pnma	a = 27.448, b = 4.192, c = 6.993 Z=4	804.6	5.82			
	Fe_{3}(GaTe_{3})_{2}				amorphous					
	Co_{3}(GaTe_{3})_{2}				amorphous					
	Ni_{3−x}GaTe_{2}			P6_{3}/mmc	a=3.9393 c=15.7933 Z=2					
	Ni_{2}FeGaTe			P6_{3}/mmc	a=3.962 c=15.868 Z=2	215.7				
	CuGaTe_{2}			I4̅2d	a = 6.02348, c = 11.93979	433.2				
	ZnGa_{2}Te_{4}			I4̅	a=5.930, c=11.859 Z=2		5.7			
	ZnGa_{2}Te_{4}		tetragonal	I4̅2m	a=6.922 c=11.809					
	ZnGa_{2}Te_{4}			F4̅3m	a=5.843 Z=1/2					
	AgGaTe_{2}			I4̅2d	a=6.320 c=11.986 Z=2		6.052	melt 725.7 °C; heat of fusion= 104.8 J/g^{−1}		
	AgGa_{5}Te_{8}		tetragonal	I4_{1}/a	a=8.415 c=47.877					
	Ag_{2}Ga_{6}Te_{10}									
	Ag_{9}GaTe_{6}		hexagonal					melt 710 °C Low thermal conductivity		
	CdGa_{2}Te_{4}		tetragonal		a=5.742 c=10.730					
	InGaTe_{2}		tetragonal	I4/mcm	a = 8.412, c = 6.875; Z = 4;					
	In_{2}Ga_{6}Te_{10}		trigonal	R32	a=10.34 alpha=89.7 Z=12		5.78			
	SnGa_{6}Te_{10}		trigonal	P3121/6	a=14.408 c=17.678 Z=6	3178	5.684	black		
	Sn_{x}Ga_{1-x}Te x=1/2		cubic		a=6.315	251.84				
	β-BaGa_{2}Te_{4}		orthorhombic	Imma	a = 23.813, b = 11.967, c = 6.7215					
	Ba_{5}Ga_{2}Ge_{3}Te_{12}		monoclinic	P2_{1}/c	a = 13.6540, b = 9.6705, and c = 23.1134 β =91.829					
	LaGa^{I}Te_{2}		orthorhombic	Pmc2_{1}						
	CeGa^{I}Te_{2}		orthorhombic	Pmc2_{1}						
	PrGa^{I}Te_{2}		orthorhombic	Pmc2_{1}						
	NdGa^{I}Te_{2}		orthorhombic	Pmc2_{1}						
	Eu_{0.81}Ga_{2}Te_{4}		tetragonal	I4/mcm	a = 8.2880, c = 6.744, Z = 2	463.24				
	HgGa_{2}Te_{4}		cubic	F4̅3m	a=6.002 Z=1	216.22				
	HgGa_{2}Te_{4}		tetragonal	I4̅2m	a=6.025 c=12.037 Z=2	436.95		black		
	TlGaTe_{2}		tetragonal	I4/mmm D^{18}_{4h}	a=8.429 c=6.865			band gap 0.84 eV		
	Tl_{2}InGaTe_{4}		tetragonal	I4mcm						
	PbGa_{6}Te_{10}		trigonal	P3_{2}21/6	a=14.465 c=17.718 Z=6	3210	5.898	black		
