= Selenogallate =

Class of chemical compounds

Selenogallates (or selenidogallates) are chemical compounds which contain anionic units of selenium connected to gallium. They can be considered as gallates where selenium substitutes for oxygen. Similar compounds include the thiogallates and selenostannates. They are in the category of chalcogenotrielates or more broadly chalcogenometallates.

== Formation ==
Selenogallates may be produced by heating a metal azide with gallium monoselenide and selenium in a sealed tube.

Selenogallates containing Se_{2} units are formed by heating with selenium. Conversely, by heating, extra selenium vapour can be lost forming a compound with less selenium.

== Properties ==
Most selenogallates are semiconductors. Their resistance drops on exposure to light. Also selenogallates are often coloured, most often red.

Selenogallate structures can include rings such as the four-membered ring: [_{G̅a̅S̅e̅G̅a̅S̅e̅}] or the five-membered [_{G̅a̅S̅e̅S̅e̅G̅a̅S̅e̅}]. These can be linked into chains.

== Use ==
Selenogallates are primarily of research interest. They are being researched for photovoltaic cells where efficiencies over 20% are possible, and for photoconductors, and non-linear optical devices.

== List ==
name	chem	mw	crystal system	space group	unit cell Å	volume	density	comment	CAS no	references
	LiGaSe_{2}	234.581	orthorhombic	Pna2_{1}	a=6.8478 b=8.2575 c=6.5521 Z=4	370.5	4.206	band gap 3.39; SHG		
	[H_{2}dap]_{4}Ga_{4}Se_{10} dap = 1,2-diaminopropane		monoclinic	C2/c	a 10.821 b 10.820 c 21.386, β 97.265°					
	[(dienH_{2})(dienH)_{3}]Ga_{5}Se_{10} dien = diethylenetriamine		monoclinic	P2_{1}/c	a 6.3116 b 13.748 c 47.890 β 90.640°			chain		
	[(tetaH_{2})_{3}(teta)]Ga_{6}Se_{12} teta = triethylenetetramine		monoclinic	Cc	a 20.566 b 25.896 c 12.785 β 125.568°			chain		
	[bappH2][Ga_{2}Se_{4}] bapp =1,4-Bis-(3-aminopropyl)piperazine	657.63	triclinic	P1̅	a=6.3517 b=7.8498 c=10.7818 α=71.457° β=84.925° γ=72.084° Z=1	484.93	2.30	yellow;		
	[1,3-pdaH_{2}][Ga_{2}Se_{2}(Se_{2})(Se_{3})] 1,3-pda = 1,3-diaminopropane		monoclinic	P2_{1}	a 7.5724 b 12.3856 c 8.0889 β 94.120°			band gap 2.08 eV; GaSeSeSeGaSe & GaSeSeGaSe rings; red		
	[1,4-bdaH_{2}][Ga_{2}Se_{3}(Se_{2})] 1,4-bda = 1,4-diaminobutane		monoclinic	C2/c	a 11.7660 b 11.7743 c 10.9763 β 110.170°			band gap 2.32 eV; orange		
	[Me_{2}NH_{2}]_{2}[Ga_{2}Se_{2}(Se_{2})_{2}]		monoclinic	P2_{1}/c	a 14.13 b 8.456 c 14.07 β 100.32°			band gap 2.07 eV; red		
	α-[AEPH]_{2}[Ga_{2}Se_{2}(Se_{2})_{2}] AEP = N-(2-aminoethyl)piperazine		monoclinic	Pn	a 6.981 b 15.436 c 11.831 β 91.462°			band gap 1.93 eV; red		
	β-[AEPH]_{2}[Ga_{2}Se_{2}(Se_{2})_{2}]		monoclinic	P2_{1}/c	a 10.623 b 16.495 c 7.163 β 94.93°			band gap 2.10 eV; red		
	[Ga(en)_{3}][Ga_{3}Se_{7}(en)] · H_{2}O	1090.02	orthorhombic	Pna2_{1}	a=14.279 b=9.616 c=19.676 Z=4	2701.6	2.680	bicyclic Ga_{3}Se_{7}		
	NaGaS_{2}		monoclinic	C2/c	a 10.226 b 10.227 c 13.506 β 100.926°	1389.9				
	NaGaS_{2}•H_{2}O		monoclinic	C2/c	a=9.5160 b=113986 c=17.8761 β=101.590	1899				
	NaGa_{3}Se_{5}	626.95	orthorhombic	P2_{1}2_{1}2_{1}	a=9.764 b=13.624 c=27.000 Z=16	3591.6	4.638			
	KGaSe_{2}	266.74	monoclinic	C2/c	a = 10.878, b = 10.872, c = 15.380, β = 100.18° Z=16	1790.3	3.959	air stable; light yellow; mp=965 °C; [Ga_{4}Se_{10}]^{8−} units connected into sheets; band gap 2.60 eV		
	Cr_{2.37}Ga_{3}Se_{8}		monoclinic	C2/m				magnetic semiconductor; band gap 0.26 eV		
	MnGa_{2}Se_{4}							band gap 2.7 eV		
	[Mn(en)_{3}][Ga_{2}Se_{5}] en = Ethylenediamine	771.51	orthorhombic	Pbcn	a=9.772 b=15.297 c=13.749 Z=4	2055.2	2.50	red; {[Ga_{2}Se_{5}]^{2-}}∞ chains Ga_{2}Se_{2} and Ga_{2}Se_{3} rings		
	[Mn(dap)_{3}]_{0.5}GaSe_{2}		orthorhombic	Cmcm	a 9.645 b 16.754 c 12.891					
	[Mn(atep)]Ga_{2}S_{4} atep = 4-(2-aminoethyl)triethylenetetramine		monoclinic	P2_{1}/n	a 9.909 b 11.947 c 14.831, β 102.268°					
	[Co(en)_{3}]Ga_{2}Se		orthorhombic	Cmcm	a 9.692 b 15.631 c 12.698			band gap 3.27 eV		
	{[Ni(tepa)]_{2}SO_{4}}[Ni(tepa)(Ga_{4}S_{6}(SH)_{4})] tepa = tetraethylenepentamine		monoclinic	C2/c	a 38.829 b 12.290 c 22.471 β 98.398°					
cupric selenogallate	CuGaSe_{2}	291.186	tetragonal		a = 5.5963 c = 11.0036 Z=4	344.617	5.612	metallic grey		
	ZnGa_{2}Se_{4}		tetragonal	I4̅2m						
	ZnGa_{2}Se_{4}		cubic	Fm3̅m				>15.5GPa		
	Na_{3}Zn_{2}Ga_{2}Se_{4}	519.90	tetragonal	I4_{1}acd	a 13.481 c 19.26 Z=16	3500	3.946	red		
	Na_{6}Zn_{3}Ga_{2}Se_{9}		monoclinic	C2/c	a 16.71 b 16.69 c 13.79 β 101.346°					
	KZn_{4}Ga_{5}Se_{12}			R3				SHG		
	LiGaGe_{2}Se_{6}	695.60	orthorhombic	Fdd2	a 12.5035 b 23.710 c 7.1177	2110.1	4.336	brown; band gap 2.64 eV; mp=710 °C		
	Li_{2}Ga_{2}GeS_{6}		orthorhombic	Fdd2	a=12.0796 b=22.73 c=6.84048					
	NaGaGe_{3}Se_{8}		monoclinic	P2_{1}/c	a 7.233 b 11.889 c 17.550 β 101.75°					
	KGaGeSe_{4}	497.25	monoclinic	P2_{1}/c	a=7.3552 b=12.4151 c=17.6213 β =97.026 Z=8	1597.02	4.136	yellow		
	RbGaSe_{2}	313.11	monoclinic	C2/c	a = 10.954, b = 10.949, c = 16.064, β = 99.841° Z=16	1898.2	4.382	colourless; mp=930 °C; _{∞}^{2}[Ga_{4}Se_{8}^{8−}] layers of supertetrahedra;		
	RbZn_{4}Ga_{5}Se_{12}			R3				SHG		
	RbGaGeSe_{4}	543.62	orthorhombic	Pnma	a=17.5750 b=7.4718 c=12.4449 Z=8	1634.23	4.419	orange		
	AgGaSe_{2}		tetragonal	I4̅2d	a = 5.9921, c = 10.883		5.71	transparent from 0.71 to 18 μm; band gap ~1.7		
	AgGa_{5}Se_{8}			P4̅2m	a=5.50 c=11.04			band gap 2.1 eV		
	Ag_{9}GaSe_{6}			P2_{1}3				band gap 0.56 eV		
	Ag_{9}GaSe_{6}		cubic	F4̅3m	a=11.126					
	Li_{x}Ag_{1–x}GaSe_{2} (x = 0.2–0.8)		tetragonal	I4̅2d				SHG		
	Na_{0.45}Ag_{0.55}Ga_{3}Se_{5}		trigonal	R32	a=13.466 c=16.495 Z=12	2590.5		SHG 1.9 × AGS		
	KAg_{3}Ga_{8}Se_{14}	2025.91	monoclinic	Cm	a 12.8805 b 11.6857 c 9.6600 β 115.998° Z=2	1306.87	5.148	orange		
	AgGaGe_{5}Se_{12}							red; transparent for 0.6–16.5 μm; band gap 2.2 eV		
	CdGa_{2}Se_{4}		tetragonal	I4̅	a=5.3167 c=10.2858 Z=2			semiconductor		
	CdGa_{2}Se_{4}		cubic	F43m	a=5.64 Z=4			>21 GPa metallic		
	CdGa_{2}Se_{4}		cubic	Fm3̅m	a=5.03 Z=4			4-7.4 GPa		
	KCd_{4}Ga_{5}Se_{12}		trigonal	R3	a 14.362 b 14.362 c 9.724					
	RbCd_{4}Ga_{5}Se_{12}		trigonal	R3	a 14.4055 b 14.4055 c 9.7688			band gap 2.19 eV; SHG=19×AgGaS_{2}		
	InGaSe_{2}		tetragonal	I4/mcm	a = 8.051, c = 6.317 Z=4					
	SnGa_{4}Se_{7}	622.08	monoclinic	Pc	a=7.269 b=6.361 c=12.408 β =106.556 Z=2	549.9	3.757	light yellow;SHG 3.8 × AgGaS_{2}		
	KGaSnSe_{4}-cP84	543.35	cubic	Pa3̅	a=13.5555 Z=12	2490.8	4.347	red		
	RbGaSnSe_{4}-cP84		cubic	Pa3̅	a=13.7200 Z=12	589.72	4.550			
	RbGaSn_{2}Se_{6}	866.33	trigonal	R3	a=10.4697 c=9.476 Z=3	899.5	4.798	deep red		
	SnGa_{2}GeSe_{6}	804.48	orthorhombic	Fdd2	a = 47.195, b = 7.521, c = 12.183, Z = 16	4324	4.943	red; SHG 1.7 × AgGaS_{2}		
	CsGaSe_{2}-mC64		monoclinic	C2/c	a = 11.043, b = 11.015, c = 16.810, β = 99.49°, Z = 16	2016.7		light grey; layers of supertetrahedra _{∞}^{2}[Ga_{4}Se_{8}^{4–}]; band gap 3.5 eV		
	CsGaSe_{2}-mC16		monoclinic	C2/c	a = 7.651, b = 12.552, c = 6.170, β = 113.62°, Z = 4	542.9		over 610 °C; chains _{∞}^{1}[GaSe_{2}^{–}]		
	CsGaSe_{3}		monoclinic	P2_{1}/c	a=7.727, b=13.014, c=6.705, β=106.39°, Z=4			red; chains; band gap 2.25 eV		
	Cs_{2}Ga_{2}Se_{5}	800.07	monoclinic	C2/c	a = 15.3911, b = 7.3577, c = 12.9219, β = 126.395°, Z = 4	1177.89	4.51	yellow; _{∞}^{1}[Ga_{2}Se_{3}(Se_{2})^{2–}] band gap 1.95 eV		
	Cs_{4}Ga_{6}Se_{11}		triclinic	P1̅	a=9.707 b=9.888 c=16.780 α=76.425° β=77.076° γ=60.876°	1356.3		_{∞}^{1}[Ga6Se_{11}]^{4–}		
	Cs_{6}Ga_{2}Se_{6}		monoclinic	P2_{1}/c	a=8.480 b=13.644 c=11.115 β =126.22 Z=2			mp=685 °C; isolated double tetrahedra [Ga_{2}Se_{6}]^{6−}		
	Cs_{8}Ga_{4}Se_{10}		triclinic	P1̅	a= 7.870 b=9.420 c=11.282 α=103.84° β=93.43° γ=80.88° Z=1		4.42	tetrameric		
	Cs_{10}Ga_{6}Se_{14}		monoclinic	C2/m	a=18.233 b=12.889 c=9.668 β=108.20 Z=2		4.39	hexameric		
	(Cs_{6}Cl)_{6}Cs_{3}[Ga_{53}Se_{96}]	16671.51	trigonal	R3̅m	a = 11.990, c = 50.012 Z=1	6226.5	4.446	yellow; band gap 2.74 eV		
	CsZn_{4}Ga_{5}Se_{12}		trigonal	R3						
	CsGaGeSe_{4}	591.06	orthorhombic	Pnma	a=17.7666 b=7.5171 c=12.6383 Z=8	1687.9	4.652	white		
	Cs_{2}Ge_{3}Ga_{6}Se_{14}	2007.41		P3̅m1	a=7.6396 c=13.5866 Z=1	686.72	4.854	black		
	CsAgGa_{2}Se_{4}		monoclinic	P2_{1}/c	a=11.225, b=7.944, c=21.303, β=103.10, Z=8	1850.3		layered		
	CsCd_{4}Ga_{5}Se_{12}		trigonal	R3	a 14.4204 b 14.4204 c 9.7803			band gap 2.21 eV; SHG=16×AgGaS_{2}		
	BaGa_{4}Se_{7}		monoclinic	Pc	a = 7.625, b = 6.511, c = 14.702, β = 121.24°			transparent between 0.47 and 18.0 μm; melts 968 °C; SHG		
	Ba_{4}Ga_{2}Se_{8}	132.48	monoclinic	P2_{1}/c	a=13.2393 b=6.4305 c=20.6432 β =104.3148 Z=4	1702.90	5.151	black air stable; band gap 1.51 eV		
	Ba_{5}Ga_{2}Se_{8}		orthorhombic	Cmca	a 23.433 b 12.461 c 12.214			band gap 2.51 eV		
	Ba_{5}Ga_{4}Se_{10}	1755.18	tetragonal	I4/mcm	a = 8.752, c = 13.971 Z = 2	1070.2	5.447	red; bicyclic ring with Ga-Ga bridge; band gap 2.20 eV		
	Ba_{3}GaSe_{4}Cl		orthorhombic	Pnma	a 12.691 b 9.870 c 8.716					
	Ba_{3}GaSe_{4}Br		orthorhombic	Pnma	a = 12.8248, b = 9.9608, c = 8.7690 Z = 4			band gap 1.7 eV		
	LiBa_{4}Ga_{5}Se_{12}	1852.42	tetragonal	P4̅2_{1}c	a 13.591 c 6.515 Z=2	1203.3	5.113	yellow; band gap 2.44 eV; SHG 1.7×AgGaS_{2}		
	NaBaGaSe_{3}		orthorhombic	Pnma	a 20.46 b 9.177 c 7.177	1347		colourless		
	(Na_{0.60}Ba_{0.70})Ga_{2}Se_{4}		tetragonal	I4cm	a 7.9549 c 6.2836	397.6	4.725	pale yellow		
	KBa_{3}Ga_{5}Se_{10}Cl_{2}		tetragonal	I4̅	a 8.6341 c 15.644	1166.2		band gap 2.04 eV; SHG=10×AgGaS_{2}		
	MnBa_{4}Ga_{4}Se_{10}Cl_{2}		tetragonal	I4̅	8.5858 c 15.7739			band gap 2.8 eV; SHG=30×AgGaS_{2}		
	FeBa_{4}Ga_{4}Se_{10}Cl_{2}		tetragonal	I4̅	a 8.578 c 15.717			band gap 1.88 eV		
	CoBa_{4}Ga_{4}Se_{10}Cl_{2}		tetragonal	I4̅	a 8.572 c 15.716			band gap 2.02 eV		
	Cu_{0.5}Ba_{4}Ga_{4.5}Se_{10}Cl_{2}		tetragonal	I4̅	a 8.559 c 15.778			band gap 2.6 eV; SHG=39×AgGaS_{2}		
	CuBa_{4}Ga_{5}Se_{12}			P42_{1}c	a = 13.598, c = 6.527, Z = 2			band gap 1.45 eV; SHG=3×AgGaS_{2}		
	ZnBa_{4}Ga_{4}Se_{10}Cl_{2}		tetragonal	I4̅	a 8.561 c 15.757			band gap 3.08 eV; SHG=59×AgGaS_{2}		
	Ba_{10}Zn_{7}Ga_{6}Se_{26}		tetragonal	I4̅2m	a 11.2907 c 21.760 Z=2	2774.0	5.151	yellow		
	Ba_{4}Ga_{4}GeSe_{12}	1848.35	tetragonal	P4̅2_{1}c	a=13.5468 c=6.4915 Z=2	1191.29	5.153	orange yellow; band gap 2.18 eV		
	BaGa_{2}GeSe_{6}			R3						
	RbBa_{3}Ga_{5}Se_{10}Cl_{2}		tetragonal	I4̅	a 8.6629 c 15.6379			band gap 2.05 eV; SHG=20×AgGaS_{2}		
	Ba_{2}GaYSe_{5}		triclinic	P1̅	a 7.2876Å b 8.6597Å c 9.3876Å, α 103.51° β 103.04° γ 107.43°					
	Ba_{4}AgGaSe_{6}	1199.44	orthorhombic	Pnma	a=9.1006 b=4.472 c=17.7572 Z=2	722.71	5.512	dark red; air stable; band gap 2.50		
	Ba_{4}AgGa_{5}Se_{12}	1953.35	tetragonal	P4̅2_{1}c	a 13.6544 c 6.5215 Z=2	1215.9	5.335	yellow		
	Ba_{7}AgGa_{5}Se_{15}		trigonal	P31c	a 10.0467 c 18.689			band gap 2.60 eV		
	CdBa_{4}Ga_{4}Se_{10}Cl_{2}		tetragonal	I4̅	a 8.611 c 15.805			band gap 3.05 eV; SHG=52×AgGaS_{2}		
	Ba_{5}CdGa_{6}Se_{12}	2401.82	orthorhombic	Ama2	a=24.2458 b=19.1582 c=6.6208 Z=4	3075.4	5.187	yellow; air stable; band gap 2.60 eV; mp=866 °C		
	BaGa_{2}SnSe_{6}	869.23	trigonal	R3	a = 10.145, c = 9.249 Z = 3	824.4	5.253	red; SHG 5.2×AgGaS_{2}		
	Ba_{4}Ga_{4}SnSe_{12}	1894.45	tetragonal	P4̅2_{1}c	a 13.607 c 6.509 Z=2	1205.2	5.221	red; band gap 2.16 eV		
	Ba_{6}Ga_{2}SnSe_{11}	1950.73	monoclinic	P2_{1}/c	a 18.715 b 7.109 c 19.165, β 103.29°	2481.5	5.221	red; bad gap 1.99 eV		
	Ba_{2}AsGaSe_{5}	814.12	orthorhombic	Pnma	a = 12.632, b = 8.973, c = 9.203, Z = 4	1043.1	5.184	black		
	CsBa_{3}Ga_{5}Se_{10}Cl_{2}		tetragonal	I4̅	a 8.734 c 15.697	1197.6		band gap 2.08 eV; SHG=100×AgGaS_{2}		
	NaLaGa_{4}Se_{8}		orthorhombic	Fddd	a 21.1979 b 21.1625 c 12.7216					
	La_{3}MnGaSe_{7}	1094.11	hexagonal	P6_{3}	a 10.5894 c 6.3458 Z=2	616.25	5.896	black		
	La_{3}FeGaSe_{7}		hexagonal	P6_{3}	a=10.5042 c=6.3496	606.74				
	La_{3}CoGaSe_{7}		hexagonal	P6_{3}	a=10.5104 c=6.3708	609.48				
	La_{3}NiGaSe_{7}		hexagonal	P6_{3}	a=10.4826 c=6.3964	608.71				
	La_{3}CuGaSe_{7}	1102.71	hexagonal	P6_{3}	a=10.626 c=6.392 Z=2	626.0	5.859			
	La_{3}ZnGaSe_{7}	1104.54	hexagonal	P6_{3}	a=10.630 c=6.374 Z=2	623.7	5.881			
	La_{3}Ag_{0.6}GaSe_{7}		hexagonal	P6_{3}	a=10.6, c=6.4 Z=2					
	La_{3}CdGaSe_{7}		hexagonal	P6_{3}	a=10.606 c=6.380 Z=2	621.5	6.153			
	Ba_{2}GaLaSe_{5}		orthorhombic	Pnma	a 12.5049 b 9.6288 c 8.7355					
	NaCeGa_{4}Se_{8}		orthorhombic	Fddd	a 21.141 b 21.138 c 12.712					
	Ce_{3}CuGaSe_{7}	1106.34	hexagonal	P6_{3}	a=10.6007 c=6.3775 Z=2	620.65	5.920			
	Ba_{2}GaCeSe_{5}		orthorhombic	Fddd	a 12.494 b 9.599 c 8.738					
	Pr_{3}CuGaSe_{7}	1108.71	hexagonal	P6_{3}	a=10.4181 c=6.3743 Z=2	599.16	6.146			
	NaNdGa_{4}Se_{8}		orthorhombic	Fddd	a 21.015 b 21.045 c 12.709					
	Nd_{3}FeGaSe_{7}		hexagonal	P6_{3}	a 10.2453 c 6.4076 Z=2	582.47				
	Nd_{3}CoGaSe_{7}		hexagonal	P6_{3}	a=10.2296 c=6.4272	582.47				
	Nd_{3}NiGaSe_{7}		hexagonal	P6_{3}	a=10.2117 c=6.4066	578.57				
	Nd_{3}CuGaSe_{7}	1118.70	hexagonal	P6_{3}	a=10.3426 c=6.3869 Z=2	591.7	6.279			
	Ba_{2}GaNdSe_{5}		triclinic	P1̅	a 7.29Å b 8.7914Å c 9.47Å, α 103.77° β 102.91° γ 107.72°					
	SmGa_{2}Se_{4}		rhombic		a=21.34, b=21.60, c=12.74					
	Ba_{2}GaSmSe_{5}		triclinic	P1̅	a 7.3017Å b 8.7635Å c 9.4554Å, α 103.672° β 102.963° γ 107.637°					
	Gd_{3}FeGaSe_{7}		hexagonal	P6_{3}	a 10.0762 c 6.4265 Z=2					
	Ba_{2}GaGdSe_{5}		triclinic	P1̅	a 7.2834Å b 8.7062Å c 9.4079Å, α 103.65° β 103.02° γ 107.52°					
	Dy_{3}FeGaSe_{7}		hexagonal	P6_{3}	a 9.9956Å c 6.398 Z=2					
	Ba_{2}GaDySe_{5}		triclinic	P1̅	a 7.2772Å b 8.6543Å c 9.3792Å, α 103.53° β 103.07° γ 107.43°					
	Ba_{2}GaErErSe_{5}		triclinic	P1̅	a 7.2721Å b 8.6258Å c 9.3621Å, α 103.41° β 103.13° γ 107.39°					
	Ba_{2}GaTbSe_{5}		triclinic	P1̅	a 7.309 b 8.719 c 9.433, α 103.548° β 103.039° γ 107.520°					
	Ba_{2}GaHoSe_{5}		triclinic	P1̅	a 7.2964 b 8.670 c 9.406, α 103.482° β 103.049° γ 107.423°					
	Ba_{2}GaTmSe_{5}		triclinic	P1̅	a 7.2884 b 8.6376 c 9.3823, α 103.429° β 103.075° γ 107.360°					
	Ba_{2}GaYbSe_{5}		triclinic	P1̅	a 7.2864 b 8.6257 c 9.3716, α 103.4154° β 103.0369° γ 107.3396°					
	Ba_{2}GaLuSe_{5}		triclinic	P1̅	a 7.2829 b 8.6120 c 9.368, α 103.362° β 103.051° γ 107.308°					
	HgGa_{2}Se_{4}									
	KHg_{4}Ga_{5}Se_{12}	2137.58	trigonal	R3	a 14.3203 b 14.3203 c 9.7057 Z=3	1723.7	6.178	band gap 1.61 eV; SHG=20×AgGaS_{2}		
	TlGaSe_{2}	432.01	monoclinic	C2/c	a=10.760 b=10.762 c=15.626 β=100.19 Z=16	1780.8	6.445	black; layers of supertetrahedra; mp 804 °C; band gap 1.87 eV		
	TlGaGeSe_{4}	662.52	orthorhombic	Pnma	a=17.4742 b=7.4105 c=11.9406 Z=8	1546.22	5.692			
	Tl_{2}Ga_{2}GeSe_{6}		tetragonal	I4/mmc	a=8.0770 c=6.2572 Z=4					
	Tl_{0.8}Ga_{0.8}Ge_{1.2}Se_{4}-mC112	622.22	monoclinic	C2/c	a=13.5831 b=7.4015 c=30.7410 β =96.066 Z=16	3073.3	5.379	red		
	TlGaSnSe_{4}-mP56	701.04	monoclinic	P2_{1}/c	a=7.501 b=12.175 c=18.203 β =97.164 Z=8	1649.4	5.646	red		
	TlGaSnSe_{4}-cP84	708.62	cubic	Pa3̅	a=13.4755 Z=12	2447.0	5.770	red		
	Tl_{2}Ga_{2}SnSe_{6}		tetragonal	I4/mmc	a=8.095 c=6.402 Z=4					
	TlGaSn_{2}Se_{6}			R3	a=10.3289 c=9.4340	871.64	5.6301	dark grey in bulk; maroon powder		
	PbGa_{2}Se_{4}	662.47	orthorhombic	Fddd	a =12.73 b=21.26 c=21.55 Z=32	5830	6.036	yellow to red; mp 780 °C; band gap 1.83 eV		
	Pb_{0.72}Mn_{2.84}Ga_{2.95}Se_{8}		hexagonal	P6̅	a 17.550 c 3.8916					
	PbGa_{2}GeSe_{6}		orthorhombic	Fdd2				mp 720 °C biaxial (−)		
	Pb_{4}Ga_{4}GeSe_{12}		tetragonal	P4̅2_{1}c	a = 13.064 c = 6.310 Z=2					
	Ba_{2}GaBiSe_{5}		orthorhombic	Pnma	a=12.691 b=9.190 c=9.245 Z=4	1078.2	5.841	yellow		
