= Ethyleneamine =

Class of chemical compounds

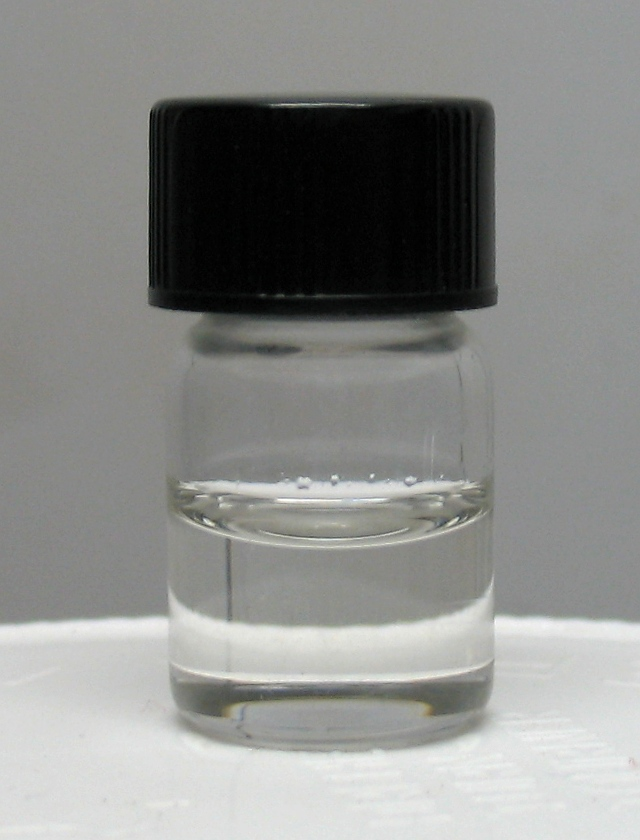
A sample of ethylenediamine, a simple ethyleneamine

Ethyleneamines are a class of amine compounds containing ethylene (-CH_{2}CH_{2}-) linkages between amine groups. These compounds are generally colorless, low-viscosity liquids with a fishy amine odor. They are primarily used as building block chemicals and in epoxy resin curing agent chemistry.

== Production ==
There are two main routes for the production of ethyleneamines, the reaction between ethylene dichloride and ammonia, and the reductive amination of monethanolamine. World capacity of ethyleneamines for the year 2001 was estimated to be 385,000 tonnes/year, with the majority comprising the ethylene dichloride route.

In the ethylene dichloride route, the initial product of this reaction is ethylenediamine. In the presence of excess ethylene dichloride, the initial ethyleneamine is extended by one ethylene unit. The terminal alkyl chloride reacts with ammonia to give the amine, and the polyamine chain can be extended further in this fashion. Addition of a polyamine to the initial reaction mixture can increase the concentration of higher-order polyamines. In all these examples, stoichiometric base is needed to convert the amine hydrochloride to free amines.

In the monoethanolamine route, monoethanolamine reacts with ammonia, catalyzed by transition metal catalysts. This process is reported to generate more cyclic compounds than the ethylene dichloride route.

As a practical matter, a mixture of products is obtained in both routes. This mixture is influenced by the composition of the feedstock, and various products are obtained by continuous distillation. By returning lower-order polyamines or polyamine derivatives into the process, more higher-order polyamines can be obtained.

== Side products ==
In addition to the ethyleneamine homologs (also spelled as homologue), side products exist. Aziridine occurs by the cyclization of chloroethylamine; piperazines are formed by cyclization of a two-ethylene unit compound to give the six-membered ring.

== Examples ==
Number of nitrogen atoms	Name	Structure	Boiling point (°C, 760 mmHg)
2	Ethylenediamine (EDA)		116.9
3	Diethylenetriamine (DETA)		206.7
3	Aminoethylpiperazine (AEP)		222.1
4	Triethylenetetraamine (linear-TETA)		276.5
4	Tris(2-aminoethyl)amine (branched-TETA)		
4	N,N'-Bis-(2-aminoethyl)piperazine) (bis-AEP)		
4	N-[(2-Aminoethyl)2-aminoethyl]piperazine) or piperazinoethylethylenediamine (PEEDA)		
5	Tetraethylenepentamine	Multiple related compounds	ca. 200
6	Pentaethylenehexamine		ca. 200
Higher	Various trade names, e.g. Huntsman E-100, Dow Heavy Polyamine	Complex mixture of higher order polyamines	Decomposes
