= 2,2′,2″-Nitrilotriacetonitrile =

Names
- Preferred IUPAC name 2,2′,2′′-Nitrilotriacetonitrile

Identifiers
CAS Number	7327-60-8
3D model (JSmol)	Interactive image
ChemSpider	73778
ECHA InfoCard	100.028.004
PubChem CID	81762
UNII	86K27312YB
CompTox Dashboard (EPA)	DTXSID3029285
- InChI: InChI=1S/C6H6N4/c7-1-4-10(5-2-8)6-3-9/h4-6H2 Key: LJAIDEYQVIJERM-UHFFFAOYSA-N
- SMILES: C(C#N)N(CC#N)CC#N

Properties
Chemical formula	C_{6}H_{6}N_{4}
Molar mass	134.142 g·mol^{−1}

Structure
Space group	P_{nma}
Point group	orthorhombic
Lattice constant	a = 7.1085, b = 9.9320, c = 9.3869

Hazards
- GHS labelling
Pictograms	(GHS06: Toxic) (GHS07: Exclamation mark) (GHS08: Health hazard)
Signal word	Danger
Hazard statements	H301, H302, H312, H315, H319, H335, H373
Precautionary statements	P260, P264, P270, P271, P280, P301+P310, P301+P312, P302+P352, P304+P340, P305+P351+P338, P312, P314, P321, P322, P330, P332+P313, P337+P313, P362, P363, P403+P233, P405, P501
- Except where otherwise noted, data are given for materials in their standard state (at 25 °C [77 °F], 100 kPa). Infobox references

Nitrilotriacetonitrile (NTAN) is a precursor for nitrilotriacetic acid (NTA, a biodegradable complexing agent and building block for detergents), for tris(2-aminoethyl)amine (a tripodal tetradentate chelating agent known under the abbreviation tren) and for the epoxy resin crosslinker aminoethylpiperazine.

== Production ==
The synthesis of nitrilotriacetonitrile is based on the basic building blocks ammonia, formaldehyde and hydrogen cyanide, which are reacted (via the triple cyanomethylation of the ammonia) in acidic aqueous medium in discontinuous or continuous processes.

Synthesis of nitrilotriacetonitrile NTAN

Ammonia is introduced as a gas, in form of hexamethylenetetramine or as ammonium sulfate together with formaldehyde as aqueous solution (usually 37% by weight) at pH values <2 and treated with aqueous prussic acid solution or liquid hydrogen cyanide at temperatures around 100 °C. Prussic acid is used directly from the Andrussow process or the BMA process of Evonik Degussa without pre-purification if necessary. When the mother liquors are returned, yields of more than 90% are achieved.

Problematic, particularly in the case of a continuous process, is the tendency of NTAN to precipitate at temperatures below 90 °C which can lead to clogging of tube reactors and conduits and thermal runaway of the reaction.

== Properties ==
Nitrilotriacetonitrile is a colorless and odorless solid which dissolves hardly in water but dissolves well in nitromethane and acetone.

== Use ==
Nitrilotriacetonitrile can be homopolymerized or copolymerized with iminodiacetonitrile in the melt in the presence of basic catalysts such as sodium methoxide to form dark-colored solid polymers which can be carbonized to form nitrogen-containing and electrically conductive polymers at temperatures above 1000 °C. The products obtained have not found application as conductive polymers.

The hydrogenation of NTAN first converts a cyano group into an imino group which attacks a cyano group (which are adjacent and sterically suitable for forming a six-membered ring) rather than being further hydrogenated to the primary amino group. The end product of the catalytic hydrogenation of nitrilotriacetonitrile is therefore 1-(2-aminoethyl)piperazine.

Synthesis of aminoethylpiperazine by hydrogenation of NTAN

If the catalytic hydrogenation of NTAN is carried out with e. g. Raney nickel in the presence of a large excess of ammonia, it gives tris(2-aminoethyl)amine.

Synthesis of tris (2-aminoethyl) amine(tren)

Tris(2-aminoethyl)amine is used as a tetrazident complexing agent (abbreviated as "tren"), which forms stable chelates, particularly with divalent and trivalent transition metal ions.

Nitrilotriacetonitrile reacts with methanal at pH 9.5 to give 2,2-dihydroxymethyl-nitrilotriacetonitrile, which is hydrolyzed with sodium hydroxide solution at 100 °C to give the trisodium salt of 2-hydroxymethylserine-N,N-diacetic acid, from which the free acid can be obtained by acidification in 51% yield.

Synthesis of 2-hydroxymethylserine-N, N-diacetic acid trisodium salt from NTAN

The compound is suitable as a complexing agent for heavy metal ions or alkaline earth metal ions, as a stabilizer for bleaching agents (e.g. for sodium perborate, in solid detergent preparations) and as a builder in detergents for inhibiting the formation of incrustations in textiles during laundering.

The hydrolysis of nitrilotriacetonitrile with water in concentrated sulfuric acid yields under gentle conditions practically quantitatively nitrilotriacetamide, which has been investigated as a neutral tetradentate ligand for metal complexation. At elevated temperature, 3,5-dioxopiperazine-1-acetamide is formed by ring closure, which can be quantitatively converted into the nitrilotriacetamide after neutralization and heating with excess aqueous ammonia.

Synthesis of nitrilotracetamide (and 3,5-dioxopiperazine-1-acetamide)

Nitrilotriacetonitrile serves mainly as a raw material for the production of the biodegradable, but carcinogen suspected complexing agent nitrilotriacetic acid by acid or base-catalyzed hydrolysis of the cyano groups.

Alkaline hydrolysis of NTAN to NTA trisodium salt

Undesirable residual contents of cyanide ions in the hydrolyzate can be removed by post-treatment with oxidizing agents such as sodium hypochlorite at pH 8.
