= Polyurethane dispersion =

Chintan patel

Polyurethane dispersion, or PUD, is understood to be a polyurethane polymer resin dispersed in water, rather than a solvent, although some cosolvent may be used. Its manufacture involves the synthesis of polyurethanes having carboxylic acid functionality or nonionic hydrophiles like PEG (polyethylene glycol) incorporated into, or pendant from, the polymer backbone. Two component polyurethane dispersions are also available.

== Background ==
There has been a general trend towards converting existing resin systems to waterborne resins, for ease of use and environmental considerations. Particularly, their development was driven by increased demand for solventless systems since the manufacture of coatings and adhesives entailed the increasing release of solvents into the atmosphere from numerous sources. Using VOC exempt solvents is not a panacea as they have their own weaknesses.

The problem has always been that polyurethanes in water are not stable, reacting to produce a urea and carbon dioxide. Many papers and patents have been published on the subject. For environmental reasons there is even a push to have PUD available both water-based and bio-based or made from renewable raw materials. PUDs are used because of the general desire to formulate coatings, adhesives, sealants and elastomers based on water rather than solvent, and because of the perceived or assumed benefits to the environment.

== Synthesis ==
The techniques and manufacturing processes have changed over the years from those described in the first papers, journal articles and patents that were published. There are a number of techniques available depending on what type of species is required. An ion may be formed which can be an anion thus forming an anionic PUD or a cation may be formed forming a cationic PUD. Also, it is possible to synthesize a non-ionic PUD. This involves using materials that will produce an ethylene oxide backbone, or similar, or a water-soluble chain pendant from the main polymer backbone.

Anionic PUDs are by far the most common available commercially. To produce these, initially a polyurethane prepolymer is manufactured in the usual way but instead of just using isocyanate and polyol, a modifier is included in the polymer backbone chain or pendant from the main backbone. This modifier is/was mainly dimethylol propionic acid (DMPA). This molecule contains two hydroxy groups and a carboxylic acid group. The OH groups react with the isocyanate groups to produce an NCO terminated prepolymer but with a pendant COOH group. This is now dispersed under shear in water with a suitable neutralizing agent such as triethylamine. This reacts with the carboxylic acid forming a salt which is water soluble. Usually, a diamine chain extender is then added to produce a polyurethane dispersed in water with no free NCO groups but with polyurethane and polyurea segments. Dytek A is commonly used as the chain extender. Various papers and patents show that an amine chain extender with more than two functionalities such as a triamine may be used too. Chain extender studies have been carried out.

There is also a push to have a synthesis strategy that is non-isocyanate based. When blocked isocyanates are used there is no isocyanate (NCO) functionality and hence the water reaction producing carbon dioxide so dispersion is easier. Modifiers other than DMPA have been researched.

It is also possible to introduce hydrophilicity into the polymeric molecule by using a modified chain extender rather than doing so in the polymer backbone or a pendant chain. Lower viscosity materials are often the result, as well as higher solids. A variation on this technique is to incorporate sulfonate groups. PUD/polyacrylate blends can be prepared this way also utilizing internal emulsifiers.

Cationic PUD also introduce hydrophilic components when synthesized. This includes phosphonium entities. Techniques have and are being researched to improve the performance and water resistance properties by various techniques. This includes introducing star-branched polydimethylsiloxane.

Research has been done and published that shows it is not the dispersion speed, mechanical agitation or high shear mixing that has the biggest effect on properties, but rather the chemical makeup. However, particle size distribution can be controlled by this to some extent.

== Uses ==
They find use in coatings, adhesives, sealants and elastomers. Specific uses include industrial coatings, UV coating resins, floor coatings, hygiene coatings, wood coatings, adhesives, concrete coatings, automotive coatings, clear coatings and anticorrosive applications. They are also used in the design and manufacture of medical devices such as the polyurethane dressing, a liquid bandage based on polyurethane dispersion. To improve their functionality in flame retardant applications, products are being developed which have this feature built into the polymer molecule. They have also found use in general textile applications such as coating nonwovens. Leather coatings with antibacterial properties have also been synthesized using PUDs and silver nanoparticles. On a similar theme, recent (post 2020) innovations have included producing a waterborne polyurethane that has embedded silver particles to combat COVID. On a similar theme, PUD with antimicrobial properties have been developed.

== Weaknesses and disadvantages ==
Although they are perceived to have good environmental credentials waterborne polyurethane dispersions tend to suffer from lower mechanical strength than other resins. The use of polycarbonate based polyols in the synthesis can help overcome this weakness. The wear and corrosion resistance is also not as good and hence they are often hybridized. Other strategies used to overcome some of the weaknesses include molecular design and mixing/compounding with inorganic rather than polymeric materials. The use of an anionic or cationic center or indeed a hydrophilic non-ionic manufacturing technique tends to result in a permanent inbuilt water resistance weakness. Research is being conducted and techniques developed to combat this weakness. Simple blending has also been employed. This has the advantage in that if no new molecule has been formed but merely blending with existing registered raw materials, then that is a way around the work required to get registration of the material under various country regimes such as REACH in Europe and TSCA in the United States. Because of the surface tension of water being so high, pinholes and other problems of air-entrainment tend to be more common and need special additives to combat. They also tend not to be manufactured with biobased polyols because vegetable based polyols don't have performance enhancing functional groups. Modification is possible to achieve this and enable even greener versions.

Drying, curing and cross-linking is also not usually as good and hence research is proceeding in the area of post crosslinking to improve these features.

== Hybrids ==
The disadvantages of PUDs are being improved by research. Hybridization using other materials and techniques is one such area. PUDs that are waterborne and UV curable are being intensely researched with well over 100 research papers produced in the 2000-2020 time period. Waterborne PUD- Acrylates based on epoxidized soybean oil that is also UV curable have been produced and are feasible. The nature of the acrylate affects the properties. One use of hybrids is in textile finishes.

As ionic centers are introduced with waterborne PUDs, the water resistance and uptake in the final film has been studied extensively. The nature of the polyol and the level of COOH groups and hydrophobic modification with other moieties can improve this property. Polyester polyols give the biggest improvements. Polycarbonate polyols also enhance properties, especially if the polycarbonate is also fluorinated. Reinforcing PUDs with nanomaterials also improves properties, as does silicone modification.

To make PUDs more hydrophobic and water repellent and thus remove a weakness, a number of techniques have been researched. One way is to add hydroxyethyl acrylate to the polyol reacting with isocyanate. Once the PUD is made it will have terminal double bond functionality from the acrylate. This may now be copolymerized with a very hydrophobic acrylate such as stearyl acrylate using free radical techniques. This long alkyl chain introduced confers hydrophobicity.

Another method of hybridization is to make a PUD that is both anionic but with a very substantial nonionic modification utilizing a polyether polyol based on ethylene oxide. In addition, a silicone diol maybe incorporated.

As epoxy resins have some outstanding properties, research using epoxy to modify PUD is taking place.

PUDs that are based on thiol rather than hydroxyl and also modified with both acrylate as well as epoxy functionality have been produced and researched.

As PUDs are resin dispersed in water, when cast as a film and dried they are inherently high gloss. They can be designed to be matte/flat by incorporating siloxane functionality.

Since PUDs are usually considered green and environmentally friendly, techniques being researched also include capturing carbon dioxide from the atmosphere to make the raw materials and then further synthesis.

== See also ==
- Coatings
- Polymer science
- Synthetic resin
- Water
- Waterborne resins
