= Cement render =

Mortar mix of sand and cement for wall application

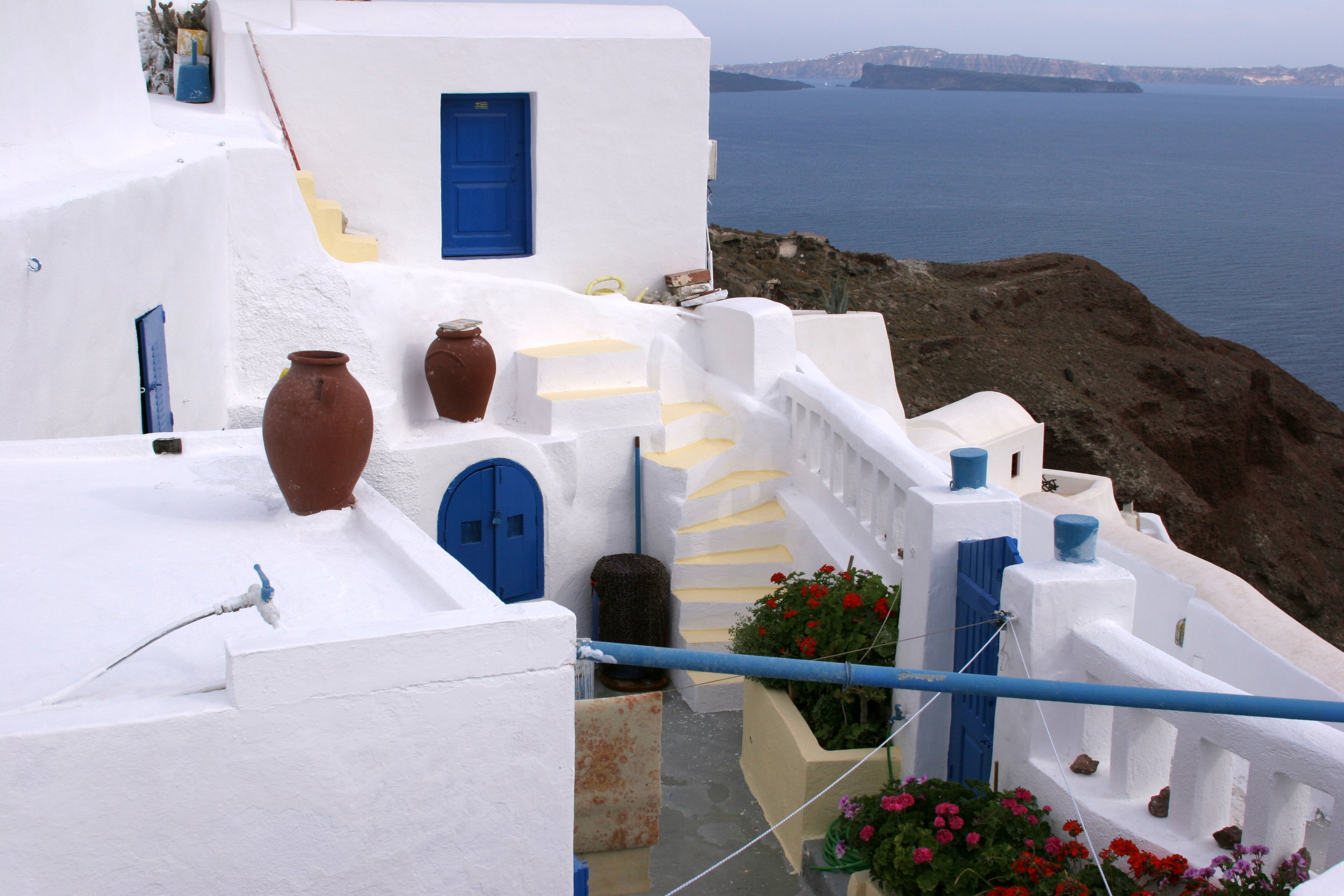
Rendered house in Greece

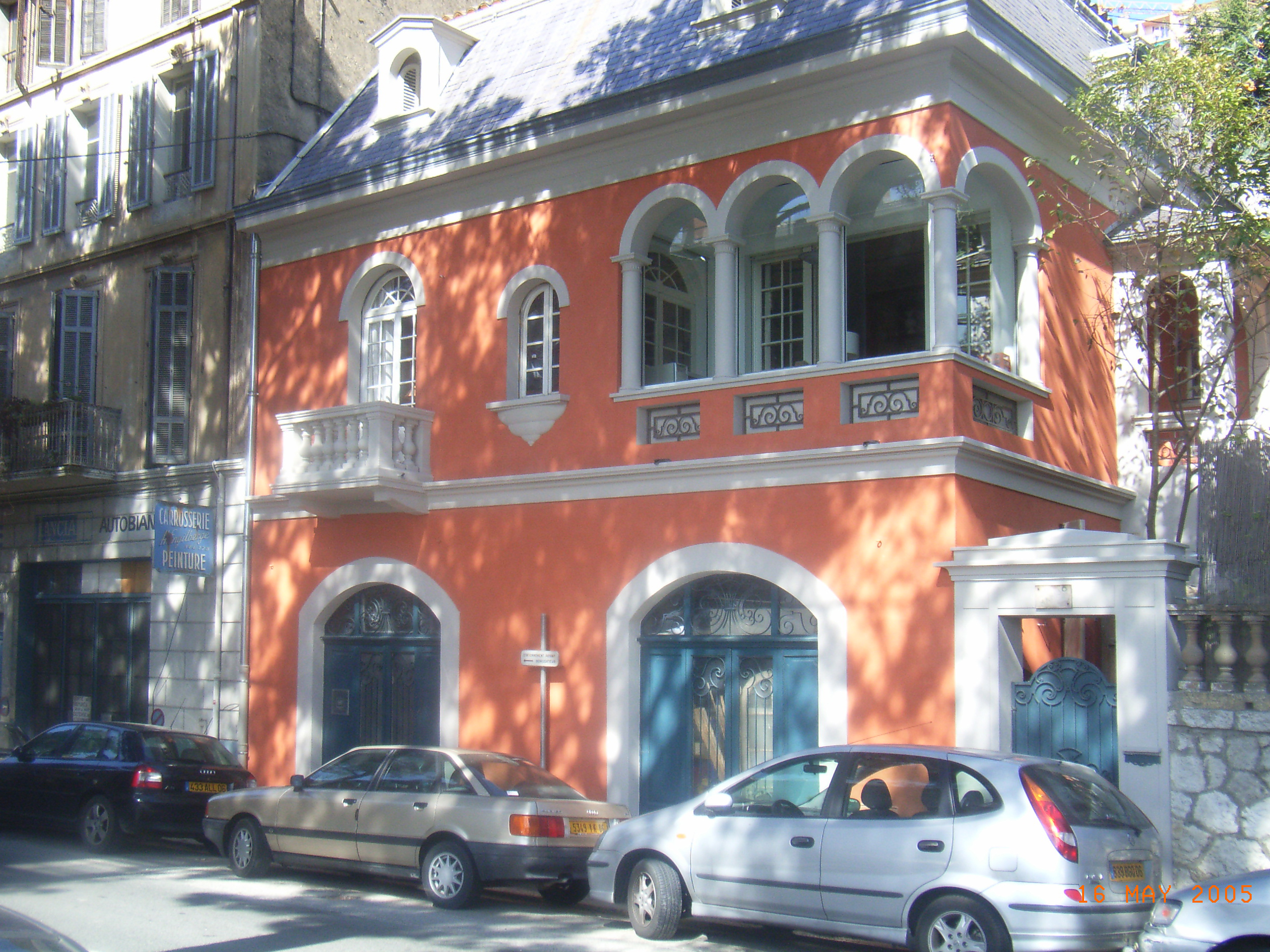
Rendered house in France

Cement render or cement plaster is the application of a mortar mix of sand and cement, (optionally lime) and water to brick, concrete, stone, or mud brick. It is often textured, colored, or painted after application. It is generally used on exterior walls but can be used to feature an interior wall. Depending on the 'look' required, rendering can be fine or coarse, textured or smooth, natural or colored, pigmented or painted.

The cement rendering of brick, concrete and mud houses has been used for centuries to improve the appearance (and sometimes weather resistance) of exterior walls. It can be seen in different forms all over southern Europe. Different countries have their own styles and traditional colors. In the United Kingdom, cement is optional. In other countries, lime is optional. The cement in render hydrates the same way it does in concrete.

== Render finishes ==
Different finishes can be created by using different tools such as trowels, sponges, or brushes. The art in traditional rendering is (apart from getting the mix right) the appearance of the top coat. Different tradesmen have different finishing styles and are able to produce different textures and decorative effects. Some of these special finishing effects may need to be created with a thin finishing top coat or a finishing wash.

== Traditional rendering ==
Cement render consists of 6 parts clean sharp fine sand, 1 part cement, and 1 part lime in some parts of the world. The lime makes the render more workable and reduces cracking when the render dries. Any general purpose cement can be used. Various additives can be added to the mix to increase adhesion. Coarser sand is used in the base layer and slightly finer sand in the top layer.

The application process resembles the process of applying paint. To ensure adhesion, the surface to be rendered is initially hosed off to ensure it is free of any dirt and loose particles. Old paint or old render is scraped away. The surface is roughened to improve adhesion. For large areas, vertical battens are fixed to the wall every 1 to 1.5 meters, to keep the render flat and even.

== Acrylic rendering ==
There is also a wide variety of premixed renders commercially available for different situations. Some have a polymer additive added to the traditional cement, lime and sand mix for enhanced water resistance, flexibility and adhesion.

Acrylic premixed renders have superior water resistance and strength. They can be used on a wider variety of surfaces than cement render, including concrete, cement blocks, and AAC concrete paneling. These acrylic modified renders may still be too brittle and cannot be applied over substrates like fiber cement sheeting, as they will crack on the joints and can allow water to enter the sheet and cause delamination of the coatings. The newer technology polymer exterior cladding such as expanded polystyrene (EPS) can have these acrylic modified renders applied to them with the inclusion of an alkali resistant mesh encapsulated between the render coats. Some premixed acrylic renders have a smoother complexion than traditional renders. There are also many various acrylic-bound pigmented 'designer' finishing coats that can be applied over acrylic render. Various finishes, patterns and textures are possible such as sand, sandstone, marble, stone, stone chip, lime wash or clay like finishes. There are stipple, glistening finishes, and those with enhanced water resistance and antifungal properties. Depending upon the product, they can be rolled, troweled or sponged on. A limited number can also be sprayed on. Acrylic renders usually take only 2 days to dry and thus much faster than the usual 28 days for traditional render.

A disadvantage of acrylic render vs. traditional rendering is that acrylic render lacks the sustainability and environmental compatibility of traditional cement-and-mineral render. All buildings have a finite lifetime, and their materials will eventually be either recycled or absorbed into the environment. As acrylics are synthetic polymers, they do not break down by natural weathering the same way that a cement, sand, and lime mixture will, and so will persist in the natural environment for much longer as synthetic chemical compounds that have unknown long-term effects on ecosystems. Also, the application and drying process of solvent based acrylic resin render involves the atmospheric evaporation of pollutant solvents—necessary for the application of the resin—which are hazardous to the health of humans and of many organisms on which humans depend. Synthetic polymers such as acrylic are manufactured from chemical feedstocks such as acetone, hydrogen cyanide, ethylene, isobutylene, and other petroleum derivatives. The polymer products cannot be fully recycled (using present technology or any that can be confidently expected to be developed), so new raw materials, taken from the finite and diminishing supply of raw natural resources, must always be put into their manufacture, making the process unsustainable. Traditional cement-based render does not have these problems, making it an arguably better choice in many cases, despite its working limitations. Using Waterborne resins will not have these disadvantages.

== See also ==
- Exterior insulation finishing system
- Harling (wall finish)
- Lath and plaster
- Pargeting
- Plaster
- Plasterwork
- Polished plaster
- Siding
- Stucco
- Tadelakt
