= Dimethylolpropionic acid =

Organic compound with one carboxyl and two hydroxyl groups

Names
- Preferred IUPAC name 3-Hydroxy-2-(hydroxymethyl)-2-methylpropanoic acid
- Other names 2,2-Bis(hydroxymethyl)propionic acid; Hhmp

Identifiers
CAS Number	4767-03-7
3D model (JSmol)	Interactive image
ChEMBL	ChEMBL3183172
ChemSpider	70865
ECHA InfoCard	100.023.006
EC Number	225-306-3
PubChem CID	78501
UNII	4NHI8V17MN
CompTox Dashboard (EPA)	DTXSID4027577
- InChI: InChI=1S/C5H10O4/c1-5(2-6,3-7)4(8)9/h6-7H,2-3H2,1H3,(H,8,9) Key: PTBDIHRZYDMNKB-UHFFFAOYSA-N
- SMILES: CC(CO)(CO)C(=O)O

Properties
Chemical formula	C_{5}H_{10}O_{4}
Molar mass	134.131 g·mol^{−1}
Melting point	190 °C (374 °F; 463 K)

Hazards
- GHS labelling
Pictograms	(GHS07: Exclamation mark)
Signal word	Warning
Hazard statements	H319, H335
Precautionary statements	P261, P264, P271, P280, P304+P340, P305+P351+P338, P312, P337+P313, P403+P233, P405, P501

Related compounds
Related compounds	Isobutyric acid
- Except where otherwise noted, data are given for materials in their standard state (at 25 °C [77 °F], 100 kPa). Infobox references

Dimethylolpropionic acid (DMPA) is a chemical compound that has the full IUPAC name of 2,2-bis(hydroxymethyl)propionic acid and is an organic compound with one carboxyl and two hydroxy groups. It has the CAS Registry Number of 4767–03–7.

== Properties ==
DMPA is an odorless free flowing white crystalline solid and essentially non-toxic. DMPA has two different functional groups hydroxyl and carboxylic acid so the molecule can be used for a wide variety of syntheses. In addition to reaction with other chemicals, DMPA can also react with itself to produce esters via esterification, as one example.

== Uses ==
One key use of DMPA is in the field of coatings and adhesives. It is used as a modifier in the production of anionic Polyurethane dispersions. Solvent soluble binders/resins for coatings can be converted into an aqueous binder with the use of this material. In this case it is reacted with a suitable diisocyanate such as isophorone diisocyanate or TMXDI usually along with other polyols to make a prepolymer.

Reaction of DMPA with TMXDI

There is also the possibility of using 2,2-bis(hydroxymethyl)propionic acid for the synthesis of dendrimeric molecules, also known as hyperbranched molecules. When each hydroxyl group is reacted with 2,2-bis (hydroxymethyl) propionic acid, the number of hydroxyl groups present in the molecule doubles. Repeating this reaction step, produces one more shell each time and thus the molecule grows. If at the end the hydroxyl groups are reacted with a bifunctional component, dendrimeric UV binders can be produced, for example. Dendrimeric molecules have low solution viscosities and improved properties.

It has a wide variety of other uses including production of hyperbranched polyesters, waterborne polyesters, waterbased alkyd resins, and aqueous epoxy resins. It has even found use in polyethylene terephthalate fiber production. Another use is in the medical field for drug release purposes. In the business world it has been cited as an outstanding growth opportunity

== See also ==
- Prepolymer
- Waterborne resins
