= Paint By DS =

2008 video game

- Developer(s): Ertain
- Publisher(s): Mercury Games (UK)
- Platform(s): Nintendo DS
- Release: EU: February 29, 2008
- Genre(s): Simulation
- Mode(s): Single player

Paint By DS is a painting simulator developed by Japanese studio Ertain for the Nintendo DS. The game challenges players to recreate classic artworks with the DS stylus. It allows players to recreate pieces from artists such as Van Gogh. Players can mix oil-based and water-based paints. There are 15 different paintings players can manipulate, and one can zoom in to create finer details, and add water to decrease the intensity of colors. It is rated E for Everyone and has an average rating of 44 out of 100 based on critic reviews.

== Reception ==
Reception

Aggregate score
| Aggregator | Score |
|---|---|
| Metacritic | 44/100 |

Review scores
| Publication | Score |
|---|---|
| Eurogamer | 4/10 |
| Pocket Gamer | 1.5/5 |

Paint By DS received "generally unfavorable" reviews from critics, according to the review aggregator Metacritic.
