= PUD =

PUD may refer to:

- Planned unit development
- Public utility district
- Peptic ulcer disease
- Peeled undeveined shrimp
- Polyurethane dispersion
- Unitary Platform or Plataforma Unitaria Democrática, an opposition political party in Venezuela
