= Water miscible oil paint =

Water-miscible oil paint (also called water-soluble oil paint or water-mixable oil paint) is oil paint either engineered to be hydrophilic or to which an emulsifier has been added, allowing it to be thinned and cleaned up with water. These paints make it possible to avoid using, or at least reduce the use of, volatile organic compounds such as turpentine that may be harmful if inhaled. Water-miscible oil paint can be mixed and applied using the same techniques as traditional oil-based paint, but while still wet it can be removed from brushes, palettes, and rags with ordinary soap and water. One way it is made water soluble is through the use of an oil medium in which one end of the molecule has been engineered to be hydrophilic and thus bind loosely to water molecules, as in a solution.

A precursor to water-miscible oil paint is "tempera grassa", an egg tempera method where oil paint is mixed with the tempera and the egg acts an emulsifier to be used for glazing underpaintings and providing added luminosity to paintings.

== Handling in comparison with other media ==
The traditional rule of gradation of layers — "fat over lean," or flexible over less flexible — applies to water miscible oil paint as it does to traditional oil, and in this respect the two kinds of paint behave in the same way. However, their handling is slightly different: when thinned with water to a considerably liquid phase, water miscible oil paint tends to feel and behave like watercolor (although, unlike watercolor, and to a greater extent than traditional oil, it may lose adhesion to the ground or support if over-thinned); by contrast, when used as a short paste without water for heavy impasto work, it tends to drag, developing a consistency somewhat "gummier" or tackier than the more buttery one characteristic of oils. At midrange (between short paste and long paste) water miscible oil paint is gouache-like, sharing the properties of both transparent watercolor and opaque oil (in the manner of watercolor, for example, some colors will darken upon drying, the more so as more water is mixed into the paint, and in the manner of oil, the paint film will have some thickness to it). Also gouache-like is the overall effect, which tends to be matte as compared to the glossier oil, but this too is a property that will vary, depending on the pigment used and on any mediums (or diluents) mixed into it, as well as on the pastiness of the paint (as a general rule, the pastier, the glossier). The handling of water miscible oil paint, in summary, changes considerably as it passes from one phase to another.

== See also ==
- Waterborne resins
