= Synthetic resin =

Synthetic materials with properties similar to natural resins

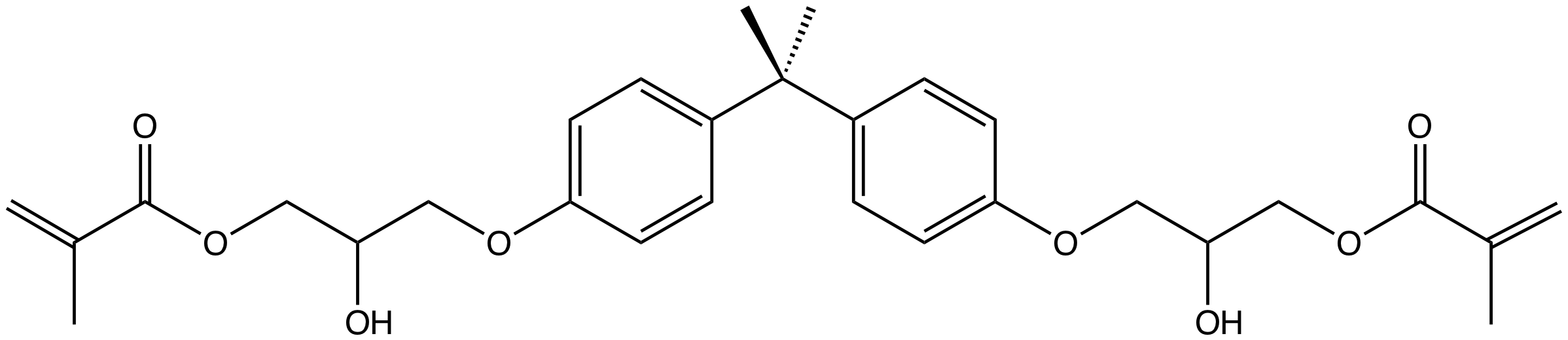
Vinyl ester resin is an example of a synthetic resin.

Synthetic resin is an industrially produced, typically viscous substance that converts into rigid polymers by the process of curing. They are formed by the reaction of dibasic organic acids and polyhydric alcohols. In order to undergo curing, resins typically contain reactive groups, such as acrylates or epoxides. Some synthetic resins have properties similar to natural plant resins, but many do not.

Synthetic resins are of several classes. Some are manufactured by esterification of organic compounds. Some are thermosetting plastics in which the term "resin" is loosely applied to the reactant(s), the product, or both. "Resin" may be applied to one or more monomers in a copolymer, the other being called a "hardener", as in epoxy resins. For thermosetting plastics that require only one monomer, the monomer compound is the "resin". For example, liquid methyl methacrylate is often called the "resin" or "casting resin" while in the liquid state, before it polymerizes and "sets". After setting, the resulting poly(methyl methacrylate) (PMMA) is often renamed "acrylic glass" or "acrylic" (trade names include Plexiglas and Lucite).

== Uses ==
Synthetic resins are also used extensively in cured-in-place pipe applications. Departments of transportation in the United States also specify them for use as overlays on roads and bridges. In this application, they are known as polyester concrete overlays (PCO). These are usually based on isophthalic acid and cut with styrene at high levels—usually up to 50%. Synthetic resins are also used in anchor bolt adhesives, though epoxy based materials are also used. Many companies have and continue to introduce styrene-free systems mainly due to odor issues, but also over concerns that styrene is a potential carcinogen. Drinking water applications also prefer styrene-free resins.

Dental restorative materials based on bis-GMA-containing resins can break down into or be contaminated with the related compound bisphenol A, a potential endocrine disruptor. However, no negative health effects of bis-GMA use in dental resins have been found.

== Types ==
There are a number of materials which may be described as "synthetic resin". One variety is epoxy resin, manufactured through polymerization-polyaddition or polycondensation reactions and used as a thermoset polymer for adhesives and composites. Accordingly, it has mainly seen use in industrial flooring purposes since the 1960s. Since 2000, however, epoxy and polyurethane resins are used in interiors as well, mainly in Western Europe.

Synthetic "casting resin" for embedding display objects in Plexiglas/Lucite (PMMA) is simply methyl methacrylate liquid, into which a polymerization catalyst is added and mixed, causing it to "set" (polymerize). The polymerization creates a block of PMMA plastic ("acrylic glass") which holds the display object inside a transparent block.

Another synthetic polymer sometimes called by the same general name is acetal resin. By contrast with the other synthetics, however, it has a simple chain structure with the repeat unit of form −[CH_{2}O]−. Ion-exchange resins are used in water purification and catalysis of organic reactions. (See also AT-10 resin, melamine resin.) Certain ion-exchange resins are also used pharmaceutically as bile acid sequestrants, mainly as hypolipidemic agents, although they may be used for purposes other than lowering cholesterol. Solvent impregnated resins (SIRs) are porous resin particles which contain an additional liquid extractant inside the porous matrix. The contained extractant is supposed to enhance the capacity of the resin particles. The production of PVC entails the production of "vinyl chloride resins", which differ in the degree of polymerization.

Silicone resins are silicone-based polymers that exhibit various useful properties like weatherability (durability), dielectricity, water repellency, thermal stability, and chemical inertness.

== Composition ==
Most synthetic resins are viscous, pale coloured liquids consisting of a solution of a polyester in a reactive diluent which is usually styrene, but can also include vinyl toluene and various acrylates.

Unsaturated polyesters are condensation polymers formed from polyols (also known as polyhydric alcohols), which have multiple alcohol or hydroxy functional groups. These are treated with unsaturated and, in some cases, saturated dibasic acids. Typical polyols used are glycols including ethylene glycol, propylene glycol, and diethylene glycol; typical acids include phthalic acid, isophthalic acid, terephthalic acid, and maleic anhydride. Water, a condensation by-product of esterification reactions, is continuously removed by distillation, driving the esterification. Unsaturated polyesters are generally sold to parts manufacturers as a solution of resin in reactive diluent. Styrene is the most common diluent and the industry standard. The diluent allows control over the viscosity of the resin and serves as a participant in the curing reaction. The initially-liquid resin is converted to a solid by cross-linking. Crosslinking is induced by free radical initiators. Unsaturation is generally in the form of maleate and fumarate species along the polymer chain. Maleate/fumarate generally does not self-polymerize via radical reactions, but readily reacts with styrene. Maleic anhydride and styrene are known to form alternating copolymers and represent the textbook case of this phenomenon. This compatibility is one reason that styrene has been so difficult to displace in the market as the industry standard reactive diluent, despite increasing efforts to displace the material such as California's Proposition 65. The initial free radicals are induced by adding a compound that easily decomposes into free radicals. This compound is known as the "catalyst" within the industry, but initiator is a more appropriate term. Transition metal salts are usually added as a catalyst for the chain-growth crosslinking reaction, and in the industry this type of additive is known as a promoter; the promoter is generally understood to lower the bond dissociation energy of the radical initiator. Cobalt salts are the most common type of promoter used. Common radical initiators used are organic peroxides such as benzoyl peroxide or methyl ethyl ketone peroxide.

Synthetic resins are thermosetting and, as with other resins, cure exothermically. The use of excessive initiator especially with a catalyst present can therefore cause charring or even ignition during the curing process. Excess catalyst may also cause the product to fracture or form a rubbery material.

Unsaturated polyesters (UPR) are utilized in many different industrially relevant markets but in general are used as the matrix material for various types of composites. Glass fiber-reinforced composites comprise the largest segment into which UPRs are used and can be processed via SMC, BMC, pultrusion, cured-in-place pipe (known as relining in Europe), filament winding, vacuum molding, spray-up molding, and resin transfer molding (RTM). Wind turbine blades are one notable example of such composites. UPRs are also used in non-reinforced applications with common examples being gel coats, shirt buttons, mine-bolts, bowling ball cores, polymer concrete, and engineered stone/cultured marble.

== Chemistry ==
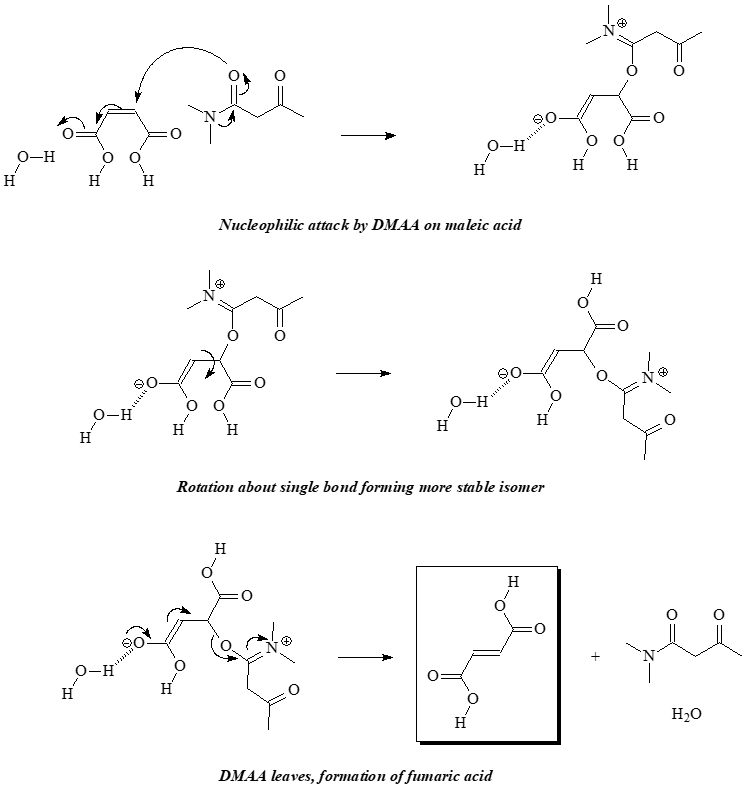
Mechanism for the DMAA catalyzed isomerization of maleate to fumarate

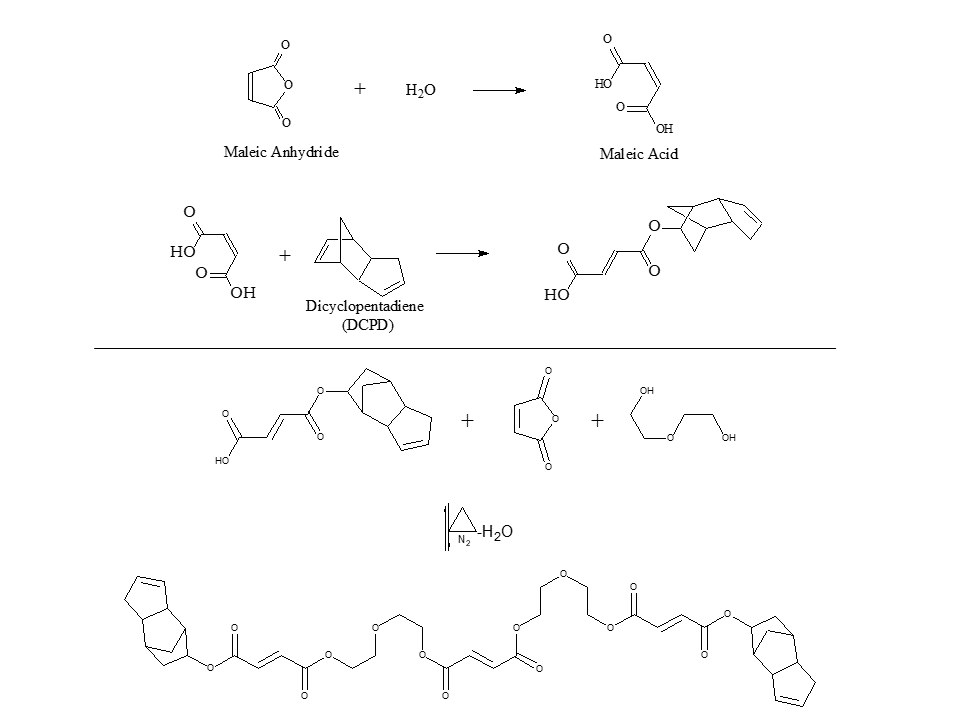
Example of a DCPD resin

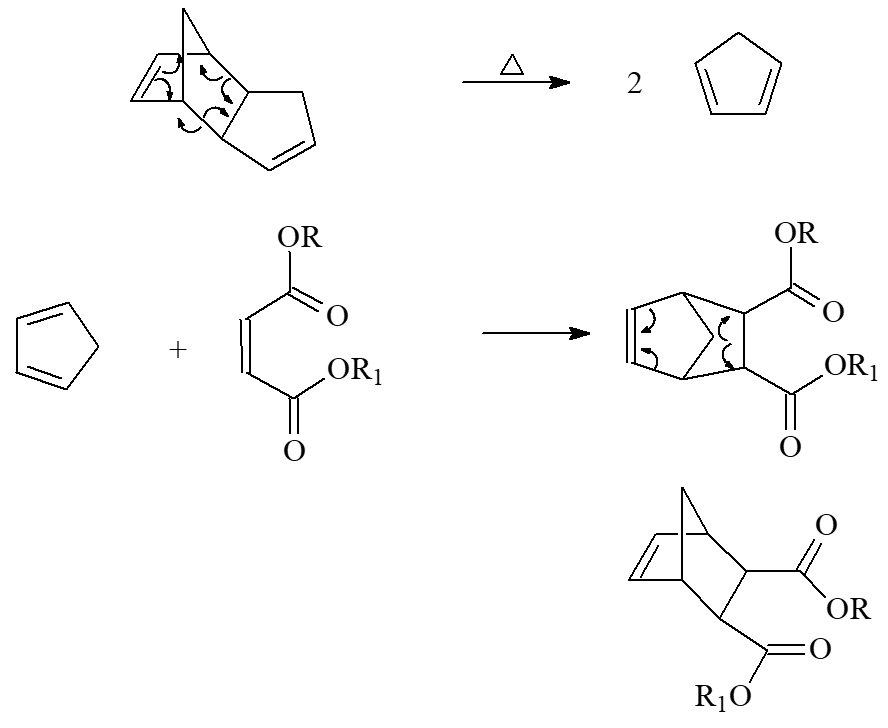
Example of a Nadic

In organic chemistry, an ester is formed as the condensation product of a carboxylic acid and an alcohol, with water formed as the condensate by-product. An ester can also be produced with an acyl halide and an alcohol, in which case the condensate by-product is a hydrogen halide.

Polyesters are a category of polymers in which ester functionality repeats within the main chain. Polyesters are a classic example of step-growth polymer, in which a difunctional (or higher order) acid or acyl halide is reacted with a difunctional (or higher order) alcohol. Polyesters are produced commercially both as saturated and unsaturated resins. The most common and highest volume produced polyester is polyethylene terephthalate (PET), which is an example of a saturated polyester and finds use in such applications as fibers for clothing and carpet, food and liquid containers (such as water and soda bottles), and films.

In unsaturated polyester (UPR) chemistry, unsaturation sites are present along the chain, usually by the incorporation of maleic anhydride, but maleic acid and fumaric acid are also used. Maleic acid and fumaric acid are isomers where maleic is the cis-isomer and fumaric is the trans-isomer. The ester forms of these two molecules are maleate and fumarate, respectively. When curing a UPR, the fumarate form is known to react more rapidly with the styrene radical, so isomerization catalysts, such as N,N-dimethylacetoacetamide (DMAA), are often employed in the synthesis process which converts the maleates into fumarates; the isomerization can also be encouraged with increased reaction time and temperature. Within the UPR industry, classification of resins is generally based on the primary saturated acid. For example, a resin containing primarily terephthalic acid is known as a Tere resin, a resin containing primarily phthalic anhydride is known as an Ortho resin, and a resin containing primarily isophthalic acid is known as an Iso resin. Dicyclopentadiene (DCPD) is also a common UPR raw material and can be incorporated in two different ways. In one process, the DCPD is cracked in-situ to form cyclopentadiene, which can then be reacted with maleate/fumarate groups along the polymer chain via a Diels–Alder reaction. This type of resin is known as a Nadic resin and is referred to as a "poor man's Ortho", due to the extremely low cost of DCPD raw material while still resulting in a resin sharing many properties of an Ortho resin. In another process, maleic anhydride is first opened with water or another alcohol to form maleic acid and is then reacted with DCPD where an alcohol from the maleic acid reacts across one of the double bonds of the DCPD. This product is then used to end-cap the UPR resin which yields a product with unsaturation on the end-groups. This type of resin is referred to as a DCPD resin.

Ortho resins comprise the most common type of UPR, and many are known as general purpose resins. FRP composites utilizing ortho resins are found in such application as boat hulls, bath ware, and bowling ball cores.

Iso resins are generally on the higher end of UPR products, because of both the relatively higher cost of the isophthalic acid and the superior properties they possess. Iso resins are the primary type of resin used in gel coat applications, which are similar to paints but are sprayed into a mold before the FRP is molded, leaving a coating on the part. Gel coat resins must have lower color (almost clear) so as to not impart additional color to the part or so they can be dyed properly. Gel coats must also have strong resistance to UV-weathering and water blistering.

Tere resins are often used when high modulus and strength are desired, but the low color properties of an Iso resin are not necessary. Terephthalic acid is generally lower cost than isophthalic acid, but both give similar strength characteristics to a UPR product. There exists a special sub-set of Tere resins, known as PET UPR resins, which are produced by catalytically cracking PET resin in the reactor to yield a mixture of terephthalic acid and ethylene glycol. Additional acids and glycols are then added along with maleic anhydride and a new polymer is produced. The end product is functionally the same as a Tere resin but can often be lower cost to manufacture, as scrap PET can be sourced cheaply. If a glycol-modified PET (PET-G) is used, exceptional properties can be imparted to the resin due to some of the exotic materials used in PET-G production. Tere and PET-UPR resins are used in many applications including cured-in-place pipe.

== Advantages ==
Synthetic resin offers the following advantages:

1. Adequate resistance to water and variety of chemicals.
2. Adequate resistance to weathering and ageing.
3. Low cost.
4. Polyesters can withstand a temperature up to 80 °C.
5. Polyesters have good wetting to glass fibres.
6. Relatively low shrinkage at between 4–8% during curing.
7. Linear thermal expansion ranges from 100–200 × 10^{−6} K^{−1}.

== Disadvantages ==
Synthetic resin has the following disadvantages:

1. Strong styrene odour
2. More difficult to mix than other resins, such as a two-part epoxy
3. The toxic nature of its fumes, and especially of its catalyst, MEKP, pose a safety risk if proper protection isn't used
4. Not appropriate for bonding many substrates
5. The finished cure is most likely weaker than an equal amount of an epoxy resin

== See also ==
- Polyester
- Styrene
- Thermoset polymer matrix
- Thermosetting polymer
- Vinyl ester
- Prepolymer
- Resin casting
- Waterborne resins
