= VOC exempt solvent =

Volatile organic compounds exempt from regular restrictions

VOC exempt solvents are organic compounds that the United States Environmental Protection Agency (EPA) excludes from typical regulations meant to reduce ozone (smog) pollution placed on volatile organic compounds (VOCs). These compounds which are exempted from the VOC definition no longer need to be tracked and reported to the EPA as part of VOC emissions. Ozone (O3) is formed through photochemical reactions involving sunlight, VOCs, and NOx in the atmosphere, VOC exempt solvents include compounds which have less photochemical reactivity, leading to significantly less contribution to harmful ozone pollution than regulated VOCs do. Even though VOC exempt solvents have little impact on the formation of harmful ground-level ozone in the atmosphere, these solvents may still be toxic, flammable, or present other dangers or safety concerns, and they may still be regulated through local agencies.

== History ==
On February 5th, 1976, the U.S. EPA published the "Policy Statement on Use of the Concept of Photochemical Reactivity of Organic Compounds in State Implementation Plans for Oxidant Control" (41 FR 5350). current VOC exemption program stems from the "Recommended Policy on Control of Volatile Organic Compounds" (42 FR 35314) which was published by the U.S. EPA on July 8, 1977, outlining the basis excluding certain compounds from the regulatory definition of VOCs and urging for VOC control efforts to be focused specifically on the compounds mostly contributing to ozone formation, stating new scientific discovery and SIP as motivators for the recommendations. Through granting exemptions for methane (CH_{4}), ethane (C_{2}H_{6}) and methyl chloroform (1,1,1-trichloroethane), the U.S. EPA determined these compounds had negligible photochemical reactivity.

In 1989 and 1991, two petitions from the Alliance for Responsible CFC Policy, which consisted of a group of CFC producers and users, were sent to the U.S. EPA to exempt certain HCFC classes. Likewise, the Minnesota Mining & Manufacturing Company (3M) also submitted a similar petition in 1991 regarding wanting exemption for specific classes of PFCs. One notable compound received three different petitions, all within less than one month in 1993, the first submitted by Eastman Chemical Company and Hoechst Celanese Corporation, the next by Hickory Springs Manufacturing Company, and the last by Chemical Manufacturers Association.

Over time, the U.S. EPA allowed public comments and petitions to be submitted regarding VOC exemptions, and manufacturing or industrial companies who used or created these products were often seen submitting petitions or providing comments. For instance, petitions were submitted by Chemours Company for HFO-1336mzz(E), DuPont Chemicals & Fluoroproducts (DuPont) for HFO-13336mzz(Z), Honeywell Inc regarding both HFO-1234yf and HFO-1234ze, Huntsman Corporation regarding Propylene Carbonate, Kowa America Corporation regarding Dimethyl Carbonate, Lyondell regarding TBAC, Foam Supplies, Inc. regarding Methyl Formate, Occidental Chemical Corporation regarding PCBTF, Dow Corning Company regarding VMS, and the Eastman Chemical Company regarding methyl acetate. After the U.S. EPA's original recommendations and exemptions, petitions continued steadily, increasing the number of VOC exemption rules to 69 entries as of January 2026, including individual chemical compounds, broadly defined chemical classes, and clarifications.

=== Timeline of Major VOC Exemptions ===
- 1977 (42 FR 35314) - Through the "Recommended Policy on Control of Volatile Organic Compounds", methane (CH_{4}), ethane (C_{2}H_{6}) and methyl chloroform (1,1,1-trichloroethane) were the first compounds exempted from the EPA's VOC definition).
- 1979 (44 FR 32042) - Through the notice titled "Air Quality; Clarification of Agency Policy Concerning Ozone SIP Revisions and Solvent Reactivities" Dichloromethane (methylene chloride) was exempted.
- 1980 (45 FR 48941) - Several chlorofluorocarbons and related compounds including trichlorofluoromethane (CFC-11), dichlorodifluoromethane (CFC-12), chlorodifluoromethane (HCFC-22), trifluoromethane (HFC-23), CFC-113, CFC-114, and CFC-115 were exempted.
- 1989-1991 (54 FR 1987; 56 FR 11418)) - HCFC-123, HFC-134a, HCFC-141b, and HCFC-142b were added to the exemption list. Then, additional classes of hydrochlorofluorocarbons (HCFCs), and other classes of perfluorocarbon (PFC) compounds were granted exceptions.
- 1992 (40 CFR § 51.100(s)) - The U.S. EPA formally released its definition of VOCs, along with a list of compounds determined to be exempt from regulations due to their negligible photochemical reactivity.
- 1994-1998 (59 FR 50693;60 FR 31633; 63 FR 17331) - Parachlorobenzotrifluoride (PCBTF) and volatile methylated siloxanes (VMS) were exempted in 1994. Then, acetone was exempted in 1995 and methyl acetate was exempted in 1998.
- 2004-2024 (69 FR 69290; 69 FR 69298; 74 FR 3437) - Methyl formate, propylene carbonate, dimethyl carbonate (DMC) were exempted. The U.S. EPA partially exempted tert-butyl acetate (TBAC), meaning it was exempt from VOC emissions limits and requirements but still required reporting and recordkeeping. This was because the petition proved it was around 40% the amount of zone as ethane when analyzing the earlier per-gram basis when analyzing reactivity, but the current per-mole basis proved TBAC was 1.5 times more much ozone as ethane. However, later in 2016, these requirements were removed once further testing was completed.
- 2012-2023. - The U.S. EPA has continued excluding different compounds such as hydrofluoroolefins (HFOs) including HFO-1234ze, HFO-1234yf, HFO-13336mzz(Z), and HFO-1336mzz(E).

The U.S. EPA maintains the entire history of compounds and compound classes at the Complete List of VOC Exemption Rules | US EPA, as well as the most recent additions at the Revision to the Regulatory Definition of Volatile Organic Compounds | US EPA.

The exemption of certain industrial solvents used in industrial and consumer products were essential to allow manufacturers with a means of reducing regulatory VOC content while ensuring things like coatings, adhesives, aerosols, inks, and cleaning products could still be used. For instance, when acetone received VOC-exempt status in 1995, it was seen as a major victory because it allowed manufacturers to continue using this common industrial solvent without exceeding regulatory guidelines.

== Uses ==
VOC exempt solvents are used in applications where traditional solvents are used, including:

- Coatings
- Adhesives
- Sealants
- Printing inks
- Industrial cleaning products
- Aerosols
- Chemical processing
- Elastomers

== Safety ==
VOC exempt status only refers to a compound's contribution to ozone formation. Therefore, a VOC exempt solvent should not be assumed to be indicative of the compound's overall safety. For instance, many VOC exempt compounds are flammable, toxic, or environmentally hazardous, but since they do not have high contribution to photochemical reactions, they are granted VOC exemption. Furthermore, VOC exempt solvents could be subject to regulation under other federal laws depending on their properties and hazards, specifically under Significant New Alternative Policy (SNAP) and other regulations. For instance, in 2022, the U.S. EPA concluded that methylene chloride is a hazardous solvent under Toxic Substances Control Act (TSCA) due to the risk to human health and in 2024, the U.S. EPA finalized a rule that prohibited consumers from using any products including methylene chloride, and should only be used in certain industry exemptions. However, methylene chloride still remains VOC exempt, but is classified by NESHAP as a hazardous air pollutant under Section 112 of the Clean Air Act (CAA), and was once an acceptable substitute under the Significant New Alternatives Policy program for certain applications, but is unacceptable as of January 3rd, 2017.

Even if a compound meets negligible reactivity metrics, the U.S. EPA is not required to grant a petition for an exemption of VOC if they determine that doing so is likely to result in increased risk to human health and the environment. The U.S. EPA warns that exemption from the VOC definition does not exempt a compound from other regulations related to toxicity, greenhouse gas formation potential, or other environmental safety issues.Additionally, the U.S. EPA has stated that even through a recent VOC exemption of HFO-1336mzz(E) has taken place, this compound and its more common atmospheric product trifluuoroacetic acid (TFA) are considered per- and poly- fluoroalykl substances (PFAS) under the broad definition, which could have negative human and environmental health effects of their own.

== See also ==
- Significant New Alternative Policy (SNAP)
- Toxic Substances Control Act (TSCA)
- Clean Air Act (CAA)
- National Emission Standards for Hazardous Air Pollutant (NESHAP)
- Greenhouse gas
- Ozone depletion
- Photochemical smog
- Ground-level ozone
- Secondary organic aerosol
