= Methylethyl ketone oxime =

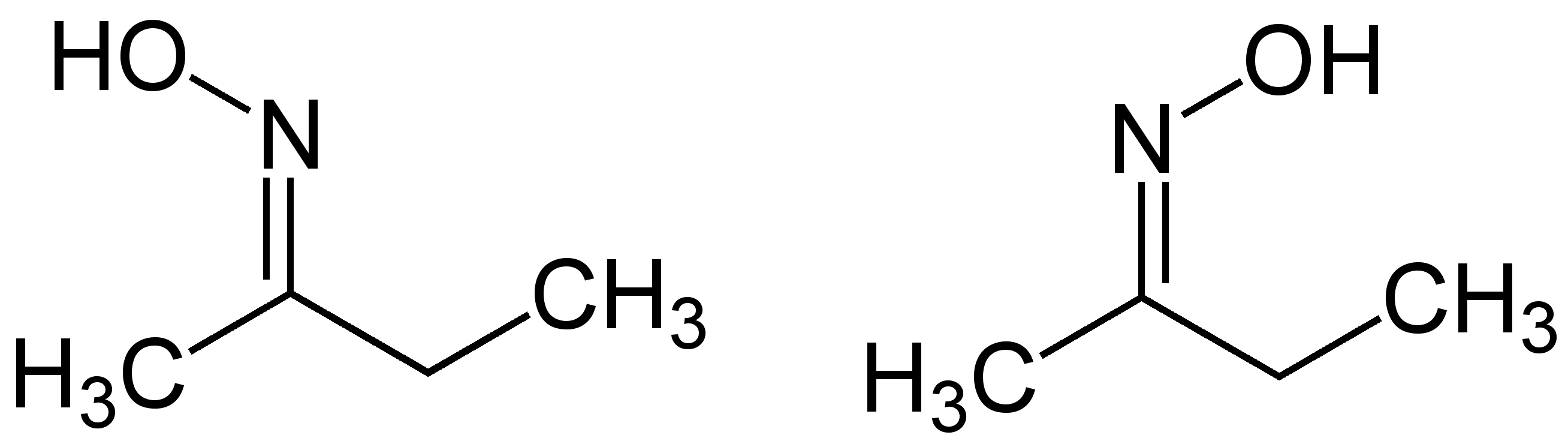
- E and Z isomers of methylethyl ketone oxime (left and right respectively)

Names
- IUPAC name (2)-N-Hydroxy-2-butanimine
- Other names MEKO, 2-Butanone oxime, 2-Butoxime

Identifiers
CAS Number	96-29-7
3D model (JSmol)	Interactive image
ChemSpider	4481809
ECHA InfoCard	100.002.270
EC Number	202-496-6
PubChem CID	5324275
UNII	51YGE935U9
CompTox Dashboard (EPA)	DTXSID1021821
- InChI: InChI=1S/C4H9NO/c1-3-4(2)5-6/h6H,3H2,1-2H3/b5-4+ Key: WHIVNJATOVLWBW-SNAWJCMRSA-N; InChI=1/C4H9NO/c1-3-4(2)5-6/h6H,3H2,1-2H3/b5-4+ Key: WHIVNJATOVLWBW-SNAWJCMRBX
- SMILES: CC/C(=N/O)/C

Properties
Chemical formula	C_{4}H_{9}NO
Appearance	colourless liquid
Density	0.923 g/cm^{3}
Melting point	−15 °C (5 °F; 258 K)
Boiling point	152 °C (306 °F; 425 K)
- Except where otherwise noted, data are given for materials in their standard state (at 25 °C [77 °F], 100 kPa). verify (what is ?) Infobox references

Methylethyl ketone oxime is the organic compound with the formula C_{2}H_{5}C(NOH)CH_{3}. This colourless liquid is the oxime derivative of methyl ethyl ketone. MEKO, as it is called in the paint industry, is used to suppress "skinning" of paints: the formation of a skin on paint before it is used. It is particularly used in alkyd paints. MEKO functions by binding the drying agents, metal salts that catalyze the oxidative crosslinking of drying oils. Once the paint is applied to a surface, MEKO evaporates, thereby allowing the drying process to proceed.

Other antiskinning agents have been used, including phenolic antioxidants (E.G butylated hydroxytoluene), but these tend to yellow the paint. This oxime is also used in some types of RTV silicones.
