= Pentaethylenehexamine =

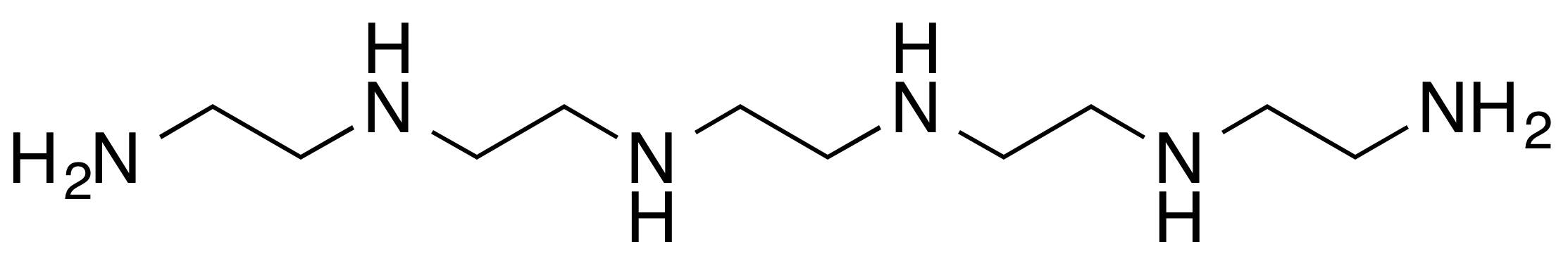

Names
- IUPAC name N′-[2-[2-[2-(2-aminoethylamino)ethylamino]ethylamino]ethyl]ethane-1,2-diamine
- Other names 1,4,7,10,13,16-Hexaazahexadecane; Pentaethylenehexaamine; 3,6,9,12-Tetra-azatetradecamethylenediamine

Identifiers
CAS Number	4067-16-7
3D model (JSmol)	Interactive image
Abbreviations	PEHA
ChEMBL	ChEMBL65184
ChemSpider	18831
ECHA InfoCard	100.021.615
EC Number	223-775-9
PubChem CID	19990
UNII	9K5VZU43LE
UN number	2735
CompTox Dashboard (EPA)	DTXSID7025843
- InChI: InChI=1S/C10H28N6/c11-1-3-13-5-7-15-9-10-16-8-6-14-4-2-12/h13-16H,1-12H2 Key: LSHROXHEILXKHM-UHFFFAOYSA-N
- SMILES: NCCNCCNCCNCCNCCN

Properties
Chemical formula	C_{10}H_{28}N_{6}
Molar mass	232.376 g·mol^{−1}
Appearance	yellowish liquid
Odor	ammonia like
Density	1
Boiling point	136–144 °C (277–291 °F; 409–417 K) 0.15 mm/Hg

Hazards
- GHS labelling
Pictograms	(GHS05: Corrosive) (GHS07: Exclamation mark) (GHS09: Environmental hazard)
Signal word	Danger
Hazard statements	H314, H317, H410
Precautionary statements	P260, P264, P272, P273, P280, P301+P330+P331, P302+P352, P303+P361+P353, P304+P340, P305+P351+P338, P310, P321, P333+P313, P363, P391, P405, P501
Autoignition temperature	360 °C; 680 °F; 633 K

Related compounds
Related compounds	Tetraethylenepentamine TEPA; Triethylenetetramine TETA
- Except where otherwise noted, data are given for materials in their standard state (at 25 °C [77 °F], 100 kPa). Infobox references

Pentaethylenehexamine (abbreviated PEHA) is an organic amine. It is composed of five ethylene groups -CH_{2}CH_{2}- joined together in a chain by four secondary amine groups (-NH-) and terminated on each end by primary amine groups (-NH_{2}). Pentaethylenehexamine is a hexadentate ligand, owing to the Lewis basicity of the six amine groups. Pentaethylenehexamine is in the category of polyethyleneamines and is part of mixtures of these sold commercially.

Commercial supplies of pentaethylenehexamine contain, in addition to the linear form, branched and cyclic polyamines. As an amine, it is an organic base and can form ammonium salts by reaction with various acids. Salts with counter-anions such as chloride, sulfate, nitrate, naphthalene-2-sulfonate, and tosylate. Tosylate salts can be used to separate the linear molecule from the other forms, as it is less soluble.

== Properties ==
The infrared spectrum of pentaethylenehexamine salts show characteristics of the ammonium present. It has stretching modes, asymmetric and symmetric bending modes, but most useful absorption bands are due to rocking mode, where -NH_{3}^{+} is at 810 cm^{−1} and -NH_{2}^{+}- is at 768 cm^{−1}.

== Reactions ==
Pentaethylenehexamine undergoes an Eschweiler–Clarke reaction with formaldehyde and formic acid to substitute all of the amine hydrogen atoms with methyl groups, giving octamethylpentaethylenehexamine (OMPEHA).

Pentaethylenehexamine can rearrange to form N,N′-bis(2-aminoethyl)piperazine-1,4-diethylamine.

== Ligand ==
As a ligand pentaethylenehexamine is abbreviated peha or PEHA. It is a strong field ligand. It can coordinate cobalt, nickel, copper, zinc, cadmium lanthanum, neodymium, europium, samarium, lead, thorium, or uranium.

== Use ==
Pentaethylenehexamine is used in ion exchange resins, eg Lewatit 6718 HLH.

Pentaethylenehexamine has been investigated as a component in carbon dioxide capture, including direct from the air for conversion to methanol.
