= Gallate =

Gallate may refer to:

- gallic acid salt, a salt or ester of gallic acid
- gallium salt, a salt containing oxyanions of gallium
