= Aminoethylpiperazine =

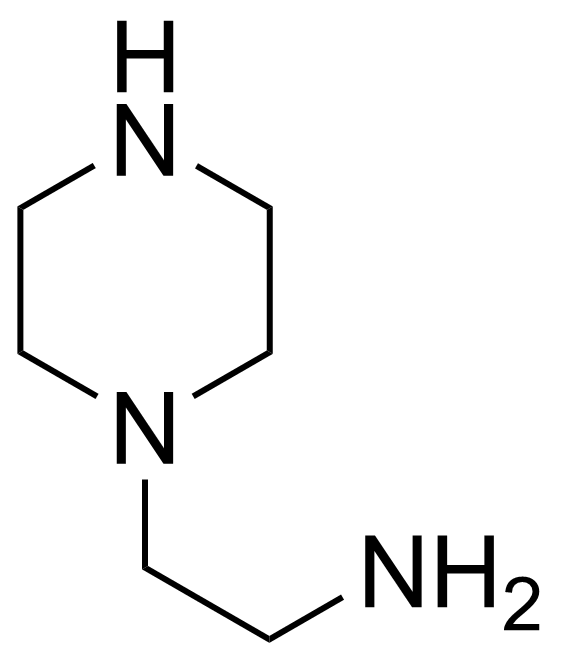

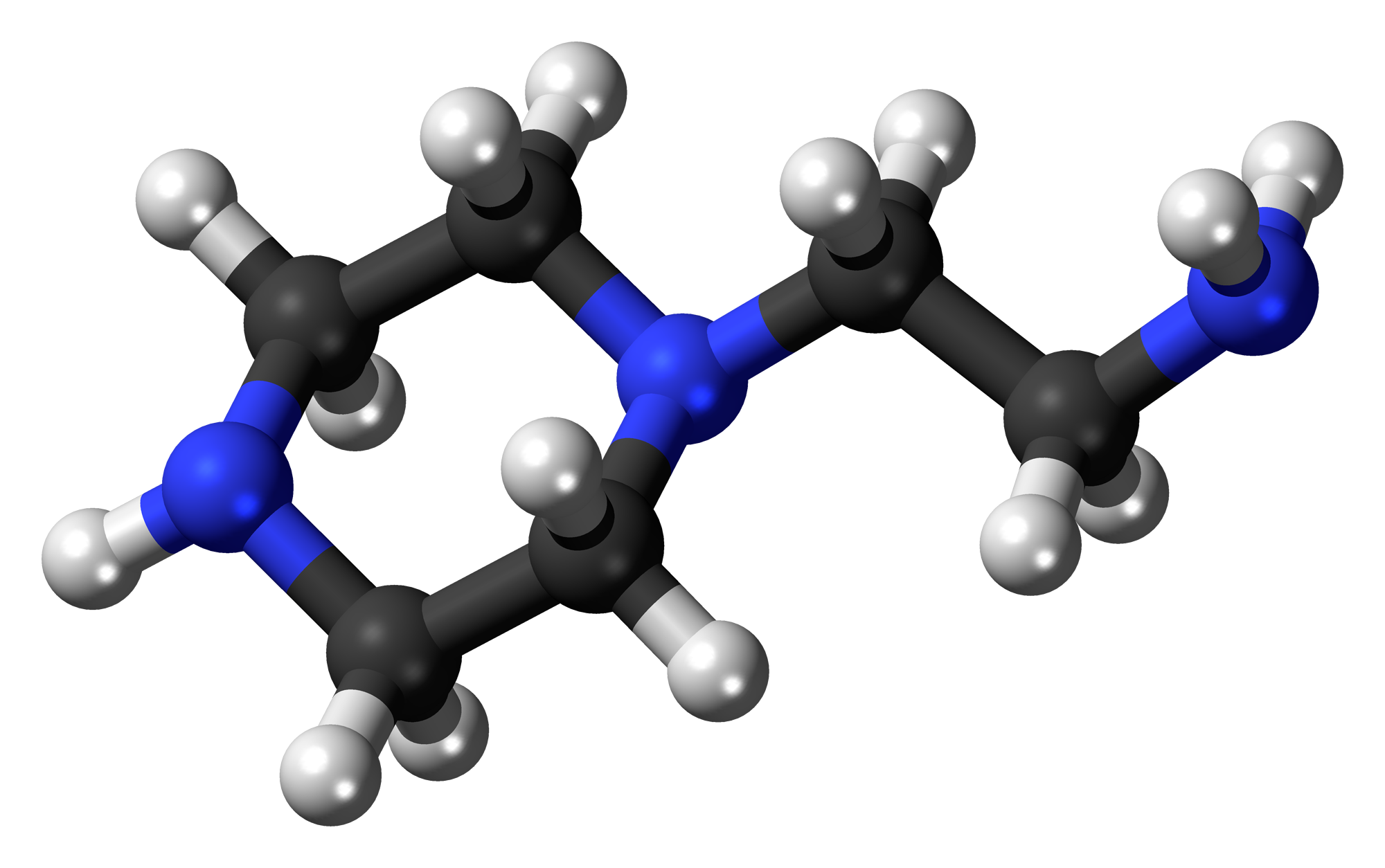

Names
- Preferred IUPAC name 2-(Piperazin-1-yl)ethan-1-amine
- Other names 2-(1-Piperazinyl)ethylamine, AEP, N-AEP, N-(2-Aminoethyl)piperazine, 2-Piperazinoethylamine, 1-(2-Aminoethyl)piperazine, 1-Piperazine ethanamine, 1-Aminoethylpiperazine

Identifiers
CAS Number	140-31-8
3D model (JSmol)	Interactive image
ChEMBL	ChEMBL209790
ChemSpider	8465
ECHA InfoCard	100.004.920
EC Number	205-411-0
PubChem CID	8795
RTECS number	TK8050000
UNII	I86052F9F6
UN number	2815
CompTox Dashboard (EPA)	DTXSID2021997
- InChI: InChI=1S/C6H15N3/c7-1-4-9-5-2-8-3-6-9/h8H,1-7H2 Key: IMUDHTPIFIBORV-UHFFFAOYSA-N; InChI=1/C6H15N3/c7-1-4-9-5-2-8-3-6-9/h8H,1-7H2 Key: IMUDHTPIFIBORV-UHFFFAOYAV
- SMILES: NCCN1CCNCC1

Properties
Chemical formula	C_{6}H_{15}N_{3}
Molar mass	129.207 g·mol^{−1}
Appearance	Colourless to yellowish liquid
Density	0.984 g/cm^{3} at 20 °C
Melting point	−19 °C (−2 °F; 254 K)
Boiling point	222 °C (432 °F; 495 K)
Solubility in water	miscible
Vapor pressure	0.076 mmHg @ 20 °C

Hazards
- Occupational safety and health (OHS/OSH)
Main hazards	harmful, corrosive, sensitizing
- GHS labelling
Pictograms	(GHS05: Corrosive) (GHS07: Exclamation mark)
Signal word	Danger
Hazard statements	H302, H312, H314, H317, H412
Precautionary statements	P260, P264, P270, P272, P273, P280, P301+P312, P301+P330+P331, P302+P352, P303+P361+P353, P304+P340, P305+P351+P338, P310, P312, P321, P322, P330, P333+P313, P363, P405, P501
NFPA 704 (fire diamond)	2 2 0
Flash point	93 °C (199 °F; 366 K)
Autoignition temperature	315 °C (599 °F; 588 K)
- Except where otherwise noted, data are given for materials in their standard state (at 25 °C [77 °F], 100 kPa). verify (what is ?) Infobox references

Aminoethylpiperazine (AEP) is a derivative of piperazine. This ethyleneamine contains three nitrogen atoms; one primary, one secondary and one tertiary. It is a corrosive organic liquid and can cause second or third degree burns. Aminoethylpiperazine can also cause pulmonary edema as a result of inhalation. It is REACH and TSCA registered.

== Production ==
Ethylene dichloride is reacted with ammonia as a main method of production. This process produces various ethylene amines which can then be purified by distillation. These include ethylenediamine, diethylenetriamine, triethylenetetramine, tetraethylenepentamine, other higher homologues and aminoethyl piperazine. AEP is also manufactured by reacting ethylenediamine or ethanolamine/ammonia mixtures over a catalyst.

== Epoxy resin curing agent ==
A key use of AEP is as an epoxy curing agent. When used as an epoxy resin curing agent, it is usually used in conjunction with other amines as an accelerator as it only has 3 amine hydrogens for cross-linking. The tertiary amine on the molecule acts as an accelerator and the other three amine hydrogens allow sites for crosslinking the epoxy. This then allows coating systems to be formulated that prevent corrosion of steel and other substrates. Novolac resins may also be cured by this material and blends.

== Other uses ==
Uses include inhibition of corrosion, surface activation, and as an asphalt additive. As AEP is alkaline and carbon dioxide is weakly acidic, it has been researched as a carbon dioxide sequestrant. This is part of ongoing research in Carbon capture and storage.

== Toxicology ==
The toxicology has been extensively studied and is well understood.

== See also ==
- Piperazine
