= Prepolymer =

Monomer material which can undergo further polymerization

In polymer chemistry, the term prepolymer or pre-polymer, refers to a monomer or system of monomers that have been reacted to an intermediate-molecular mass state. This material is capable of further polymerization by reactive groups to a fully cured, high-molecular-mass state. As such, mixtures of reactive polymers with un-reacted monomers may also be referred to as pre-polymers. The term "pre-polymer" and "polymer precursor" may be interchanged.

== Polyurethane and polyurea prepolymers ==
In polyurethane chemistry, prepolymers and oligomers are frequently produced and then further formulated into CASE applications - Coatings, Adhesives, Sealants, and Elastomers. An isocyanate (usually a diisocyanate) is reacted with a polyol. All types of polyol may in theory be used to produce polyurethane prepolymers. These then find use in CASE applications. When polyurethane dispersions are synthesized, a prepolymer is first produced usually modified with DMPA. In polyurea prepolymer production, instead of a polyol a polyamine is used.

== Lactic acid as a polymer precursor ==
Two molecules of lactic acid can be dehydrated to the cyclic molecule lactide, a lactone. A variety of catalysts can polymerise lactide to either heterotactic or syndiotactic polylactide, which as biodegradable polyesters with valuable (inter alia) medical properties are currently attracting much attention.

Nowadays, lactic acid is used as a monomer for producing polylactic acid (PLA) which later has application as biodegradable plastic. This kind of plastic is a good option for substituting conventional plastic produced from petrochemicals because of low emission of carbon dioxide. The commonly used process in producing lactic acid is via fermentation; to obtain the polylactic acid, the polymerization process follows.

== See also ==
- Synthetic resin
- Resin
