= Tetraethylenepentamine =

Names
- Preferred IUPAC name N^{1}-(2-Aminoethyl)-N^{2}-{2-[(2-aminoethyl)amino]ethyl}ethane-1,2-diamine

Identifiers
CAS Number	112-57-2
3D model (JSmol)	Interactive image
Beilstein Reference	506966
ChEBI	CHEBI:49798
ChEMBL	ChEMBL138297
ChemSpider	7905
ECHA InfoCard	100.003.624
EC Number	203-986-2
Gmelin Reference	51196
KEGG	C14690
PubChem CID	8197
RTECS number	KH8585000
UNII	YZD1C9KQ28
UN number	2320
CompTox Dashboard (EPA)	DTXSID7026108
- InChI: InChI=1S/C8H23N5/c9-1-3-11-5-7-13-8-6-12-4-2-10/h11-13H,1-10H2 Key: FAGUFWYHJQFNRV-UHFFFAOYSA-N
- SMILES: C(CNCCNCCNCCN)N

Properties
Chemical formula	C_{8}H_{23}N_{5}
Molar mass	189.307 g·mol^{−1}

Hazards
- GHS labelling
Pictograms	(GHS05: Corrosive) (GHS07: Exclamation mark) (GHS09: Environmental hazard)
Signal word	Danger
Hazard statements	H302, H312, H314, H317, H411
Precautionary statements	P260, P264, P270, P272, P273, P280, P301+P312, P301+P330+P331, P302+P352, P303+P361+P353, P304+P340, P305+P351+P338, P310, P312, P321, P322, P330, P333+P313, P363, P391, P405, P501

Related compounds
Related compounds	Pentaethylenehexamine; Triethylenetetramine
- Except where otherwise noted, data are given for materials in their standard state (at 25 °C [77 °F], 100 kPa). Infobox references

Tetraethylenepentamine (TEPA) is an organic compound and is in the class of chemicals known as ethyleneamines. It is a slightly viscous liquid and is not colorless but, like many amines, has a yellow color. It is soluble in most polar solvents. Diethylenetriamine (DETA), triethylenetetramine (TETA), piperazine, and aminoethylpiperazine are also usually present in commercially available TEPA.

== Uses ==
The reactivity and uses of TEPA are similar to those for the related ethylene amines ethylenediamine and diethylenetriamine and triethylenetetramine. It is primarily used as a curing agent or hardener in epoxy chemistry. This can be on its own or reacted with tall oil fatty acid (TOFA) and its dimer to make an amidoamine. This amidoamine is then used as the curing agent for epoxy resin systems. TEPA is a pentadentate ligand in coordination chemistry.
