= Waterborne resin =

Type of water-resistant material from plants

Waterborne resins, or water-based resins, are resins, including or polymeric resins, that use water as the carrying medium, as opposed to those used with other solvents or with none. Resins are used in the production of coatings, adhesives, sealants, elastomers and composite materials. Waterborne resin usually describes all resins for which water is the main carrier. They could be water-soluble, water reducible or water dispersed.

== History ==
Most coatings have four basic components. These are the resin, solvent, pigment and additive systems but the resin, or binder, is the key ingredient. Continuing environmental legislation in many countries along with geopolitics such as oil production are ensuring that chemists are increasingly turning to waterborne technology for paint/coatings and since resins or binders are the most important part of a coating, more of them are being developed and designed waterborne and there is a constantly increasing use by coating formulators. The use of waterborne coatings and hence waterborne resins really started to grow in the 1960s led by the United States and was driven by: a) the need to reduce flammability; b) environmental legislation aimed at reducing the amount of solvent vapor (volatile organic compounds, VOCs) discharged into the atmosphere; c) cost; d) political factors i.e. security of supply. All these factors helped the desire to reduce the reliance on oil derived solvents. The use of water as the carrying solvent for coatings and hence resins has been increasing ever since. The same holds true for adhesives. Water is generally a low cost (but not free) commodity in plentiful supply with no toxicity problems so there has always been a desire to produce paints, inks, adhesives and textile sizes etc. with water as the carrying solvent. This has required the production of waterborne resins designed for these systems. In recent years legislative pressure has ensured that waterborne systems and hence waterborne resins are coming increasingly to the fore.

== Types of waterborne resins ==
=== Waterborne epoxy resins ===
An epoxy resin system generally consists of a curing agent and an epoxy resin. Both the curing agent and the epoxy resin can be made waterborne. Solid epoxy resin (molecular weight >1000) dispersions are available and consist of an epoxy resin dispersed in water sometimes with the aid of co-solvents and surfactants. The resin backbone is often modified to ensure water dispersibility. These resins dry in their own right by water/co-solvent evaporation and the particles coalescence. To cure the resin and crosslink it, an amine-based curing agent is usually added. This produces a two-component system. An alternative is to use standard medium viscosity liquid epoxy resins and emulsify them in a water-soluble polyamine or polyaminoamide hardener resin which also gives a two-component system. Polyaminoamides (or polyamidoamines) are made by reacting ethylene amines with dimerized fatty acids to give a species with amide links but still having amine functionality. Water is liberated during the condensation reaction. These resins can then be made water-soluble by reacting further with glacial organic acids or formaldehyde. Resins like these are usually left with yet further amine functionality on the polymer backbone to enable them to cure and crosslink an epoxy resin. Paints may then be made from them by pigmenting either the epoxy or the amine hardener portion or even both. Polyamine curing resins as opposed to polyaminoamide resins are generally made by partially adducting polyfunctional amines with an epoxy resin and/or epoxy diluent and leaving the species with residual amine functionality. This adduct can then be dissolved in water and used to emulsify more epoxy resin and again either portion or both may be pigmented. The advantage with these systems is that they do not need glacial organic acids to solubilize them. This is an advantage if the coating is to be used over a highly alkaline substrate such as fresh concrete, as the alkali from the cement will neutralise the acid and cause instability on repeated dipping of a brush into the can. Even though water is present and is a fuel for corrosion, water-based metal coatings based on waterborne epoxy can also be formulated. Other research is investigating the benefits of combining graphene technology with waterborne epoxy.

Research continues and many patents and journal papers continue to be published with novel ways of converting epoxy systems to their waterborne counterparts. One such method is to take a molecule that already is intrinsically partially hydrophilic such as a diol with a polypropylene oxide backbone, and then reacting it with epichlorohydrin and then dehydrochlorinated with sodium hydroxide. This produces a diepoxy terminated polypropylene glycol molecule. This can now be reacted with an ethyleneamine such as triethylenetetramine (TETA) to produce an amine terminated moiety that is intrinsically hydrophilic and able to cure an epoxy resin. These waterbased epoxy coatings when used with the right choice of pigments, can be used to coat the inside of oil tanks.

=== Waterborne alkyd resins ===
Water reducible alkyds are basically conventional alkyd resins (i.e., polyesters based on saturated or unsaturated oils or fatty acids, polybasic acids and alcohols) modified to confer water miscibility. Typical components are vegetable oils or fatty acids such as linseed, soybean, castor, dehydrated castor, safflower, tung, coconut and tall oil. Acids include isophthalic, terephthalic, adipic, benzoic, succinic acids and phthalic, maleic and trimellitic anhydride. Polyols include glycerol, pentaerythritol, trimethylolpropane, ethylene glycol, propylene glycol, diethylene glycol, neopentyl glycol, 1,6-hexanediol and 1,4-butanediol. Typical methods for introducing varying degrees of water miscibility are similar to other resin systems. Methods basically involve introducing hydrophilic centres such as acid groups that can then be neutralised to form a salt. Introducing polar groups onto the backbone is another method. With alkyds typical methods include maleinazation of unsaturated fatty acids with maleic anhydride. This involves making a Diels-Alder adduct near the double bond sites. The acid groups introduced can then be further reacted with polyols. A Diels-Alder reaction only occurs where there is a conjugated double bond system. Simple addition occurs if not conjugated. Other techniques include synthesizing the resin with hydroxyl functional oligomers e.g. containing ethylene glycol then adding specific acid or hydroxyl containing substances towards the end of the reaction. Another technique is making an acrylic functional alkyd with an acrylic monomer blend rich in carboxylic acid groups. Synthesis techniques have been studied and published for acrylic modified water-reducible alkyds.

==== Alkyd emulsions ====
Late twentieth century technology allowed the production of alkyd emulsions. The technology continues to evolve including production of direct-to-metal (DTM) finishes. The biggest issue has been getting VOC content below 250 g/L. Poor corrosion resistance has also been an issue. Alkyd emulsion technology uses a reactive surfactant that has double bonds and thus oxidative drying properties like a conventional alkyd. The material is then put under shear and water added slowly. Initially a water in oil emulsion is formed but continued water addition and shear results in inversion and a stable oil in water emulsion is formed. Sustainability and other market factors mean a number of companies are entering the market. As well as patents, doctoral theses are being done at universities on the subject.

=== Waterborne polyester resins ===
Saturated polyester resins contain many of the materials used in conventional alkyd resins but without the oil or fatty acid components. Typical components for these resins are poly carboxylic and polyhydroxyl components. The more commonly used polyacids are phthalic, isophthalic, terephthalic and adipic acid. Phthalic and trimellitic anhydrides may also be used. Polyols tend to be neopentyl glycol, 1,6-hexanediol and trimethylolpropane. To make them waterborne organic acids or anhydrides are added in a two-stage process but there are other methods too.

=== Waterborne polyurethane resins ===
Polyurethane resins are available waterborne. The single component versions are usually referred to as polyurethane dispersions (PUD). They are available in anionic, cationic and nonionic versions though anionic moieties are the most readily available commercially. The use of an anionic or cationic center or indeed a hydrophilic non-ionic manufacturing technique tends to result in a permanent inbuilt water resistance weakness. Research is being conducted and techniques developed to combat this weakness. Cationic PUD also introduce hydrophilic components when synthesized, but techniques have and are being researched to improve the performance and water resistance properties by various techniques. This includes introducing star-branched polydimethylsiloxane.

Waterborne polyurethanes are also available in two-component versions. As a two-component polyurethane consists of polyol(s) and an isocyanate and isocyanates react with water this requires special formulating and production techniques. The polyisocyanate that is water-dispersible maybe modified with sulfonate for example. PUDs are not usually synthesised with plant based polyols because they don't have other performance enhancing functional groups. Recent work (2021) reports modification to achieve this and enable even greener versions. Work is also ongoing to get the performance of one-component waterborne polyurethanes to match that of two-component versions. Self-healing versions of two-component waterborne polyurethanes are being researched. Research has shown that modification of these resin systems with polyaniline improves a number of properties including corrosion resistance. Higher solid content is also desired for economics of not transporting water.

Ionic centers are usually introduced with waterborne PUDs, and so the water resistance in the resultant film has been studied. The nature of the polyol and the level of COOH groups and hydrophobic modification with other moieties can improve the hydrophilicity. Polyester polyols give the biggest improvements. Polycarbonate polyols also enhance properties, especially if the polycarbonate is also fluorinated.

Silicone modification of the resin makes the species much more hydrophobic and water resistant.

As the world attempts to move towards a low-carbon economy, carbon capture by using carbon dioxide from the atmosphere is gaining attention and research being done. Using carbon dioxide in PUD production is being researched.

=== Waterborne Latexes ===
A latex is a stable dispersion (emulsion) of polymer in water. Synthetic lattices are usually made by polymerizing a monomer such as vinyl acetate that has been emulsified with surfactants dispersed in water. The overall technique is called emulsion polymerization. Other techniques including inversion from water in oil to oil in water emulsions are available. Particular emphasis in recent years has been the production of self-crosslinking versions especially acrylic emulsions. As an example, these may be produced by modifying with divinyl silane. Some examples include vinyl acetate based latices, acrylics and styrene-butadiene versions. They may be used to produce waterborne direct to metal coatings. Waterborne acrylic resins are also used frequently in water-based paints.

Acrylic latices prepared by emulsion polymerization are often improved by copolymerizing other functional monomers. Glycidyl methacrylate is one such monomer used which then incorporates oxirane functionality into the polymer. This would then improve the properties (such as scrub resistance) of the paint formulated from this resin. DMAEMA (dimethylaminoethyl methacrylate) is another such species. Other innovative techniques for improving acrylic latices include incorporating a biocide with acrylic functionality as the modifying monomer. This allows the binder for a waterborne paint to be inherently anti-biocidal. Techniques exist to speed up the cure of waterborne acrylics. Waterborne acrylic latices and polyurethane acrylates that are UV curable have also been produced.

IUPAC definition of emulsion polymerization

Emulsion polymerization: Polymerization whereby monomer(s), initiator, dispersion
medium, and possibly colloid stabilizer constitute initially an inhomogeneous system
resulting in particles of colloidal dimensions containing the formed polymer.

Note: With the exception of mini-emulsion polymerization, the term "emulsion polymerization"
does not mean that polymerization occurs in the droplets of a monomer emulsion.

Batch emulsion polymerization: Emulsion polymerization in which all the ingredients are
placed in a reactor prior to reaction.

Polymeric and oligomeric aziridines are one of the moieties used to crosslink waterborne resins. They usually react with the carboxyl groups present on these species. Potlife is usually improved along with other properties.

=== Waterborne electrophoretic deposition resins ===
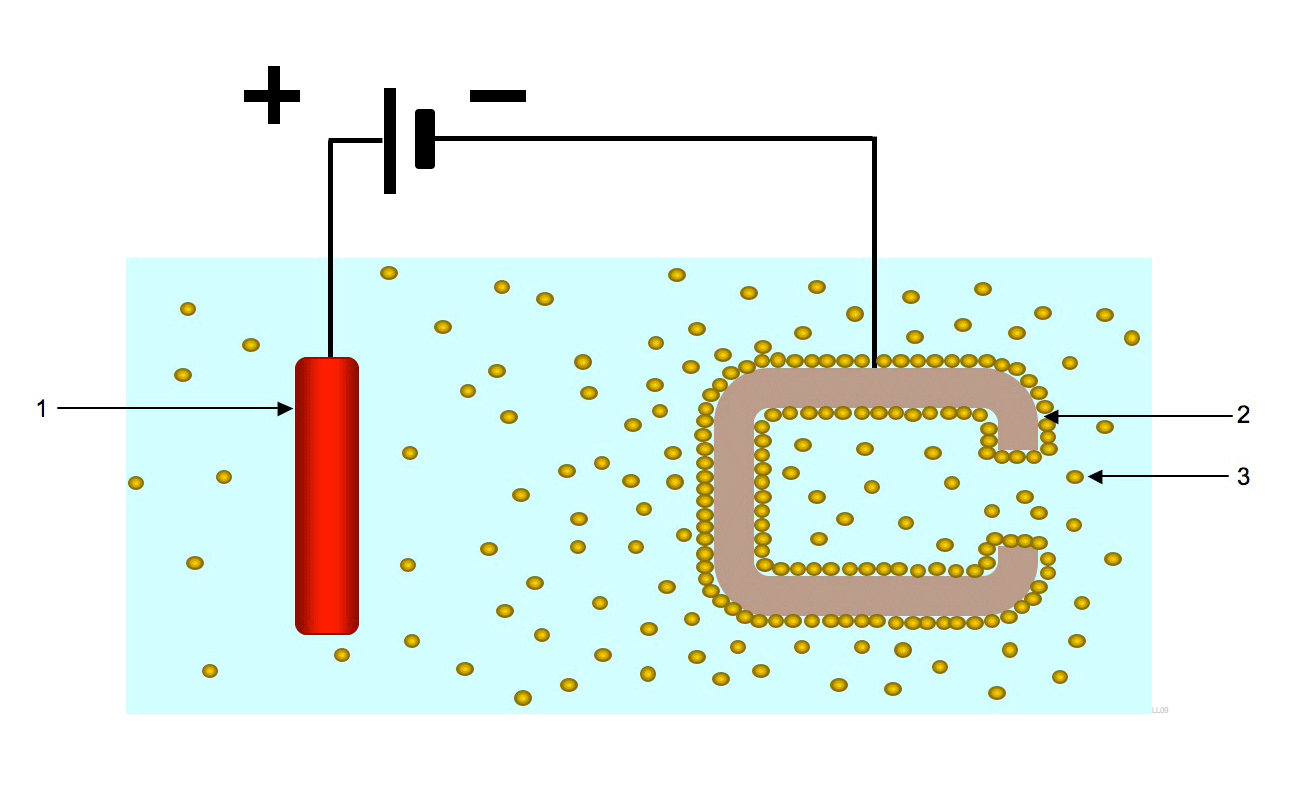
Electrophoretic deposition process

The resins used for electrodeposition are usually epoxy, acrylic or phenolic resin types. They are formulated with functional groups which when neutralised form ionic groups on the polymer backbone. These confer water solubility on the polymer. They are available as anodic versions, which deposit on the cathode of an electrochemical cell, or cathodic, which deposit on the cathode. Cathodic electrodeposition resins dominate and they have revolutionised corrosion protection in the automotive industry. Ceramics as well as metals may be coated this way. They are applied as original equipment manufacture (OEM) rather than as a refinishing system. Cathodic resins contain amines on the polymer backbone which are neutralized by acids groups, such as acetic acid, to give a stable aqueous dispersion. When an electric current is passed through a car body that is dipped in a bath containing a paint based on a cathodic electrodeposition resin, the hydroxyl ions formed near the cathode deposit the paint on the car body. The electric current needed for this is determined by the number of ionic centers. Dispersions of waterborne resins for electrocoating usually contain some co-solvents, such as butyl glycol and isopropanol, and are usually very low in solids content, i.e. 15%. They usually have molecular weights in the region of 3000–4000. Paints based on them tend to have PVCs of less than 10, i.e. a very high binder to pigment ratio.

Cathodic electrophoretic deposition coatings can be made that are self-healing even at room temperature. The base polymer used for this synthesis is a waterborne polyurethane dispersion (PUD) that is cationic rather than anionic.

=== Waterborne hybrid resins ===
Many resins are available waterborne but can be hybrids or blends. An example would be polyurethane dispersions blended or hybridized with acrylic resins, which are commonly used in automotive paint. Such systems can be made by using acrylic monomers and a polyurethane dispersion which will polymerise simultaneously to give an interpenetrating polymer network, without the need for NMP as a cosolvent. This combines the lower cost of acrylic with the high performance of a polyurethane. Waterborne epoxy resins may be modified with acrylate and then further modified with side chains having many fluorine atoms on them. Waterborne resins are also available that use both water and renewable raw materials. Another example is to combine alkyd resins with acrylics to make them waterborne. Using hyperbranched alkyds and modifying them with acrylic monomers and using mini emulsion polymerization, suitable hybrids maybe formed. As well as hybridization of the resins, a combination of techniques maybe employed. As an example, ultraviolet curing coatings that can be electrodeposited and are waterborne hybrids of epoxy and acrylic resins maybe produced.

Hybrid resins include, among others, PUDs that are both waterborne and UV-curable. They are being researched and many papers published. PUD acrylics using epoxidized soybean oil have been produced that are UV-curable. The structure and type of acrylate will affect the properties. Hybrid resins used in coatings that are vegetable based, waterborne and UV-curable are considered very green and have also been investigated. Similarly, UV-curable waterborne fluorinated polyurethane-acrylate resins can be designed and used in coatings. As well as acrylic PUD hybridization, further modification with silane monomers can be undertaken.

Other examples of hybridization include modifying waterborne epoxy with latex dispersions. The latex-modified epoxy aqueous dispersions are treated by evaporation techniques. Nitrile latices were used in the study.

Modification of soybean oil that has been epoxidized and then reacted with acrylic acid will produce waterborne epoxy acrylates that are also based on some renewable content. The corrosion resistance properties are improved using this technique.

Alkyds can likewise be hybridised and made water-reducible. This may be achieved by acrylic modification. Waterborne epoxy resins may also be acrylated and hybridized and much research has gone into these systems. Research is also taking place using waterborne alkyd resins hybridized with styrene-acrylic emulsions. These then find use in waterborne exterior decorative and architectural paints.

=== Waterborne resins with high bio-based or renewable content ===
High bio-based content or renewability of materials is highly prized as there is a trend in some parts of the world to a low-carbon economy. Waterborne resins are already perceived as environmentally friendly but work is ongoing to improve this further by using non-petroleum based raw materials where possible. Waterborne epoxies are one such area of research. Since waterborne resins are usually considered green and environmentally friendly, techniques are being researched that include capturing carbon dioxide from the atmosphere to make the raw materials and then further synthesis.

== Water ==
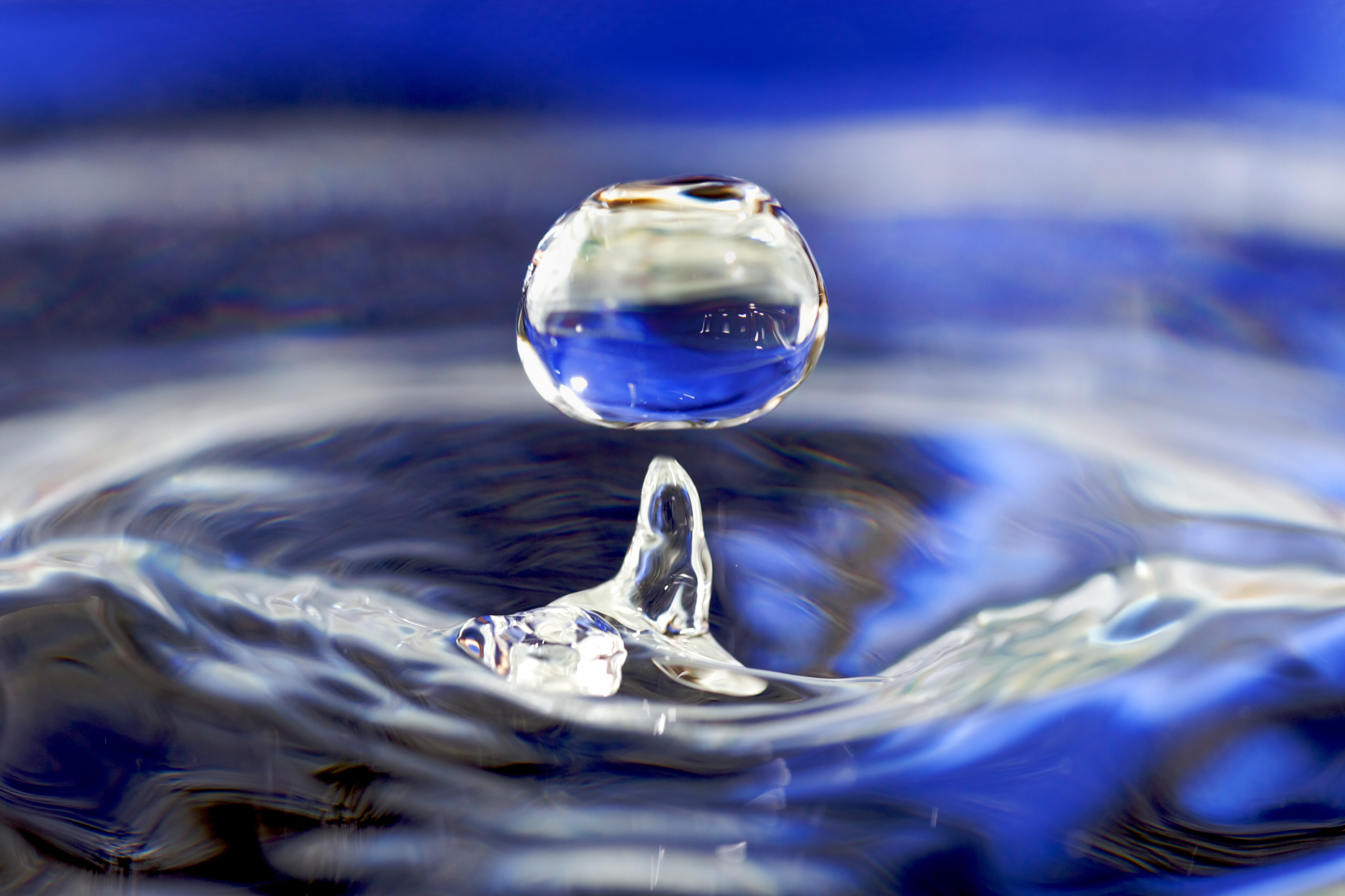
A globule of liquid water, and the depression and rebound in water caused by something dropping through the water surface

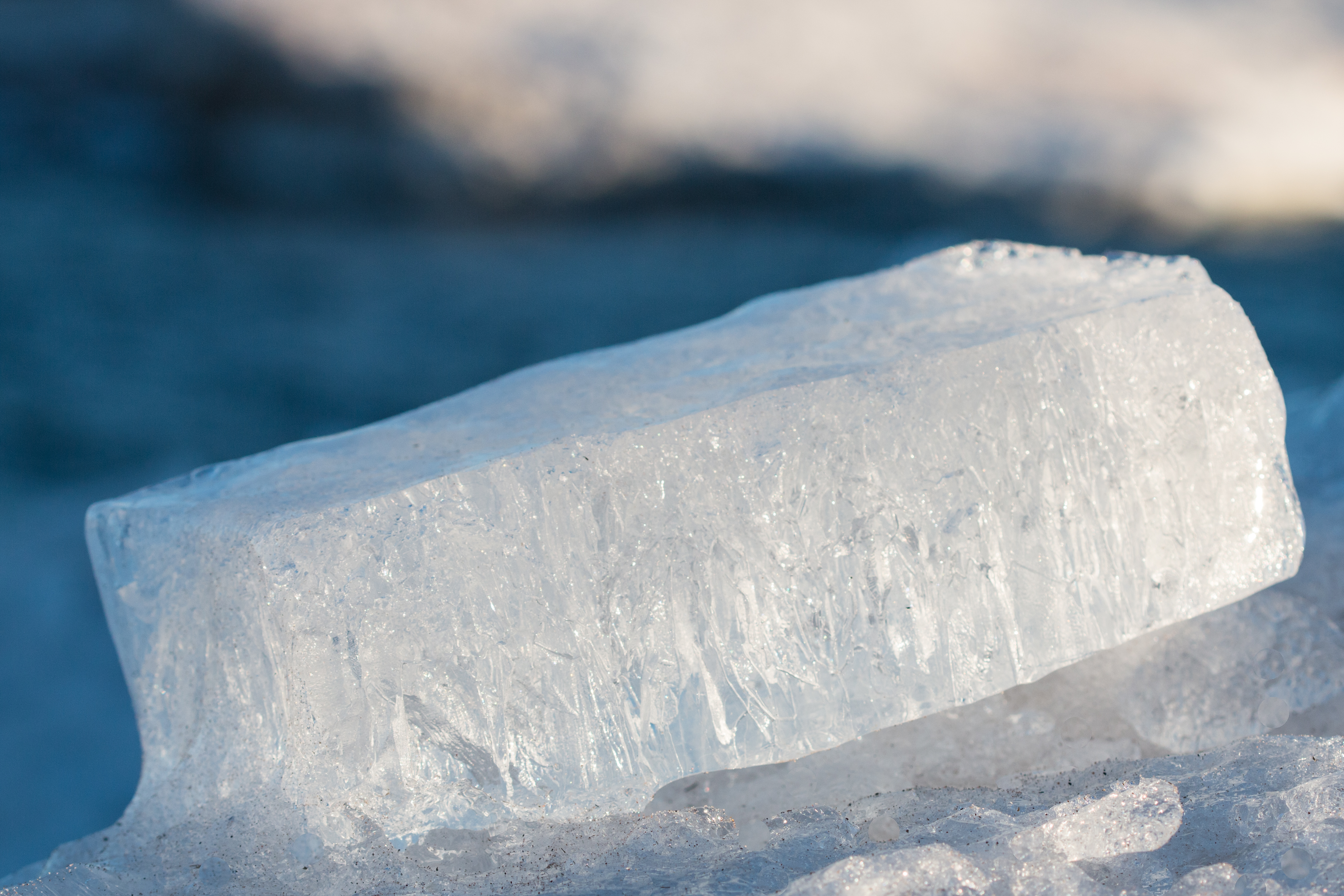
A block of solid water (ice)

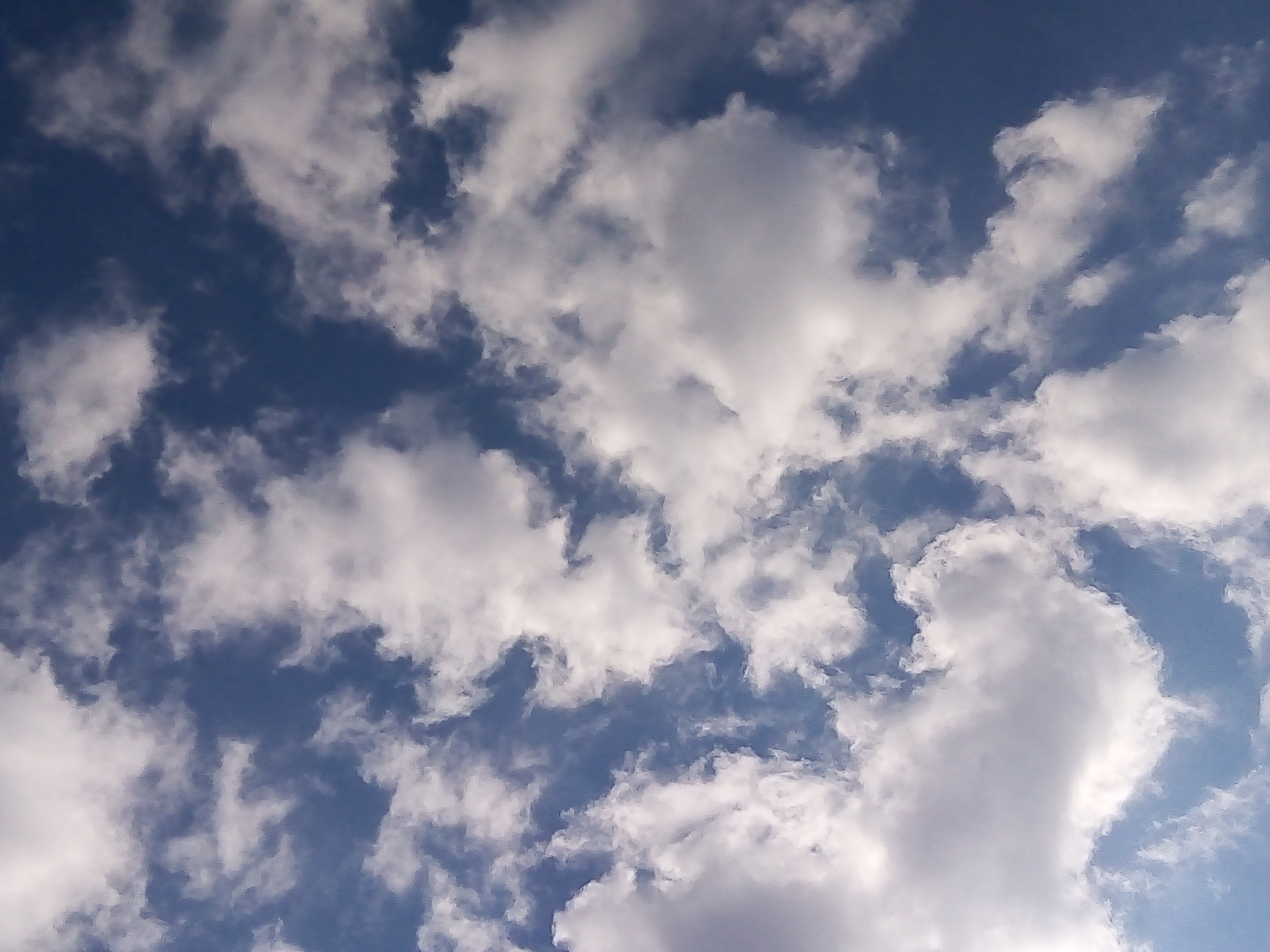
Clouds in Earth's atmosphere condense from gaseous water vapor.

Water is in some ways an unusual chemical. It is a very powerful and universal solvent. Most liquids decrease in volume on freezing, but water expands. It occurs naturally on earth in all three states of solid (ice), liquid (water) and gas(water vapour and steam). At 273.16 K or 0.16 °C (known as the triple point) it can coexist in all three states simultaneously. It has a very low molecular weight of 18 and yet a relatively high boiling point of 100 ^{0} C. This is due to inter molecular forces and in particular hydrogen bonding. The surface tension is also high at 72 dynes/cm (mN/metre) which affects its ability to wet certain surfaces. It evaporates (latent heat of evaporation 2260 kJ per kg) very slowly in comparison to some solvents and hardly at all when the relative humidity is very high. It has a very high specific heat capacity (4.184 kJ/kg/K ) and that is why it is used in central heating systems in the United Kingdom and Europe. These factors have to be borne in mind when formulating waterborne resins and other water based systems such as adhesives and coatings.

== Uses ==
Waterborne resins find use in Coatings, Adhesives, Sealants and Elastomers and other applications. Specifically they find use in textile coatings, industrial coatings, UV coatings, floor coatings, hygiene coatings, wood coatings, adhesives, concrete coatings, automotive coatings, clear coatings and anticorrosive applications including waterborne epoxy based anticorrosive primers They are also used in the design and manufacture of medical devices such as the polyurethane dressing, a liquid bandage based on polyurethane dispersion. Over the years they have also been used in polymer modified cements and repair mortars They have also found use in general textile applications including coating nonwovens. Recent (post 2020) innovations have included producing a waterborne polyurethane that has embedded silver particles to combat COVID. Waterborne polyurethane dispersions with antimicrobial properties have also been developed.

== See also ==
- Coatings
- Polymer science
- Prepolymer
- Synthetic resin
- Water
