= Polyurethane urea elastomer =

Synthetic material used for protection

The polyurethane urea elastomer (PUU), or poly (urethane urea) elastomer, is a flexible polymeric material that is composed of linkages made out of polyurethane and polyurea compounds. Due to its hyperelastic properties, it is capable of bouncing back high-speed ballistic projectiles as if the material had "hardened" upon impact. PUUs were developed by researchers from the U.S. Army Research Laboratory (ARL) and the Army's Institute for Soldier Nanotechnology at the Massachusetts Institute of Technology (MIT) to potentially replace polyethylene materials in body armor and other protective gear, such as combat helmets, face shields, and ballistic vests.

== Composition ==
In general, PUUs are composed of both hard and soft segments that each play a role in the material’s physical properties. The soft segments consist of two types of chemical compounds, long-chain polyols and diisocyanates, that react and connect together with urethane linkages. On the other hand, the short-chain diamines react with the diisocyanates to form the hard segments that are held together with urea linkages. The mechanical properties of the PUU largely depend on the specific diisocyanates, long-chain polyols, and short-chain diamines in play, because how these components interact determines how well the soft and hard segments of the elastomers both crystallize and undergo microphase separation. As a result, variations in this molecular arrangement of chemical compounds have been shown to greatly affect the elastomer’s morphology and the macroscopic, mechanical properties that it exhibits.

== Hyperelastic behavior ==
In 2017, researchers from the Army Research Laboratory and MIT reported that PUUs are capable of demonstrating hyperelastic properties, meaning that the material becomes extremely hardened upon being deformed within a very short time. As a result, the material may withstand ballistic impacts at exceptionally high speeds.

For the study, the researchers investigated the performance of different PUU variants where 4,4’-dicyclohexylmethane diisocyanate (HMDI) was chosen as the diisocyanate compound, diethyltoluenediamine (DETA) was chosen as the short-chain diamine compound, and poly(tetramethyleneoxide) (PTMO) was chosen as the long-chain polyol compound. Despite consisting of the same chemical compounds with the same stoichiometric ratio of 2:1:1 of [HDMI]:[DETA]:[PTMO], the samples differed regarding the molecular weight of their respective PTMO component, namely 650 g/mol (10,400 oz/lbmol), 1,000 g/mol (16,000 oz/lbmol), and 2,000 g/mol (32,000 oz/lbmol), for the soft segments of the elastomers.

Each of the three samples were subjected to a laser-induced projectile impact test (LIPIT), which tested the dynamic response of the material by using a pulsed laser to shoot it with microparticles made of silica at speeds ranging from 200 to 800 m/s (660 to 2,620 ft/s). The researchers found that the sample with the 650 g/mol (10,400 oz/lbmol) PTMO was the most rigid variant with the particle exhibiting a shallow penetration of about 4 μm (0.00016 in) upon impact despite travelling at 790 m/s (2,600 ft/s) before rebounding at 195 m/s (640 ft/s). In contrast, the sample with the 2,000 g/mol (32,000 oz/lbmol) PTMO displayed a deeper penetration of about 9 μm (0.00035 in), but had a slower particle rebound of 80 m/s (260 ft/s), making it the most rubber-like among the PUU samples. The strain-rates associated with these impacts were on the order of 2.0 x 10^8/s for the former and 8.1 x 10^7/s for the latter.

However, all three PUU variants demonstrated rebound capabilities with no signs of post-mortem damage after impact from the microparticles. In contrast, when the LIPIT was performed on a ductile, glassy polycarbonate at similar speeds to that of the 650 g/mol (10,400 oz/lbmol) PTMO PUU variant, the polycarbonate displayed predominant deformation upon impact, despite its high fracture toughness and ballistic strength. According to the researchers, the effectiveness of the PUUs may come from how the molecules “resonate” similar to chain-mail upon impact with each oscillations at specific frequencies dissipate the absorbed energy. In comparison, the polycarbonate lacked the broad range of relaxation times, a characteristic that reflects how efficiently the molecules in the polymer chains respond to an external impulse, that PUUs are known to have. As a result, the researchers concluded that even the most rubber-like variant of the PUU, specifically the 2,000 g/mol (32,000 oz/lbmol) PTMO sample, demonstrated greater robustness and dynamic stiffening than the glassy polycarbonate.

ARL researchers have stated that the PUU’s primary benefit comes not from its extra strength but its fabric-like flexibility, which demonstrates its potential as a replacement material for the rigid ceramic and metal plates generally found in military battle armor. However, as of 2018, the PUU is still under development in the testing phase.
