= Spandex =

Synthetic fibre known for its elasticity

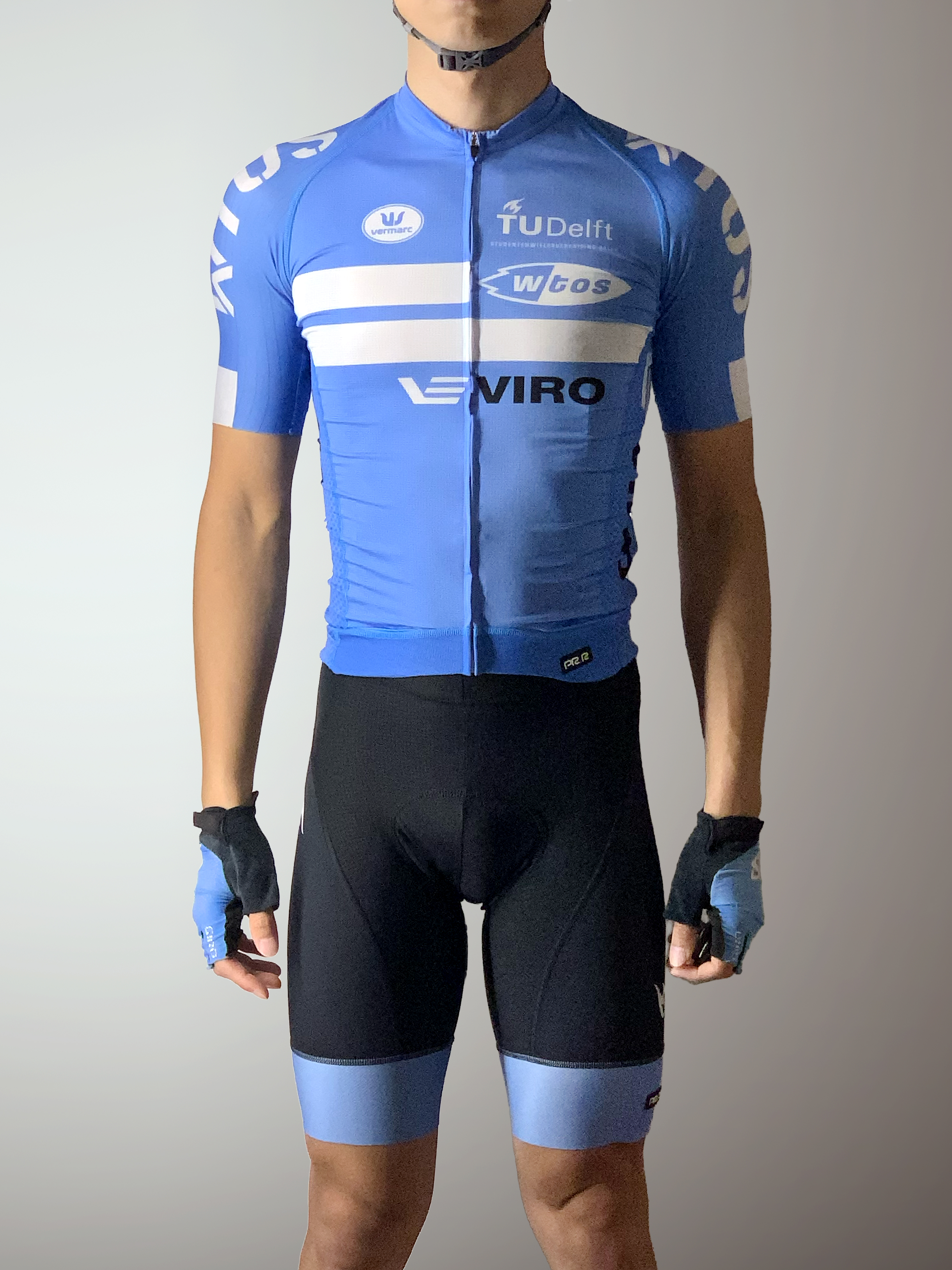
Elastic material used in the fabrics of a summer cycling attire comprising a jersey, bib shorts and gloves

Spandex, Lycra, or elastane is a synthetic fiber known for its exceptional elasticity. It is a polyether-polyurethane copolymer that was invented in 1958 by chemist Joseph Shivers at DuPont.

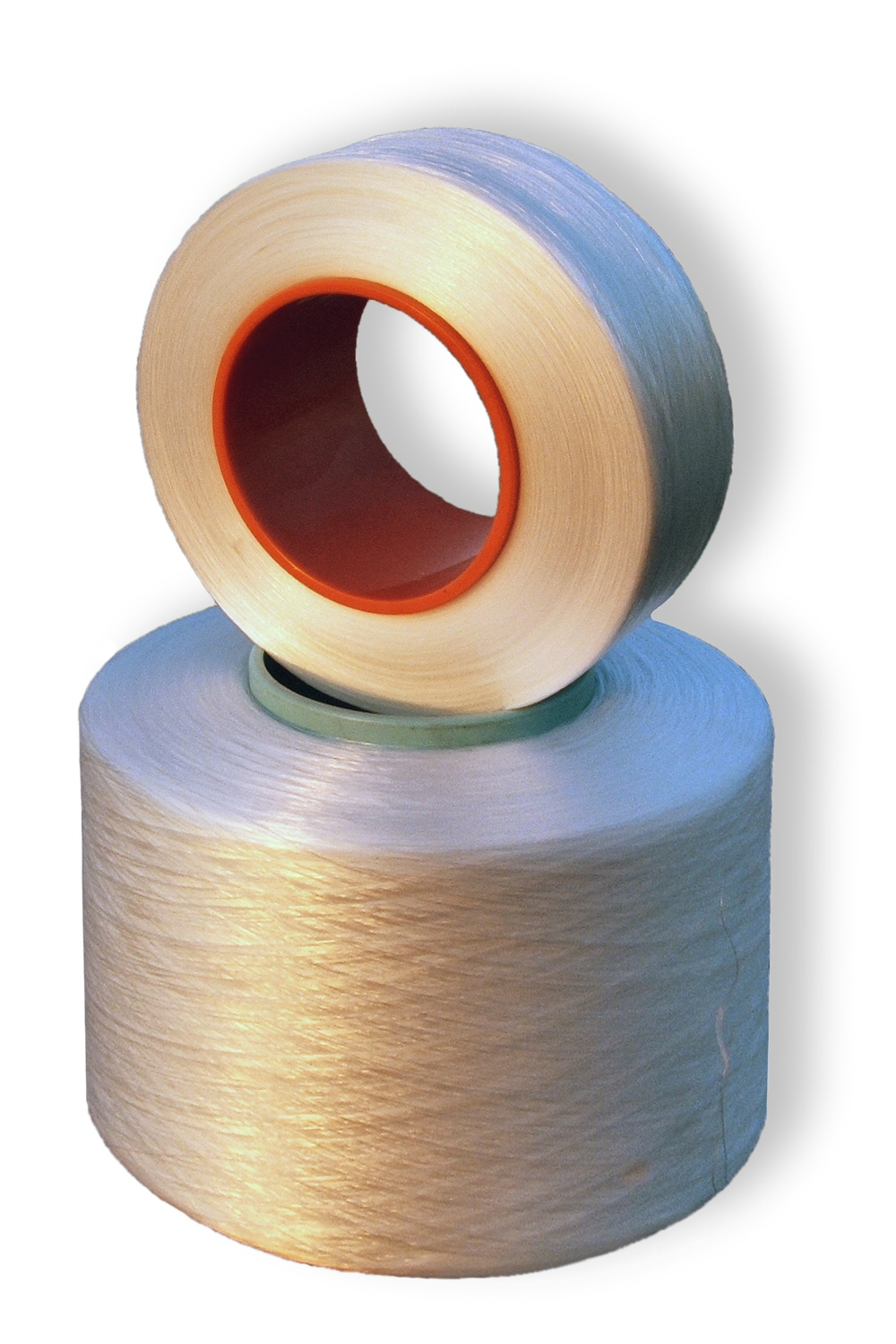
Colourless spandex yarn

== Name ==
The name spandex, which is an anagram of the word "expands", is the preferred name in North America. In continental Europe, it is referred to by variants of elastane. (Note: Including élasthanne (France), Elastan (Germany, Sweden), elastano (Spain), elastam (Italy), and elastaan (Netherlands)) It is primarily known as Lycra in the UK, Ireland, Portugal, Spain, Latin America, Australia, and New Zealand.

Brand names for spandex include Lycra (made by The Lycra Company, previously a division of DuPont Textiles and Interiors), Elaspan (The Lycra Company), Acepora (Taekwang Group), Creora (Hyosung), INVIYA (Indorama Corporation), ROICA and Dorlastan (Asahi Kasei), Linel (Fillattice), and ESPA (Toyobo).

== Production ==
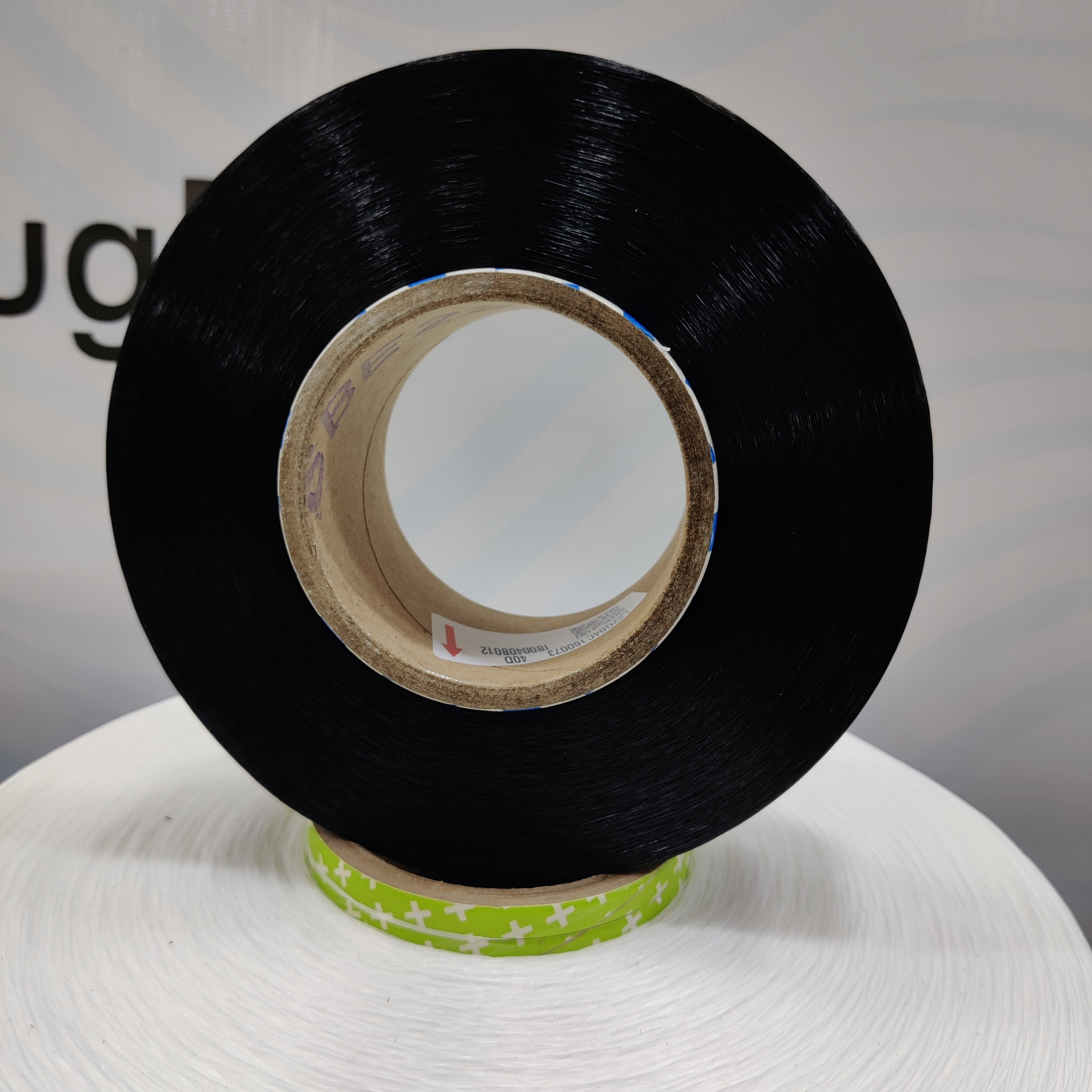
Black dyed spandex yarn

Unlike many other synthetic fibers, spandex cannot be melt-processed because the polymer degrades upon melting. Spandex fibers are produced by several spinning technologies. Typically, a concentrated solution of the polymer is drawn through spinnerets at temperatures where the solvent evaporates.

Chemical route to polyurethane polymer used in production of spandex

Spandex is mainly composed of a polyurethane derived from the reaction of a diol and a diisocyanate. Two classes of spandex are defined by the "macrodiols". One class of macrodiols is the oligomer produced from tetrahydrofuran (i.e. polytetrahydrofuran). Another class of diols, the so-called ester diols, are oligomers derived from condensation of adipic acid and glycols. Spandex produced from the ester diols is more resilient photochemically and to chlorinated water. Almost always, the diisocyanate is methylenebis(phenyl isocyanate). The key linking reaction is formation of the urethane (carbamate):

ROH + OCNR' → ROC(O)NHR

The polyurethane is usually treated with various diamines, which function as chain extenders.

== Function ==
The exceptional elasticity of spandex fibers increases the clothing's pressure comfort, enhancing the ease of body movements. Pressure comfort is the response towards clothing by the human body's pressure receptors (mechanoreceptors present in skin sensory cells). The sensation response is affected mainly by the stretch, snug, loose, heavy, lightweight, soft, and stiff structure of the material.

The elasticity and strength (stretching up to five times its length) of spandex has been incorporated into a wide range of garments, especially in skin-tight garments. A benefit of spandex is its significant strength and elasticity and its ability to return to the original shape after stretching and faster drying than ordinary fabrics. For clothing, spandex is usually mixed with cotton or polyester, and accounts for a small percentage of the final fabric, which therefore retains most of the look and feel of the other fibers. An estimated 80% of clothing sold in the United States contained spandex in 2010.

== Gallery ==
Stretch material used in various sports

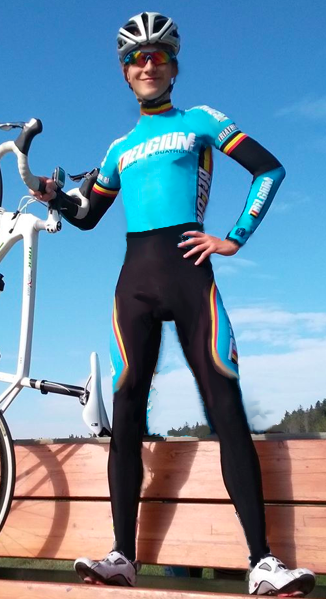
A road cyclist wearing compression garments

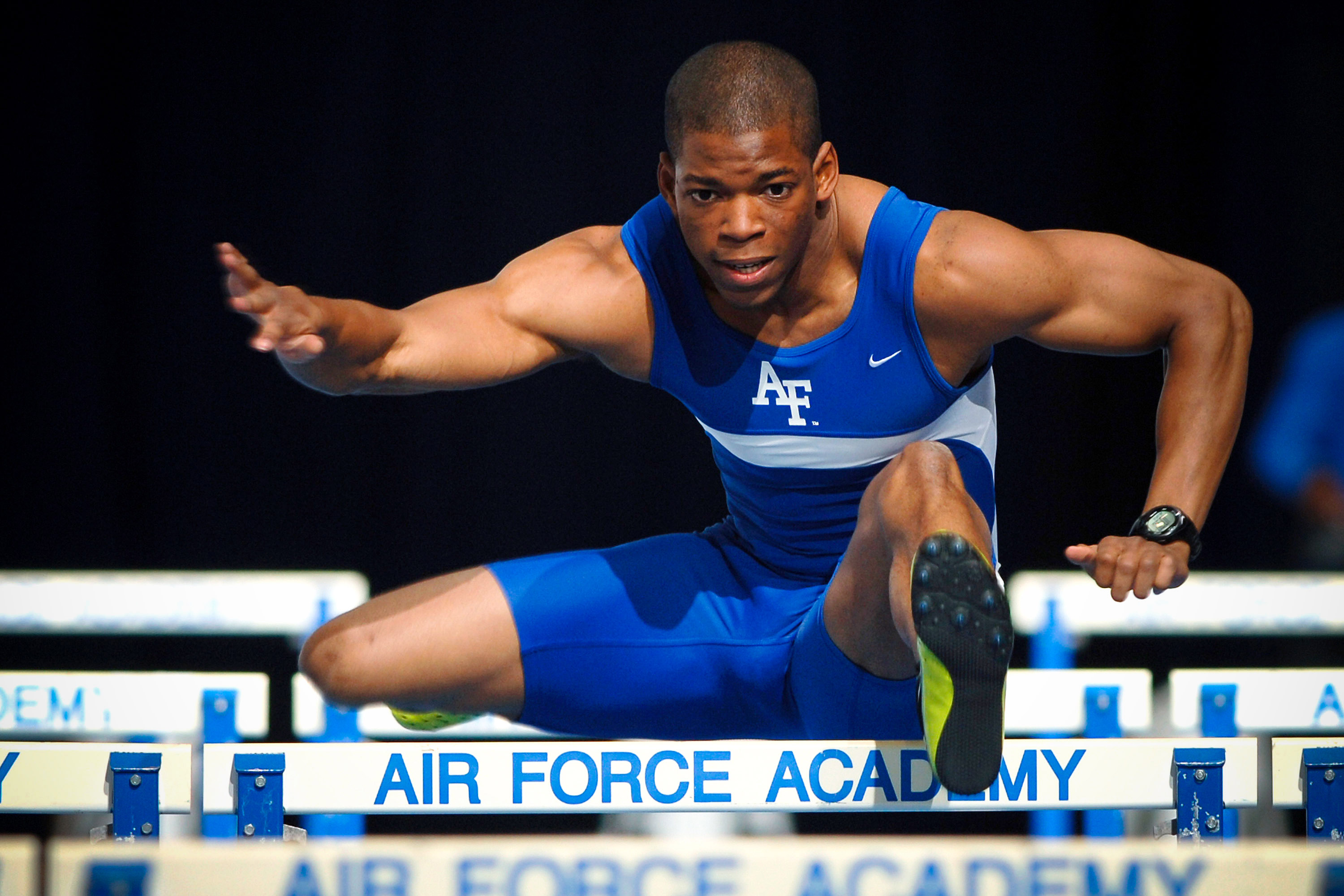
A United States Air Force Academy hurdler in a uniform

== History ==
The easy condensation of diols and diisocyanates was recognized in the 1930s as the result of work by Otto Bayer. Fibers suitable for replacing nylon were not created from urethanes, but instead this theme led to a family of specialized elastic fabrics.

In the post-World War II era, DuPont Textiles Fibers Department, formed in 1952, became the most profitable division of DuPont, dominating the synthetic fiber market worldwide. At this time, women began to emerge as a significant group of consumers because of their need for underwear and hosiery. After conducting market research to find out what women wanted from textiles, DuPont began developing fibers to meet such needs—including a better fiber for women's girdles, which were commonly made of rubber at the time.

In the early 1950s chemist Joseph C. Shivers modified Dacron polyester, producing an elastic fiber that could withstand high temperatures.

=== Lycra brand ===
To distinguish its brand of spandex fiber, DuPont chose the trade name Lycra (originally called Fiber K). DuPont launched an extensive publicity campaign for its Lycra brand, taking advertisements and full-page ads in top women's magazines. Audrey Hepburn helped catapult the brand on and off-screen during this time; models and actresses like Joan Collins and Ann-Margret followed Hepburn's aesthetic by posing in Lycra clothing for photo shoots and magazine covers.

By the mid-1970s, with the emergence of the women's liberation movement, girdle sales began to drop as they came to be associated with anti-independence and emblematic of an era that was quickly passing away. In response, DuPont marketed Lycra as the aerobic fitness movement emerged in the 1970s. The association of Lycra with fitness had been established at the 1968 Winter Olympic Games, when the French ski team wore Lycra garments. The fiber came to be especially popular in mid-thigh-length shorts worn by cyclists.

By the 1980s, the fitness trend had reached its height in popularity and fashionistas began wearing shorts on the street. Spandex proved such a popular fiber in the garment industry that, by 1987, DuPont had trouble meeting worldwide demand. In the 1990s a variety of other items made with spandex proved popular, including a successful line of body-shaping foundation garments sold under the trade name Bodyslimmers. As the decade progressed, shirts, pants, dresses, and even shoes were being made with spandex blends, and mass-market retailers like Banana Republic were even using it for menswear.

In 2019, control of the Lycra Company was sold by Koch Industries to Shandong Ruyi.

On March 17, 2026, The LYCRA Company LLC and 25 affiliated debtors each filed a voluntary petition for relief under Chapter 11 of the United States Bankruptcy Code in the United States Bankruptcy Court for the Southern District of Texas.

== Environmental impact ==
Most clothes containing spandex are difficult to recycle. Even a 5% inclusion of spandex will render the fabric incompatible with most mechanical recycling machines.
