= Natural oil polyols =

Natural oil polyols, also known as NOPs or biopolyols, are polyols derived from vegetable oils by several different techniques. The primary use for these materials is in the production of polyurethanes. Most NOPs qualify as biobased products, as defined by the United States Secretary of Agriculture in the Farm Security and Rural Investment Act of 2002.

NOPs all have similar sources and applications, but the materials themselves can be quite different, depending on how they are made. All are clear liquids, ranging from colorless to medium yellow. Their viscosity is also variable and is usually a function of the molecular weight and the average number of hydroxyl groups per molecule (higher mw and higher hydroxyl content both giving higher viscosity.) Odor is a significant property which is different from NOP to NOP. Most NOPs are still quite similar chemically to their parent vegetable oils and as such are prone to becoming rancid. This involves autoxidation of fatty acid chains containing carbon-carbon double bonds and ultimately the formation of odoriferous, low molecular weight aldehydes, ketones and carboxylic acids. Odor is undesirable in the NOPs themselves, but more importantly, in the materials made from them.

There are a limited number of naturally occurring vegetable oils (triglycerides) which contain the unreacted hydroxyl groups that account for both the name and important reactivity of these polyols. Castor oil is the only commercially available natural oil polyol that is produced directly from a plant source: all other NOPs require chemical modification of the oils directly available from plants.

The hope is that using renewable resources as feedstocks for chemical processes will reduce the environmental footprint by reducing the demand on non-renewable fossil fuels currently used in the chemical industry and reduce the overall production of carbon dioxide, the most notable greenhouse gas. One NOP producer, Cargill, estimates that its BiOH(TM)polyol manufacturing process produces 36% less global warming emissions (carbon dioxide), a 61% reduction in non-renewable energy use (burning fossil fuels), and a 23% reduction in the total energy demand, all relative to polyols produced from petrochemicals.

== Sources of natural oil polyols ==
Ninety percent of the fatty acids that make up castor oil is ricinoleic acid, which has a hydroxyl group on C-12 and a carbon-carbon double bond. The structure below shows the major component of castor oil which is composed of the tri-ester of rincinoleic acid and glycerin:

Major component of castor oil

Other vegetable oils - such as soy bean oil, peanut oil, and canola oil - contain carbon-carbon double bonds, but no hydroxyl groups. There are several processes used to introduce hydroxyl groups onto the carbon chain of the fatty acids, and most of these involve oxidation of the C-C double bond. Treatment of the vegetal oils with ozone cleaves the double bond, and esters or alcohols can be made, depending on the conditions used to process the ozonolysis product. The example below shows the reaction of triolein with ozone and ethylene glycol.

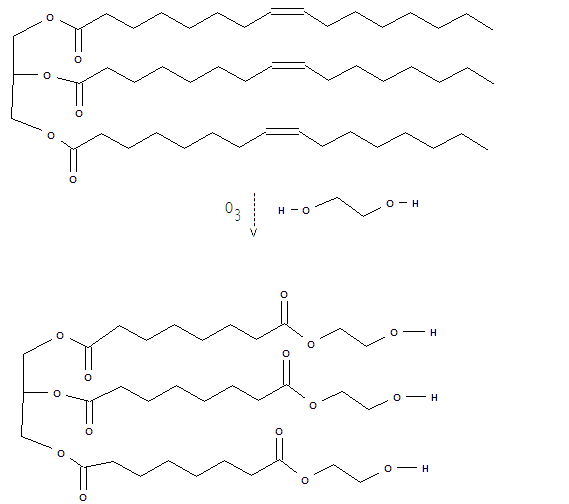
Ozonolysis of unsaturated triglyceride

Air oxidation, (autoxidation), the chemistry involved in the "drying" of drying oils, gives increased molecular weight and introduces hydroxyl groups. The radical reactions involved in autoxidation can produce a complex mixture of crosslinked and oxidized triglycerides. Treatment of vegetable oils with peroxy acids gives epoxides which can be reacted with nucleophiles to give hydroxyl groups. This can be done as a one-step process. Note that in the example shown below only one of the three fatty acid chains is drawn fully, the other part of the molecule is represented by "R_{1}" and the nucleophile is unspecified. Earlier examples also include acid catalyzed ring opening of epoxidized soybean oil to make oleochemical polyols for polyurethane foams and acid catalyzed ring opening of soy fatty acid methyl esters with multifunctional polyols to form new polyols for casting resins.

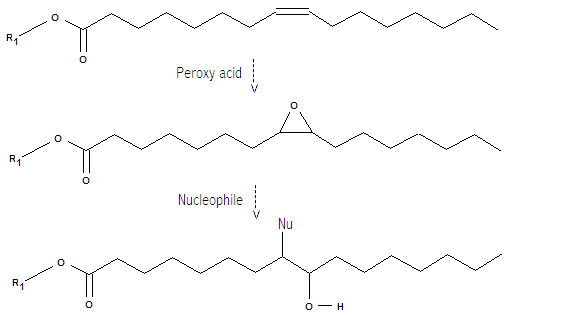
Epoxidation and ring opening of unsaturated triglyceride

Triglycerides of unsaturated (containing carbon-carbon double bonds) fatty acids or methyl esters of these acids, can be treated with carbon monoxide and hydrogen in the presence of a metal catalyst to add a -CHO (formyl) groups to the chain (hydroformylation reaction) followed by hydrogenation to give the needed hydroxyl groups. In this case R_{1} can be the rest of the triglyceride, or a smaller group such as methyl (in which case the substrate would be similar to biodiesel). If R=Me then additional reactions like transesterification are needed to build up a polyol.

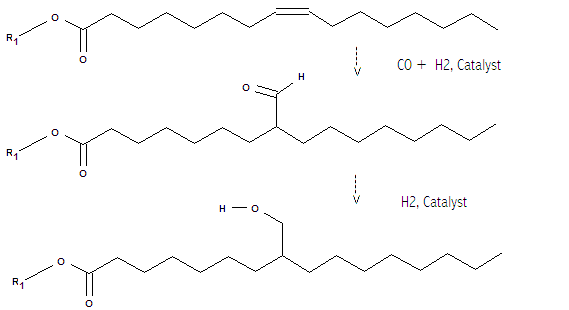
Hydroformylation and reduction of unsaturated triglyceride

== Uses ==
Castor oil has found numerous applications, many of them due to the presence of the hydroxyl group that allows chemical derivatization of the oil or modifies the properties of castor oil relative to vegetable oils which do not have the hydroxyl group. Castor oil undergoes most of the reactions that alcohols do, but the most industrially important one is reaction with diisocyanates to make polyurethanes.

Castor oil by itself has been used in making a variety of polyurethane products, ranging from coatings to foams, and the use of castor oil derivatives continues to be an area of active development. Castor oil derivatized with propylene oxide makes polyurethane foam for mattresses and yet another new derivative is used in coatings

Apart from castor oil, which is a relatively expensive vegetable oil and is not produced domestically in many industrialized countries, the use of polyols derived from vegetable oils to make polyurethane products began attracting attention beginning around 2004. The rising costs of petrochemical feedstocks and an enhanced public desire for environmentally friendly green products have created a demand for these materials. One of the most vocal supporters of these polyurethanes made using natural oil polyols is the Ford Motor Company, which debuted polyurethane foam made using soy oil in the seats of its 2008 Ford Mustang. Ford has since placed soy foam seating in all its North American vehicle platforms. The interest of automakers is responsible for much of the work being done on the use of NOPs in polyurethane products for use in cars, for example is seats, and headrests, armrests, soundproofing, and even body panels.

One of the first uses for NOPs (other than castor oil) was to make spray-on polyurethane foam insulation for buildings.

NOPs are also finding use in polyurethane slab foam used to make conventional mattresses as well as memory foam mattresses.

The characteristics of NOPs can be varied over a very wide range. This can be done by selection of the base Natural Oil (or oils) used to make up the NOP. Also, using known and increasingly novel (Garrett & Du) chemical techniques, it is possible to graft additional groups onto the triglyceride chains of the NOP and change its processing characteristics and this in turn will change and modify in a controlled manner, the physical properties of the final article which the NOP is being used to produce. Differences and modifications in the process regime and reaction conditions used to make a given NOP also generally lead to different chemical architectures and therefore different end use performance of that NOP; so that even though two NOPs may have been made from the same Natural Oil root, they may be surprisingly different when used and, will produce a detectably different end product too. Commercially, (since 2012) NOPs are available and made from; sawgrass oil, soybean oil, castor oil (as a grafted NOP), rapeseed oil, palm oil (kernel and mesocarp), and coconut oil. There is also some work being done on NOPs made from Natural Animal oils.

Initially in the US, and since early 2010, it has been routinely possible to replace over 50% of petrochemical-based polyols with NOPs for use in slab foams sold into the mass market, furniture and bedding industries. The commercialised technology also eliminates or greatly reduces the odor problem, mentioned above, normally associated with the use of NOPs. This is particularly important when the NOP is to be used at ever higher percentage levels, to try to reduce dependency on petrochemical materials, and to produce materials for use in the domestic and contract furniture segments which are historically very sensitive to "chemical" odors in the final foam product in people's homes and places of work.

Amongst other useful effects of using high levels of Natural Oil Polyols to make foams are the improvements seen in the long-term performance of the foam under humid conditions and also on the flammability of the foams; compared to equivalent foams made without the presence of the NOP. People perspire; and so foams used for the construction of matrasses or furniture will, over time, tend to feel softer and give less support. The perspiration gradually softens the foam. Foams made with high levels of NOPs are much less prone to this problem, so that the useful lifetime of the upholstered product can be extended. The use of high levels of NOP also make it possible to manufacture foams with flame retardants which are permanent, and therefore are not later emitted into the household or work place environment. These relatively recently developed materials can be added at very low levels to NOP foams to pass such well known tests as California Technical Bulletin 117, which is a well-known flammability test for furniture. These permanent flame-retardants are halogen free and key into the foam matrix and are therefore fixed there. An additional effect of using these new, highly efficient, permanent flame retardants, is that the smoke seen during these standard fire tests, may be considerably reduced compared to that produced when testing foams made using non-permanent flame retardant materials, which do not key themselves into the foam structure. More recent work during 2014 with this "Green Chemistry" has shown that foams containing about 50 percent by weight of natural oils can be made which produce far less smoke when involved in fire situations. The ability of these low emission foams to reduce smoke emissions by up to 80% is an interesting property which will aid escape from fire situations and also lessen the risks for first responders i.e. emergency services in general and fire department personnel in particular.

Other technology can be combined with these flammability characteristics to give foams, which have extremely low overall emissions of volatile organic compounds, known as VOCs.
