= RRIM =

RRIM may refer to:

- Reaction injection molding
- Rubber Research Institute of Malaysia
