= DMDEE =

Names
- IUPAC name 4-[2-(2-morpholin-4-ylethoxy)ethyl]morpholine

Identifiers
CAS Number	6425-39-4
3D model (JSmol)	Interactive image
ChEMBL	ChEMBL3187951
ChemSpider	73018
ECHA InfoCard	100.026.540
EC Number	229-194-7
PubChem CID	80900
UNII	5BH27U8GG4
CompTox Dashboard (EPA)	DTXSID9042170
- InChI: InChI=1S/C12H24N2O3/c1-7-15-8-2-13(1)5-11-17-12-6-14-3-9-16-10-4-14/h1-12H2 Key: ZMSQJSMSLXVTKN-UHFFFAOYSA-N
- SMILES: C1COCCN1CCOCCN2CCOCC2

Properties
Chemical formula	C_{12}H_{24}N_{2}O_{3}
Molar mass	244.335 g·mol^{−1}

Hazards
- GHS labelling
Pictograms	(GHS07: Exclamation mark)
Signal word	Warning
Hazard statements	H315, H319
Precautionary statements	P264, P264+P265, P280, P302+P352, P305+P351+P338, P321, P332+P317, P337+P317, P362+P364

Related compounds
Related compounds	1,2-Dimorpholinoethane
- Except where otherwise noted, data are given for materials in their standard state (at 25 °C [77 °F], 100 kPa). Infobox references

DMDEE is an acronym for dimorpholinodiethyl ether but is almost always referred to as DMDEE (pronounced dumdee) in the polyurethane industry. It is an organic chemical, specifically a nitrogen-oxygen heterocycle with tertiary amine functionality. It is a catalyst used mainly to produce polyurethane foam. It has the CAS number 6425-39-4 and is TSCA and REACH registered and on EINECS with the number 229-194-7. The IUPAC name is 4-[2-(2-morpholin-4-ylethoxy)ethyl]morpholine and the chemical formula C_{12}H_{24}N_{2}O_{3}.

== Other names ==
Main section reference.

- Morpholine, 4,4'-(oxydi-2,1-ethanediyl)bis-
- Bis(2-morpholinoethyl) Ether
- 4,4'-(Oxybis(ethane-2,1-diyl))dimorpholine
- 2,2-Dimorpholinodiethylether
- 2,2'-Dimorpholinodiethyl ether
- 4,4'-(Oxydiethylene)bis(morpholine)
- 4-[2-(2-morpholin-4-ylethoxy)ethyl]morpholine
- 2,2'-Dimorpholinyldiethyl ether

== Use as a polyurethane catalyst ==
DMDEE tends to be used in one-component rather than 2-component polyurethane systems. Its use has been investigated in polyurethanes for controlled drug release and also adhesives for medical applications. Its use as a catalyst including the kinetics and thermodynamics have been studied and reported on extensively. It is a popular catalyst along with DABCO.

== Toxicity ==
The material has been in use for some time and so the toxicity is generally well understood. However, some sources say toxicity data is limited and work continues to acquire the necessary data and publish to ensure it is in the public domain.
