= C6H15NO2 =

The molecular formula C_{6}H_{15}NO_{2} (molar mass: 133.189 g/mol, exact mass: 133.1103 u) may refer to:

- Aminoacetaldehyde diethylacetal
- Diisopropanolamine
- 2-(2-(Dimethylamino)ethoxy)ethanol
