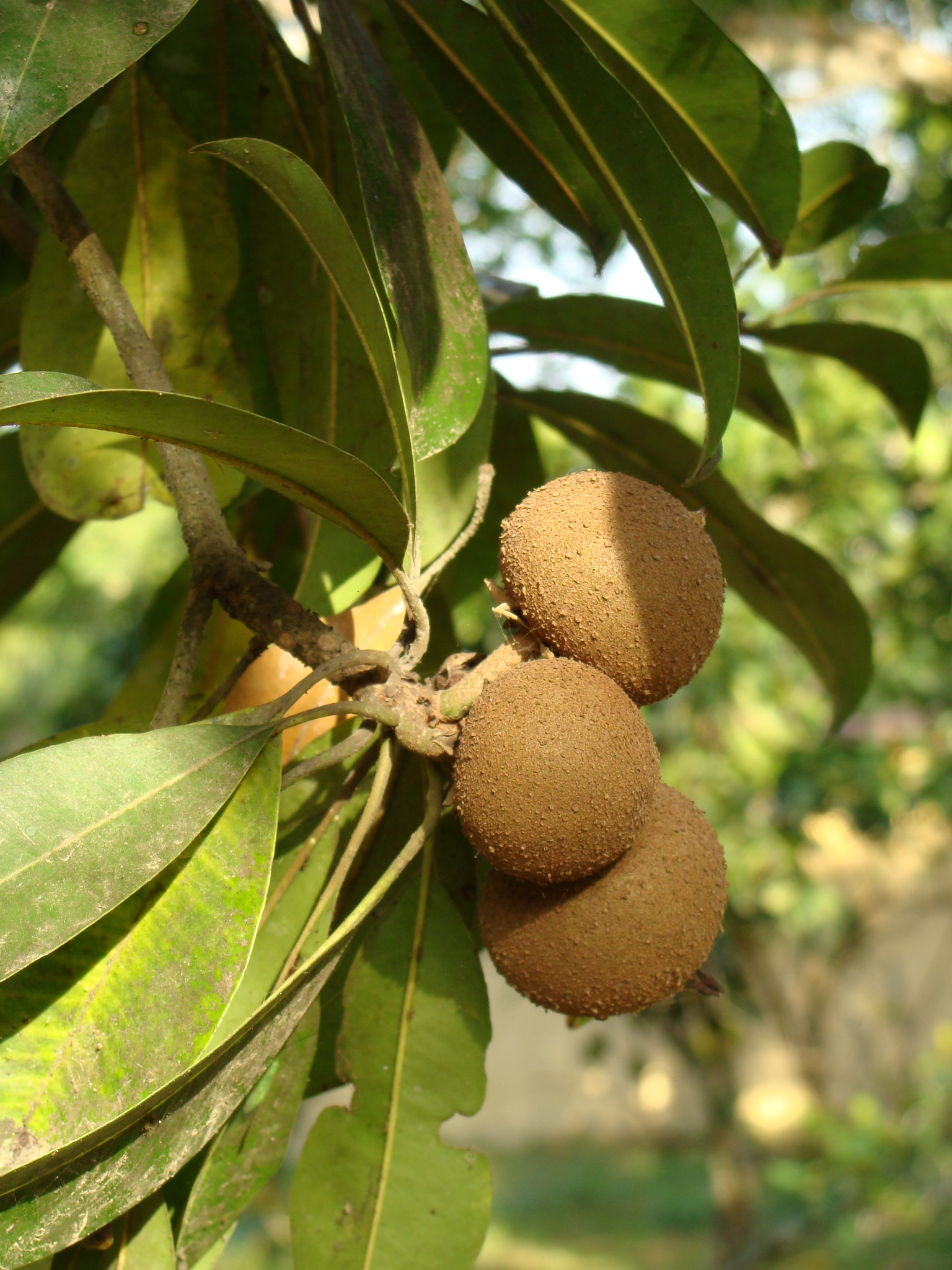

Scientific classification
- Kingdom: Plantae
- Clade: Tracheophytes
- Clade: Angiosperms
- Clade: Eudicots
- Clade: Asterids
- Order: Ericales
- Family: Sapotaceae
- Genus: Manilkara
- Species: M. huberi

Binomial name
- Manilkara huberi (Ducke) A.Chev.

Synonyms
- Mimusops huberi Ducke

= Manilkara huberi =

Species of flowering plant

Manilkara huberi, also known as masaranduba, níspero, and sapotilla, is a fruit bearing plant of the genus Manilkara of the family Sapotaceae.

== Geographical distribution ==
Manilkara huberi is native to large parts of northern South America, Central America and the Antilles, at elevations below 800 metres (2,600 ft) above sea level.

== Description ==
Manilkara huberi is a large tree, reaching heights of 30–55 metres (98–180 ft). The leaves are oblong, approximately 1–2 decimetres (3.9–7.9 in) in length, with yellow undersides. The flowers are hermaphroditic; white with 3 sepals. The edible fruit is yellow and ovoid, 3 centimetres (1.2 in) in diameter, containing one seed (or occasionally two).

== Uses ==
The fruit of the M. huberi is similar to the sapodilla and is edible, with excellent flavor and is popular for use in desserts. Etymologically speaking, "Sapodilla" derives from the Nahuatl word "tzapotl" which refers to any sweet fruit with a soft flesh. Hence many species of Manilkara may be colloquially called "sapote" or "sapodilla" and indeed a number of unrelated fruit trees such as Pouteria sapota.

M. huberi produces an edible latex called Chicle that can be harvested in a manner similar to the harvesting of the latex of the rubber tree (Hevea brasiliensis). The latex dries to an inelastic rubber, which is considered inferior to gutta-percha.

The latex from M. huberi was used to make golf ball covers, along with that the better known and more widespread M. bidentata ("Balata" or "Massaranduba.") Latex products from a number of Manilkara species being interchangeably called "balata", "Gutta Balata", or more generally "Chicle." It was considered a good quality, but short-lived, cover, requiring frequent recoating or replacement. Balls with Balata coatings had a high spin rate. Yet it was popular in tournaments among professionals and low handicap players. Modern materials such as Polyurethane Elastomer and Methacrylic Acid copolymers have made Balata golf balls largely obsolete by the late 20th century, as they have much better abrasion resistance and generally lower air drag.

The tree is also used for lumber in Puerto Rico. The wood is red and very hard, and is popular for use in furniture making, construction, and railway ties. The wood is so dense to the point that it may not float in water, and requires pre-drilling before nailing. The specific gravity of M. huberi wood is between 0.85 and 0.95 g/cm^{3}.

== Synonyms ==
Manilkara huberi is also known as:

- Manilkara jaimiqui C. Wright ex Griseb.; Dubard
- Mimusops huberi Ducke
- Mimusops jaimiqui C. Wright ex Griseb.
