= Triol =

Chemical compound with three hydroxyl (–OH) groups

In chemistry, a triol is an organic compound containing three hydroxyl groups (−OH functional groups), such as glycerol.

== See also ==
- Chemical compounds with one hydroxyl group
  - Alcohols
  - Phenols
  - Enols
  - Ynols
- Polyols, chemical compounds with multiple hydroxyl groups
  - Diols, chemical compounds with two hydroxyl groups
