= Otto Bayer =

German chemist (1902–1982)

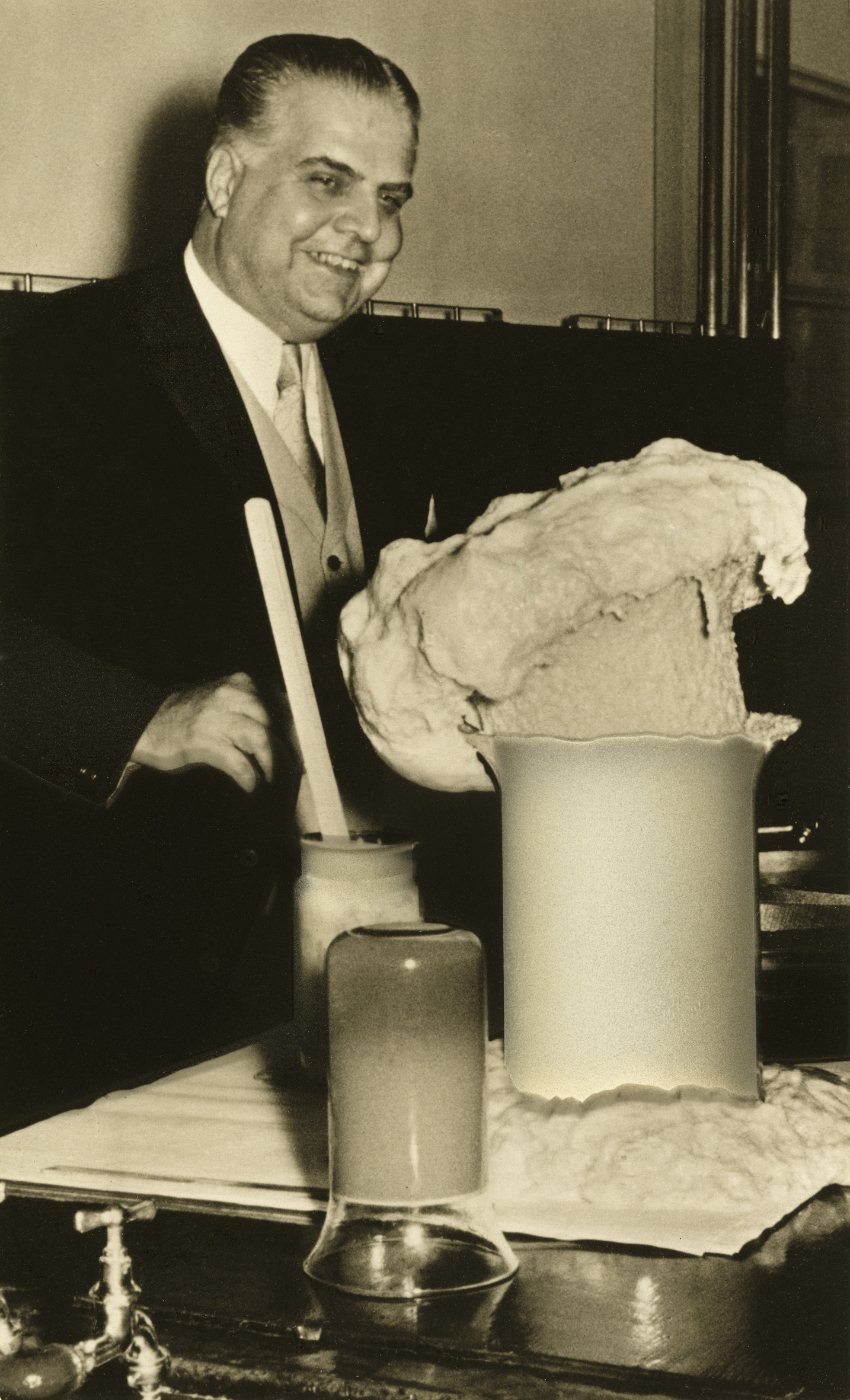
- Otto Bayer demonstrated in 1952 his invention Polyurethane
- Born: 4 November 1902; Frankfurt, Hesse, Germany
- Died: 1 August 1982 (aged 79); Burscheid, Rheinisch-Bergischer Kreis, North Rhine-Westphalia, Germany
- Occupation: Chemist

Otto Bayer (4 November 1902 – 1 August 1982) was a German industrial chemist at IG Farben who was head of the research group that in 1937 discovered the polyaddition for the synthesis of polyurethanes out of poly-isocyanate and polyol.

Bayer was not related to the founding family of Bayer Corp. Today polyurethanes are ubiquitous throughout modern life. He was a member of the board of directors and of the supervisory board of Bayer, and was also vice chairman of the supervisory board of Cassella in the 1950s.

Bayer was the 1975 recipient of the Charles Goodyear Medal. He was the 1974 recipient of the Carl-Dietrich-Harries-Medal for commendable scientific achievements.

== Gallery ==
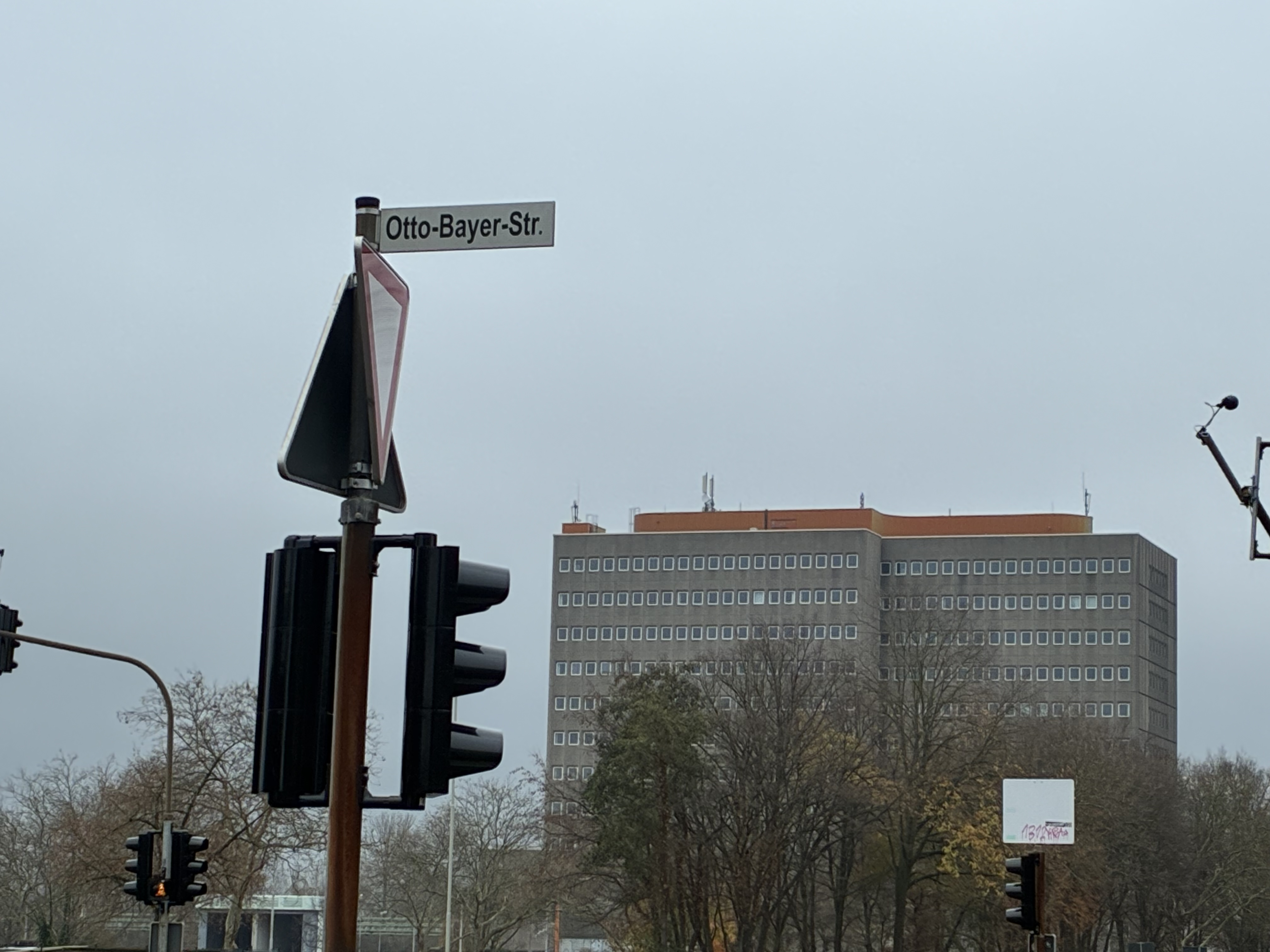
Street name sign, Otto-Bayer-Straße, Leverkusen, Germany.
