= Dibutyltin dilaurate =

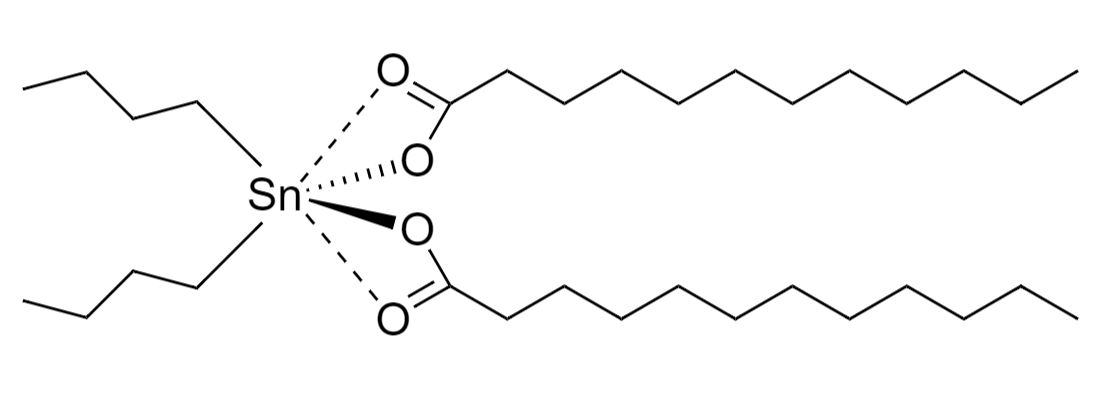

Names
- IUPAC name [Dibutyl(dodecanoyloxy)stannyl] dodecanoate
- Other names: Butynorate; Davainex; DBTDL; DBTL; Dibutylbis(lauroyloxy)tin; Dibutylstannylene dilaurate; Dibutyltin didodecanoate; Dibutyltindilaurate; Lauric acid, 1,1'-(dibutylstannylene) ester; Stabilizer D-22; T 12 (catalyst); Tinostat

Identifiers
CAS Number	77-58-7
3D model (JSmol)	Interactive image
ChemSpider	21106564
ECHA InfoCard	100.000.946
EC Number	201-039-8
PubChem CID	16682738
RTECS number	WH7000000
UNII	L4061GMT90
UN number	3146
CompTox Dashboard (EPA)	DTXSID301014847 DTXSID6024961, DTXSID301014847
- InChI: InChI=1S/2C12H24O2.2C4H9.Sn/c2*1-2-3-4-5-6-7-8-9-10-11-12(13)14;2*1-3-4-2;/h2*2-11H2,1H3,(H,13,14);2*1,3-4H2,2H3;/q;;;;+2/p-2 Key: UKLDJPRMSDWDSL-UHFFFAOYSA-L; InChI=1/2C12H24O2.2C4H9.Sn/c2*1-2-3-4-5-6-7-8-9-10-11-12(13)14;2*1-3-4-2;/h2*2-11H2,1H3,(H,13,14);2*1,3-4H2,2H3;/q;;;;+2/p-2/rC32H64O4Sn/c1-5-9-13-15-17-19-21-23-25-27-31(33)35-37(29-11-7-3,30-12-8-4)36-32(34)28-26-24-22-20-18-16-14-10-6-2/h5-30H2,1-4H3 Key: UKLDJPRMSDWDSL-PFKFAYPQAT
- SMILES: CCCCCCCCCCCC(=O)O[Sn](CCCC)(CCCC)OC(=O)CCCCCCCCCCC

Properties
Chemical formula	(CH_{3}(CH_{2})_{10}CO_{2})_{2}Sn((CH_{2})_{3}CH_{3})_{2}
Molar mass	631.570 g·mol^{−1}
Appearance	Colourless oily liquid or soft waxy crystals
Odor	Fatty
Density	1.066 g/cm^{3}
Melting point	22 to 24 °C (72 to 75 °F; 295 to 297 K)
Boiling point	205 °C at 1.3 kPa
Solubility in water	Practically insoluble (0.00143 g/l at 68 °F (20 °C))
Solubility	Practically insoluble in methanol Soluble in petroleum ether, benzene, acetone, ether, carbon tetrachloride, organic esters
Vapor pressure	<0.01 hPa (0.2 mmHg at 25 °C)
Refractive index (n_{D})	1.4683 at 20 °C (for light at wavelength of 589.29 nm)
Viscosity	42 cP

Hazards
- Occupational safety and health (OHS/OSH)
Main hazards	Very toxic, very flammable, causes serious injuries to skin, eyes, thymus, lungs and other organs. Can cause paralysis.
- GHS labelling
Pictograms	(GHS07: Exclamation mark) (GHS08: Health hazard) (GHS09: Environmental hazard)
Signal word	Danger
Hazard statements	H317, H319, H341, H360, H360FD, H370, H372, H410
Precautionary statements	P201, P202, P260, P264, P270, P272, P273, P280, P281, P302+P352, P305+P351+P338, P307+P311, P319, P333+P313, P337+P313, P363, P391, P405, P501
Flash point	191 °C
- Lethal dose or concentration (LD, LC)
LD_{50} (median dose)	175 mg/kg (oral, rat); 33 mg/kg (intravenous, rat); 210 mg/kg (oral, mouse); 100 mg/kg (oral, rabbit)
LC_{50} (median concentration)	150 mg/m^{3} (inhalation, mouse, 2 hours)
- Except where otherwise noted, data are given for materials in their standard state (at 25 °C [77 °F], 100 kPa). Infobox references

Dibutyltin dilaurate (abbreviated DBTDL) is an organotin compound with the formula (CH_{3}(CH_{2})_{10}CO_{2})_{2}Sn(CH_{2}CH_{2}CH_{2}CH_{3})_{2}. It is a colorless viscous and oily liquid. It is used as a catalyst.

== Description ==
Dibutyltin dilaurate consists of two laurate groups and two butyl groups coordinated to a tin(IV) atom. The coordination geometry at the tin center is tetrahedral. Based on the crystal structure of the related bis(bromobenzoate), the oxygen atoms of the carbonyl groups are weakly bonded to tin atom. The compound is a dibutyltin(IV) ester of lauric acid.

== Decomposition ==
Upon heating to decomposition temperature (which is above 250 °C), dibutyltin dilaurate emits acrid smoke and fumes.

== Uses ==
Dibutyltin dilaurate is used as a paint additive. Together with dibutyltin dioctanoate, dibutyltin dilaurate is used as a catalyst for polyurethane production from isocyanates and diols. It is also useful as a catalyst for transesterification and for the room temperature vulcanization of silicones. It is also used as a stabilizer in polyvinyl chloride, vinyl ester resins, lacquers, and elastomers. It is also added to animal feed to remove cecal worms, roundworms, and tapeworms in chickens and turkeys and to prevent or provide treatment against hexamitosis and coccidiosis.

== Hazards and toxicity ==
Dibutyltin dilaurate can be absorbed through the skin. It irritates skin and eyes (causes redness of skin and eyes). It is a neurotoxin. It can cause injuries to the liver, kidneys, and gastrointestinal tract. The symptoms of poisoning with dibutyltin dilaurate include nausea, headache, muscular weakness and even paralysis.

Dibutyltin dilaurate is very reactive with acids and oxidizers, and it is combustible. It emits irritating and toxic fumes and smoke when burned, which contain tin, tin oxides and carbon oxides. Moreover, its vapor is much denser than air (21.8 times so), so it can spread on floors, resulting in explosive conditions or asphyxiation hazards.

== Related compounds ==
- Dibutyltin dioctanoate (CH_{3}(CH_{2})_{6}CO_{2})_{2}Sn(CH_{2}CH_{2}CH_{2}CH_{3})_{2}: CAS#4731-77-5
- Dibutyltin diacetate (CH_{3}CO_{2})_{2}Sn(CH_{2}CH_{2}CH_{2}CH_{3})_{2}: CAS #1067-33-0
