= Joseph Shivers =

American textile chemist (1920–2014)

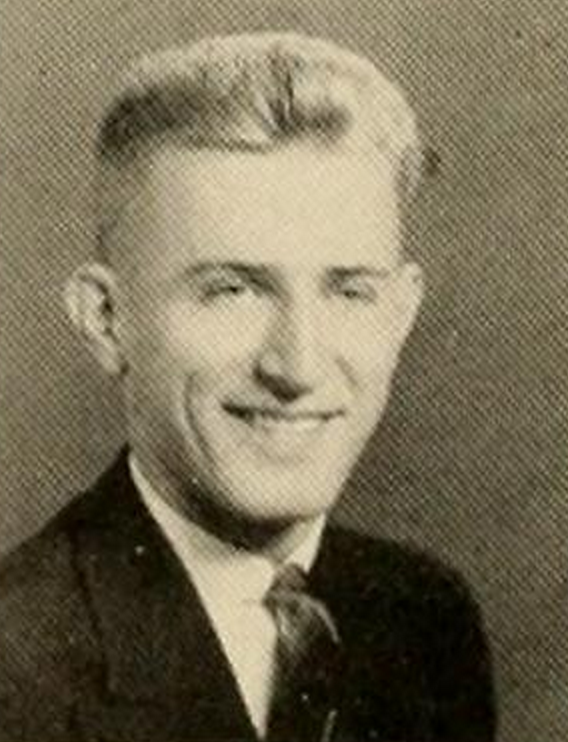
- Pictured in the Chanticleer 1942, Duke University yearbook
- Born: Joseph Clois Shivers Jr. November 29, 1920; Marlton, New Jersey, United States
- Died: September 1, 2014 (aged 93); Venice, Florida, United States
- Education: Duke University (B.Sc. 1942, M.A. 1943, Ph.D 1946)
- Known for: development of Lycra (Spandex)
- Awards: Olney Medal (AATCC); Lavoisier Medal (DuPont)
- Scientific career
- Fields: organic chemistry, textile chemistry
- Workplaces: DuPont, Canisius College

Joseph Clois Shivers Jr. (November 29, 1920 – September 1, 2014) was an American textile chemist who was based in West Chester, Pennsylvania, best known for his role in the structural development of Spandex, a thermoplastic elastomer, in the 1950s, while employed at DuPont.

Shivers was born in 1920 in Marlton, New Jersey. He received his B.Sc., M.A. and Ph.D. (in organic chemistry) from Duke University in the 1940s. During the course of the war, still as a student, he worked with the United States government to develop a drug to counter malaria for use by troops overseas. Shivers began working for DuPont in 1946 as a researcher on polymers. After working on other polyester projects, Shivers joined a project to synthesize a "synthetic elastomer to replace rubber", which was common in garments at the time. Though the project was shelved at some point, Shivers made a breakthrough in the 1950s when he attempted a modification of the polyester Dacron, which produced a stretchy fibre that could withstand heat, be spun into filaments, and stretch 5 times its original length while retaining elasticity. The results were favorable and Shivers, along with other employees, set out to perfect the new polyester. In 1959 it was completed and released under the name Fibre K, later changed to Lycra. He was promoted to supervisor after the breakthrough. It was commercialized by DuPont in 1962 and became widespread in the garment industry, including sports garments, swimsuits, hosiery and undergarments. By the early 1990s, Lycra was one of the most lucrative facets of the synthetic fiber department at Dupont. Shivers was also on the faculty of Canisius College while working at DuPont. He retired from DuPont in 1980, as technical director of the fiber department.

In 1998, he was awarded the prestigious Olney Medal for Achievement in Textile Chemistry for his work by the American Association of Textile Chemists and Colorists, the 55th recipient of the medal in its history. Shivers was presented with it in a ceremony in Philadelphia, Pennsylvania at an AATCC Conference. His Olney Medal Address was entitled "The Search for a Superior Elastic Fibre". DuPont awarded Shivers with their Lavoisier Medal in 1995, the highest honor for the company.

He was married to Margaret Warren Shivers, originally from Ohio; with her he had three children. In his leisure time, he enjoyed woodworking and wine tasting. He was a member of the fraternity Phi Beta Kappa as well as the American Chemical Society. On September 1, 2014, Shivers died in Venice, Florida.
