= Diethyl toluene diamine =

- Main component

Names
- IUPAC name 2,4-Diethyl-6-methylbenzene-1,3-diamine
- Other names DETDA

Identifiers
CAS Number	2095-02-5 (main component); 68479-98-1 (unspecified isomer); 75389-89-8 (two major isomers)
3D model (JSmol)	Interactive image
ChemSpider	14172719
ECHA InfoCard	100.064.414
PubChem CID	74980
UNII	P34Q686WFH
CompTox Dashboard (EPA)	DTXSID0028618
- InChI: InChI=1S/C11H18N2/c1-4-8-6-7(3)10(12)9(5-2)11(8)13/h6H,4-5,12-13H2,1-3H3 Key: PISLZQACAJMAIO-UHFFFAOYSA-N
- SMILES: CCC1=C(C(=C(C(=C1)C)N)CC)N

Properties
Chemical formula	C_{11}H_{18}N_{2}
Molar mass	178.279 g·mol^{−1}

Hazards
- GHS labelling
Pictograms	(GHS07: Exclamation mark) (GHS08: Health hazard) (GHS09: Environmental hazard)
Signal word	Warning
Hazard statements	H302, H312, H319, H373, H410
Precautionary statements	P260, P264, P264+P265, P270, P273, P280, P301+P317, P302+P352, P305+P351+P338, P317, P319, P321, P330, P337+P317, P362+P364, P391, P501
- Except where otherwise noted, data are given for materials in their standard state (at 25 °C [77 °F], 100 kPa). Infobox references

Diethyl toluene diamine (DETDA) is a liquid aromatic organic molecule with formula C_{11}H_{18}N_{2}. It is chemically an aromatic diamine and has the CAS Registry number of 68479-98-1. It has more than one isomer and the mixture of the two main isomers is given a different CAS number of 75389-89-8. It is often marketed as a less toxic version of 4,4'-methylenedianiline (MDA). It is also used to replace the more toxic 4,4'-methylenebis(2-chloroaniline) (MOCA). The toxicology is reasonably well understood.

== Uses ==
DETDA is an industrial chemical used in the injection molding industry. One of the reasons it is used in RIM is because it gives very short demold times. It is also used extensively in polyurethanes and in both spray polyureas and elastomers. When used in elastomer production these can be used as an energy absorbing system in automobiles. It is a diamine and thus in polymer science terms is a Chain extender rather than a chain terminator. Chain extenders (f = 2) and cross linkers (f ≥ 3) are low molecular weight amine terminated compounds that play an important role in polyurea compounds, elastomers and adhesives. DETDA is one such amine and is used extensively in reaction injection molding (RIM) and in polyurethane and polyurea elastomer formulations.

Pyrolysis in combination with other materials can produce a carbon-based molecular sieve. Carbon nanotubes have also been produced and studied with the material. There are other more specialist uses for the material too.

As it is an aromatic amine, its rate of cure is much slower than aliphatic amines and thus used with epoxy resin systems to lengthen the working time or potlife. These are then used in adhesives, sealants, and paints or coatings. It is often used with epoxy resins for its excellent mechanical properties. Epoxy formulations based on DETDA also tend to have good high temperature properties.

== Supply ==
DETDA is produced globally and is thus fairly strategically important.

== See also ==
- Aniline

== External websites ==
- Albermale DETDA
- Safety Data Sheet
- CheMondis DETDA information
- Leticia Chemicals DETDA
