= Impinging mixer =

Impinging mixers combine and disperse resins within each other, and are often used in reaction injection molding (RIM). Mixing occurs as two high velocity streams collide in a mixing chamber. High velocity results in a turbulent rather than a laminar flow.

Impingement mixing is most effective when it occurs at the center of the mixing chamber.

Thermosetting plastics cure by a chemical reaction between two resins. The resins must be mixed immediately before they are injected into a mold. The mixing can be done by impingement mixing, where two streams to collide at high velocity in a mixing chamber. As soon as the mixing chamber is full, a piston immediately pushes the mixed resin into the mold, leaving very little mixed resin curing outside the mold.
