= 1,2-Dimorpholinoethane =

Names
- Preferred IUPAC name 4,4′-(Ethane-1,2-diyl)dimorpholine

Identifiers
CAS Number	1723-94-0
3D model (JSmol)	Interactive image
ChEMBL	ChEMBL3408516
ChemSpider	65720
EC Number	217-026-5
PubChem CID	72888
UNII	FX7MP8BZX9
CompTox Dashboard (EPA)	DTXSID9061914
- InChI: InChI=1S/C10H20N2O2/c1(11-3-7-13-8-4-11)2-12-5-9-14-10-6-12/h1-10H2 Key: QRQKCMFVJWNKQI-UHFFFAOYSA-N
- SMILES: C1COCCN1CCN2CCOCC2

Properties
Chemical formula	C_{10}H_{20}N_{2}O_{2}
Molar mass	200.282 g·mol^{−1}

Hazards
- GHS labelling
Pictograms	(GHS05: Corrosive) (GHS07: Exclamation mark)
Signal word	Danger
Hazard statements	H315, H317, H318, H319, H335
Precautionary statements	P261, P264, P264+P265, P271, P272, P280, P302+P352, P304+P340, P305+P351+P338, P305+P354+P338, P317, P319, P321, P332+P317, P333+P313, P337+P317, P362+P364, P403+P233, P405, P501
- Except where otherwise noted, data are given for materials in their standard state (at 25 °C [77 °F], 100 kPa). Infobox references

1,2-Dimorpholinoethane is an organic chemical and specifically a nitrogen-oxygen heterocyclic compound. At room temperature it is a solid with a melting point of 75 °C. It has two tertiary amines in the same molecule meaning it is ideal for use as a polyurethane catalyst. It has the CAS Registry Number 1723-94-0 and is TSCA and REACH registered and on EINECS with the number 217-026-5. The IUPAC name is 4-(2-morpholin-4-ylethyl)morpholine and the chemical formula C_{10}H_{20}N_{2}O_{2}.

== Synonyms ==
Section reference.

- 4,4'-Ethylenedimorpholine
- 4,4'-(Ethane-1,2-diyl)bismorpholine
- Morpholine, 4,4'-(1,2-ethanediyl)bis-
- 1,2-Di-N-morpholinylethane
- Morpholine,4,4'-(1,2-ethanediyl)bis-
- Morpholine, 4,4'-ethylenedi-

== Uses and synthesis ==
As the molecule has two tertiary nitrogen atoms in the molecule, the substance finds use as a catalyst for polyurethane including PU foams.

1,2-Dimorpholinoethane has been used to make transition metal complexes. As there are two nitrogen atoms in the molecule it acts as a bidentate ligand in these complexes. These complexes have then been used in antibacterial applications.

== Toxicity ==
The toxicity of the compound and tertiary amines in general has been studied and published.
