= Chain extender =

In polymer chemistry, a chain extender is a low molecular weight (MW) reagent that converts polymeric precursors to higher molecular weight derivatives. Often, it is convenient to prepare a polymer at an intermediate MW, which are suitable for solution- or melt-processing. At or near the final stages of production, the material is treated with a chain extender. Typically, chain extenders are bifunctional, i.e., they have two functional groups, which can link together two polymers. Representative classes of chain extenders are diglycidyl ethers, diols, diamines, or dianhydrides. Chain extenders are most often applied to polyurethanes, where they usually string together diisocyanates within the polyurethane's "hard segment".

== Effects on physical properties ==
Chain extenders are often added to polymers improve their physical properties, as well as adding to their molecular weight. In particular, the addition of a chain extender will improve the thermal stability and viscosity of a polymer. With regards to specific polymers, chain extenders in polyurethanes can drive phase separation, interact with a regular hard segment structure, and promote hydrogen bonding between multiple hard segments. Chain extension applied to recycled polyethylene terephthalate result in extreme increases in torques, an increase in intrinsic viscosity, and higher glass transition temperatures due to increases in molecular weight. Chain extenders in polylactic acid (PLA) showed similar effects when applied, such as increasing viscosity and melt strength, reducing crystallinity, and decreasing thermal degradation. Furthermore, by increasing its molecular weight using chain extenders, the degradation mechanism of PLA can either increase or decrease depending on the chain extenders used. Early stage hydrolysis is slower, but the extended chains still degrade at comparable rates to regular PLA later on, while the thermal degradation of chain extended PLA is generally slower at higher temperatures.
