= Polytetrahydrofuran =

Poly(tetrahydrofuran)

Names
- Other names Poly(tetrahydrofuran), PolyTHF, polytetramethylene ether glycol, PTMEG, Terathane

Identifiers
CAS Number	25190-06-1
ChemSpider	none
ECHA InfoCard	100.131.584
CompTox Dashboard (EPA)	DTXSID2042307

Properties
Chemical formula	(C_{4}H_{8}O)_{n}
Molar mass	variable
Appearance	white, waxy-like
Density	0.982 g/cm^{3} (30 °C)
Melting point	23 to 28 °C (73 to 82 °F; 296 to 301 K)
- Except where otherwise noted, data are given for materials in their standard state (at 25 °C [77 °F], 100 kPa). verify (what is ?) Infobox references

Polytetrahydrofuran, also called poly(tetramethylene ether) glycol or poly(tetramethylene oxide), is a collection of chemical compounds with formula HO(CH_{2})_{4}O(CH_{2})_{4})_{n}OH or HO((CH_{2})_{4}O-)_{n}-H. The material is a mixture of polyether diols terminated with alcohol groups. It is produced by polymerization of tetrahydrofuran as well as 1,4-butanediol.

The product is commercially available as polymers of low average molecular weights, between 250 and 3000 daltons. In this form it is a white waxy solid that melts between 20 and 30 °C. The commercial product can be processed further into polymers with molecular weights of 40,000 and higher.

The product is sold under various trade names including Terathane from Invista and PolyTHF from BASF. The BASF plant in Ludwigshafen at one point was producing 250,000 metric tons per year.

== Applications ==
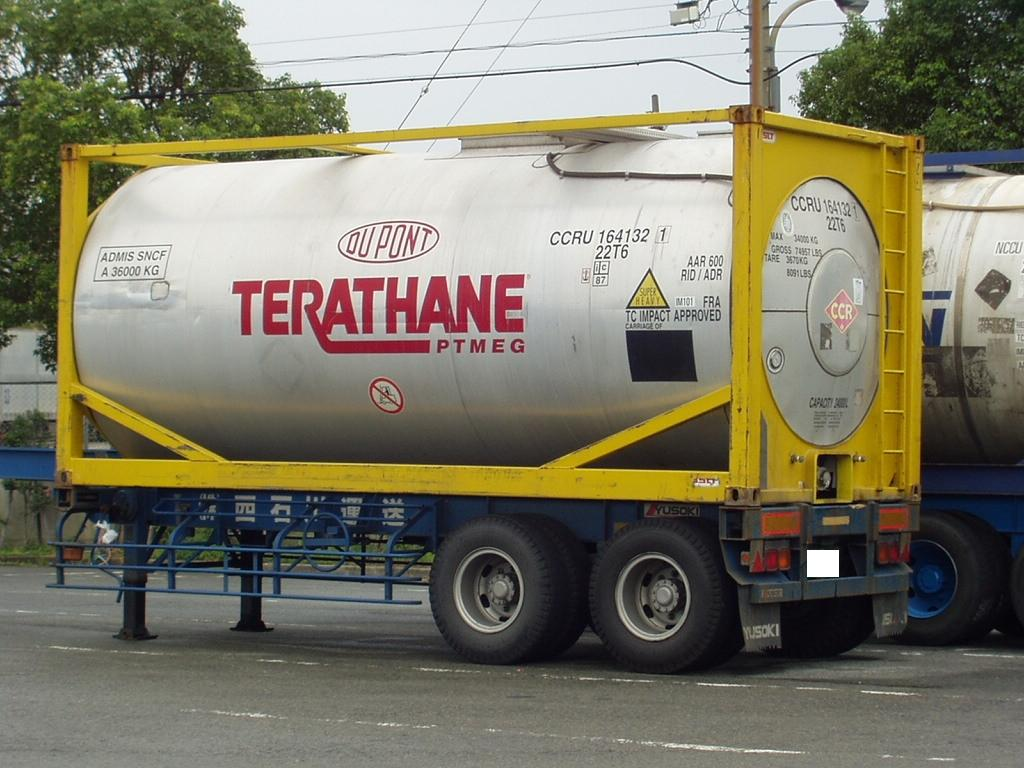
Terathane container owned by DuPont (before the business was sold to Invista).

The main use of polytetrahydrofuran is to make elastic fibres such as spandex (elastane) for stretchable fabrics and for polyurethane resins. The latter are polyurethane prepolymers dissolved in solvent. They are used in the manufacture of artificial leather. These elastomers are either polyurethanes made by reacting PTMEG with diisocyanates, or polyesters made by reacting PTMEG with diacids or their derivatives.

The polymer is also a starting material for thermoplastic polyurethane, thermoplastic polyesters, polyetheramide and cast polyurethane elastomers, used for instance in the wheels of roller skates and skateboards.

== Synthesis ==
Polytetrahydrofuran is commonly prepared by acid-catalyzed polymerization of tetrahydrofuran:

nC_{4}H_{8}O + H_{2}O → HO(CH_{2})_{4}[O(CH_{2})_{4}]_{n−1}OH

== Regulation ==
Polytetrahyrofuran polyethylene glycol can be controlled for export from the U.S. under the Export Administration Regulations on the Commerce Control List and/or on export control regulations based on the Wassenaar Arrangement (ECCN: 1C111.b.5). Under these regulations export/transfer of the product may require a license or export authorization.
