= Reaction injection molding =

Molding with thermosetting polymers

Reaction injection molding (RIM) is similar to injection molding except thermosetting polymers are used, which requires a curing reaction to occur within the mold.

Common items made via RIM include automotive bumpers, air spoilers, and fenders.

== Process ==
The two parts of the polymer are mixed together, usually by injecting them under high pressure into an impinging mixer. Then the mixture is injected under lower pressure into a mold. The mixture is allowed to sit in the mold long enough for it to expand and cure.

If reinforcing agents are added to the mixture then the process is known as reinforced reaction injection molding (RRIM). Common reinforcing agents include glass fibers and mica. This process is usually used to produce rigid foam automotive panels.

A subset of RIM is structural reaction injection molding (SRIM), which uses fiber meshes for the reinforcing agent. The fiber mesh is first arranged in the mold and then the polymer mixture is injection molded over it.

The most common RIM processable material is polyurethane (known generally as PU-RIM), but others include polyureas, polyisocyanurates, polyesters, polyphenols, polyepoxides, and nylon 6. For polyurethane one component of the mixture is polyisocyanate and the other component is a blend of polyol, surfactant, catalyst, and blowing agent.

== Advantages and disadvantages ==
Reaction injection molding can produce strong, flexible, lightweight parts which can easily be painted. It also has the advantage of quick cycle times compared to typical vacuum cast materials. The bi-component mixture injected into the mold has a much lower viscosity than molten thermoplastic polymers, therefore large, lightweight, and thin-walled items can be successfully RIM processed. This thinner mixture also requires less clamping forces, which leads to smaller equipment and ultimately lower capital expenditures. Another advantage of RIM processed foam is that a high-density skin is formed with a low-density core.

The disadvantages are slow cycle times, compared to injection molding, and expensive raw materials.

== Tooling ==
Machined steel or aluminum; cast aluminum; silicone rubber; epoxy resin; nickel. The machines can be large or small depending on the size of part required.
