= Polyol =

Organic compound with multiple –OH groups

In organic chemistry, a polyol is an organic compound containing multiple hydroxyl groups (−OH). The term "polyol" can have slightly different meanings depending on whether it is used in food science or polymer chemistry. Polyols containing two, three and four hydroxyl groups are diols, triols, and tetrols, respectively.

== Classification ==
Polyols may be classified according to their chemistry. Some of these chemistries are polyether, polyester, polycarbonate and also acrylic polyols. Polyether polyols may be further subdivided and classified as polyethylene oxide or polyethylene glycol (PEG), polypropylene glycol (PPG) and polytetrahydrofuran or PTMEG. These have 2, 3 and 4 carbon atoms respectively per oxygen atom in the repeat unit. Polycaprolactone polyols are also commercially available. There is also an increasing trend to use biobased (and hence renewable) polyols.

== Uses ==
Polyether polyols have numerous uses. As an example, polyurethane foam is a big user of polyether polyols.

Polyester polyols can be used to produce rigid foam. They are available in both aromatic and aliphatic versions. They are also available in mixed aliphatic-aromatic versions often made from recycled raw materials, typically polyethylene terephthalate (PET).

Acrylic polyols are generally used in higher performance applications where stability to ultraviolet light is required and also lower VOC coatings. Other uses include direct to metal coatings. As they are used where good UV resistance is required, such as automotive coatings, the isocyanate component also tends to be UV resistant and hence isocyanate oligomers or prepolymers based on Isophorone diisocyanate are generally used.

Caprolactone-based polyols produce polyurethanes with enhanced hydrolysis resistance.

Polycarbonate polyols are more expensive than other polyols and are thus used in more demanding applications. They have been used to make an isophorone diisocyanate based prepolymer which is then used in glass coatings. They may be used in reactive hotmelt adhesives.

All polyols may be used to produce polyurethane prepolymers. These then find use in coatings, adhesives, sealants and elastomers.

=== Low molecular weight polyols ===
Structure of an idealized alkyd resin derived from the polyol glycerol (red, a low molecular weight polyol) and phthalic anhydride.

Low molecular weight polyols are widely used in polymer chemistry where they function as crosslinking agents and chain extenders. Alkyd resins for example, use polyols in their synthesis and are used in paints and in molds for casting. They are the dominant resin or "binder" in most commercial "oil-based" coatings. Approximately 200,000 tons of alkyd resins are produced each year. They are based on linking reactive monomers through ester formation. Polyols used in the production of commercial alkyd resins are glycerol, trimethylolpropane, and pentaerythritol. In polyurethane prepolymer production, a low molecular weight polyol-diol such as 1,4-butanediol may be used as a chain extender to further increase molecular weight though it does increase viscosity because more hydrogen bonding is introduced.

Low molecular weight polyols

Pentaerythritol

Xylitol

=== Sugar alcohols ===
Sugar alcohols, a class of low molecular weight polyols, are commonly obtained by hydrogenation of sugars. They have the formula (CHOH)_{n}H_{2}, where n = 4–6.

Sugar alcohols are added to foods because of their lower caloric content than sugars; however, they are also, in general, less sweet, and are often combined with high-intensity sweeteners. They are also added to chewing gum because they are not broken down by bacteria in the mouth or metabolized to acids, and thus do not contribute to tooth decay. Maltitol, sorbitol, xylitol, erythritol, and isomalt are common sugar alcohols.

Sugar alcohols, such as myoinositol, pinitol, and mannitol, have roles in maintaining cellular water balance and responding to drought or low temperature stress.

=== Polymeric polyols ===
Polymeric polyols

Polyether polyol. The oxygen atoms of the ether linkages are shown in blue.

Polyester polyol. The oxygen and carbon atoms of the ester groups are shown in blue.

The term polyol is used for various chemistries of the molecular backbone. Polyols may be reacted with diisocyanates or polyisocyanates to produce polyurethanes. MDI finds considerable use in PU foam production. Polyurethanes are used to make flexible foam for mattresses and seating, rigid foam insulation for refrigerators and freezers, elastomeric shoe soles, fibers (e.g. Spandex), coatings, sealants and adhesives.

The term polyol is also attributed to other molecules containing hydroxyl groups. For instance, polyvinyl alcohol is (CH_{2}CHOH)_{n} with n hydroxyl groups where n can be in the thousands. Cellulose is a polymer with many hydroxyl groups, but it is not referred to as a polyol.

=== Polyols from recycled or renewable sources ===
There are polyols based on renewable sources such as plant-based materials including neem oil, castor oil, and cottonseed oil. Vegetable oils and biomass are also potential renewable polyol raw materials. Seed oil can even be used to produce polyester polyols.

== Properties ==
Since the generic term polyol is only derived from chemical nomenclature and just indicates the presence of several hydroxyl groups, no common properties can be assigned to all polyols. However, polyols are usually viscous at room temperature due to hydrogen bonding.

== See also ==
- Cyclitol
- Oligomer
- Polyurethane
