= 2-(2-(Dimethylamino)ethoxy)ethanol =

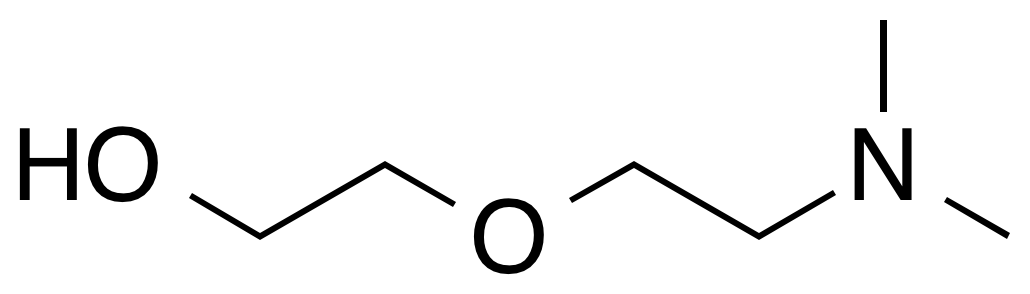

Names
- IUPAC name 2-[2-(dimethylamino)ethoxy]ethanol
- Other names: N,N-Dimethyldiglycolamine; (N,N-Dimethylaminoethoxy)ethanol; 2-(2-N,N-Dimethylaminoethoxy)ethanol

Identifiers
CAS Number	1704-62-7
3D model (JSmol)	Interactive image
ChEMBL	ChEMBL3188351
ChemSpider	66944
ECHA InfoCard	100.015.400
EC Number	216-940-1
PubChem CID	74348
UNII	C3YTX3O172
CompTox Dashboard (EPA)	DTXSID1027427
- InChI: InChI=1S/C6H15NO2/c1-7(2)3-5-9-6-4-8/h8H,3-6H2,1-2H3 Key: YSAANLSYLSUVHB-UHFFFAOYSA-N
- SMILES: CN(C)CCOCCO

Properties
Chemical formula	C_{6}H_{15}NO_{2}
Molar mass	133.191 g·mol^{−1}
Boiling point	95 °C (203 °F; 368 K)
Refractive index (n_{D})	1.442

Hazards
- GHS labelling
Pictograms	(GHS05: Corrosive) (GHS07: Exclamation mark)
Signal word	Danger
Hazard statements	H312, H314
Precautionary statements	P260, P264, P264+P265, P280, P301+P330+P331, P302+P352, P302+P361+P354, P304+P340, P305+P354+P338, P316, P317, P321, P362+P364, P363, P405, P501
Flash point	93 °C (199 °F; 366 K)
- Except where otherwise noted, data are given for materials in their standard state (at 25 °C [77 °F], 100 kPa). Infobox references

2-[2-(Dimethylamino)ethoxy]ethanol is an organic compound with the molecular formula C_{6}H_{15}NO_{2} and is a liquid at room temperature. Dimethylaminoethoxyethanol is polyfunctional, having a tertiary amine, ether and hydroxyl functionality. Like other organic amines, it acts as a weak base.

== Manufacture ==
Dimethylaminoethoxyethanol is manufactured by reacting dimethylamine and ethylene oxide. Other methods are also available producing streams rich in the substance which then need to be further purified.

== Uses ==
As dimethylaminoethoxyethanol is weakly basic, it has been studied as a method of absorbing Greenhouse gases and in particular carbon dioxide.

Dimethylaminoethoxyethanol is used extensively in surfactants which have also been evaluated as corrosion inhibitors. Surfactants prepared are usually cationic and may also be used as a biocide. This is particularly important for oilfield applications against Sulfate-reducing microorganisms.

The material has other uses which include:

- General such as clays, intermediates, plasticizers and adhesives.
- As a catalyst and especially for polyurethanes.
- Process regulators
- Propellants and blowing agents

== Toxicity ==
The toxicity of dimethylaminoethoxyethanol has been extensively studied.
