= Titration (disambiguation) =

Titration is a common laboratory method of quantitative chemical analysis that is used to determine the unknown concentration of a known reactant.

Titration may also refer to:

- Acid–base titration, based on the neutralization reaction
- Complexometric titration, based on the formation of a complex between the analyte and the titrant
- Drug titration, medical dose titration, the stepwise titration of doses to determine a desired effect
- Redox titration, based on an oxidation-reduction reaction
- Thermometric titration, an instrumental technique
- Zeta potential titration characterizes heterogeneous systems such as colloids
- Titration, a 2003 album by Active Ingredients
