= STC3141 =

Clinical data
- Other names: STC-3141; STC314; STC-314
- Routes of administration: Intravenous infusion
- Drug class: Extracellular histone neutralizer

Identifiers
- PubChem SID: 441652501

STC3141 is an extracellular histone neutralizer which is under development for the treatment of sepsis and COVID-19 pneumonia. It is given by intravenous infusion. The drug is a carbohydrate-based polyanion molecule of β-O-methyl cellobiose sulfate sodium salt (mCBS.Na). It may limit inflammation and organ damage in sepsis by blocking toxic circulating histones in the condition. Accordingly, the drug showed preliminary efficacy in reducing sepsis in a phase 2 clinical trial. STC3141 was developed by Griffith University and the Australian National University and is under development by Grand Pharmaceutical Group in China. As of January 2026, it is in phase 2 trials, with a phase 3 trial being planned.
