= Acetyl number =

Count of free hydroxyl groups in a fat or oil

Acetyl number, or acetyl value, is a measure of the number of free hydroxyl groups in a fat or oil. It is determined by how many milligrams of potassium hydroxide (KOH) are needed to neutralize the acetic acid released during the hydrolysis of one gram of an acetylated sample. Knowing a substance's hydroxyl group content allows you to characterize the lipid or natural wax substance. The acetyl number can determine a sample's quality, composition and properties.

== Determining the acetyl number ==
The acetyl number is determined by acetylating the free hydroxyl groups in a sample with acetic anhydride. This acetylation reaction attaches acetyl groups to all the free hydroxyl groups in the sample. The reaction mixture is then purified to remove excess reagent and other water-soluble impurities.

Next, the purified acetylated sample is then saponified with a measured amount of potassium hydroxide, which reacts with the acetate esters to form potassium acetate. The remaining, the mixture is cooled, and potassium hydroxide is measured by back-titration with standardized hydrochloric acid. Phenolphthalein is added as an indicator, making the solution appear pink. The solution is titrated with standardized hydrochloric acid until the pink color disappears. The amount of potassium hydroxide used is determined from the difference between the blank and sample titrations, according to the neutralization reaction: KOH + HCl → KCl + H_{2}O.

Eq. 1

$$\text{SV} = \frac{(B - V) \times N \times 56.11}{W}$$
where:
$B$ is the volume of HCl required for the blank titration, in mL;
$V$ is the volume of HCl required for the sample titration, in mL;
$N$ is the exact normality of the HCl titrant, in Eq/L;
56.11 is the molar mass of KOH, in g/mol;
$W$ is the mass of the sample portion, in grams.

By running this calculation for both saponifying the original and acetylated substance separately, two distinct variables are created, which are put into the acetyl number formula, the André–Cook formula.

Eq. 2

$$\text{Acetyl Number} = \frac{A - S}{1 - (0.00075 \times S)}$$
where:
$A$ is the saponification value of the acetylated sample, in mg KOH/g;
$S$ is the saponification value of the original sample, in mg KOH/g 0.00075 is the empirical correction factor used in the André–Cook formula.

== See also ==
- Saponification value - Milligrams of a base required to saponify 1g of fat
- Hydroxyl value - Mass of KOH needed to neutralize 1g of acetylized substance
- Ester value - Measure of ester content in fats and oils
- Amine value - the mass in mg of KOH needed to neutralize all amine groups in 1g sample
