= Amperometric titration =

Method of chemical analysis

Amperometric titration refers to a class of titrations in which the equivalence point is determined through measurement of the electric current produced by the titration reaction. It is a form of quantitative analysis.

== Background ==
A solution containing the analyte, A, in the presence of some conductive buffer. If an electrolytic potential is applied to the solution through a working electrode, then the measured current depends (in part) on the concentration of the analyte. Measurement of this current can be used to determine the concentration of the analyte directly; this is a form of amperometry. However, the difficulty is that the measured current depends on several other variables, and it is not always possible to control all of them adequately. This limits the precision of direct amperometry.

If the potential applied to the working electrode is sufficient to reduce the analyte, then the concentration of analyte close to the working electrode will decrease. More of the analyte will slowly diffuse into the volume of solution close to the working electrode, restoring the concentration. If the potential applied to the working electrode is great enough (an overpotential), then the concentration of analyte next to the working electrode will depend entirely on the rate of diffusion. In such a case, the current is said to be diffusion limited. As the analyte is reduced at the working electrode, the concentration of the analyte in the whole solution will very slowly decrease; this depends on the size of the working electrode compared to the volume of the solution.

What happens if some other species which reacts with the analyte (the titrant) is added? (For instance, chromate ions can be added to oxidize lead ions.) After a small quantity of the titrant (chromate) is added, the concentration of the analyte (lead) has decreased due to the reaction with chromate. The current from the reduction of lead ion at the working electrode will decrease. The addition is repeated, and the current decreases again. A plot of the current against volume of added titrant will be a straight line.

After enough titrant has been added to react completely with the analyte, the excess titrant may itself be reduced at the working electrode. Since this is a different species with different diffusion characteristics (and different half-reaction), the slope of current versus added titrant will have a different slope after the equivalence point. This change in slope marks the equivalence point, in the same way that, for instance, the sudden change in pH marks the equivalence point in an acid–base titration.

The electrode potential may also be chosen such that the titrant is reduced, but the analyte is not. In this case, the presence of excess titrant is easily detected by the increase in current above background (charging) current.

== Advantages ==
The chief advantage over direct amperometry is that the magnitude of the measured current is of interest only as an indicator. Thus, factors that are of critical importance to quantitative amperometry, such as the surface area of the working electrode, completely disappear from amperometric titrations.

The chief advantage over other types of titration is the selectivity offered by the electrode potential, as well as by the choice of titrant. For instance, lead ion is reduced at a potential of -0.60 V (relative to the saturated calomel electrode), while zinc ions are not; this allows the determination of lead in the presence of zinc. Clearly this advantage depends entirely on the other species present in the sample.

== See also ==
- Titration
