= Titration curve =

Graph in acid-base chemistry

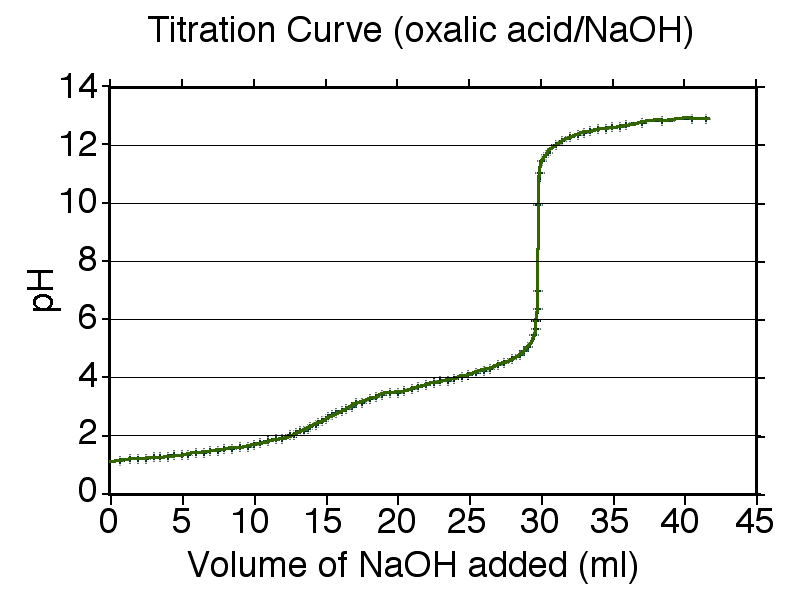
A typical titration curve of a diprotic acid, oxalic acid, titrated with a strong base, sodium hydroxide. Both equivalence points are visible.

Titrations are often recorded on graphs called titration curves, which generally contain the volume of the titrant as the independent variable and the pH of the solution as the dependent variable (because it changes depending on the composition of the two solutions).

The equivalence point on the graph is where all of the starting solution (usually an acid) has been neutralized by the titrant (usually a base). It can be calculated precisely by finding the second derivative of the titration curve and computing the points of inflection (where the graph changes concavity); however, in most cases, simple visual inspection of the curve will suffice. In the curve given to the right, both equivalence points are visible, after roughly 15 and 30 mL of NaOH solution has been titrated into the oxalic acid solution. To calculate the logarithmic acid dissociation constant (pK_{a}), one must find the volume at the half-equivalence point, that is where half the amount of titrant has been added to form the next compound (here, sodium hydrogen oxalate, then disodium oxalate). Halfway between each equivalence point, at 7.5 mL and 22.5 mL, the pH observed was about 1.5 and 4, giving the pK_{a}.

In weak monoprotic acids, the point halfway between the beginning of the curve (before any titrant has been added) and the equivalence point is significant: at that point, the concentrations of the two species (the acid and conjugate base) are equal. Therefore, the Henderson-Hasselbalch equation can be solved in this manner:

$$\mathrm{pH} = \mathrm pK_{\mathrm a} + \log \left( \frac{[\mbox{base}]}{[\mbox{acid}]} \right)$$
$$\mathrm{pH} = \mathrm pK_{\mathrm a} + \log(1)\,$$
$$\mathrm{pH} = \mathrm pK_{\mathrm a} \,$$

Therefore, one can easily find the pK_{a} of the weak monoprotic acid by finding the pH of the point halfway between the beginning of the curve and the equivalence point, and solving the simplified equation. In the case of the sample curve, the acid dissociation constant K_{a} = 10^{-pKa} would be approximately 1.78×10^{−5} from visual inspection (the actual K_{a2} is 1.7×10^{−5})

For polyprotic acids, calculating the acid dissociation constants is only marginally more difficult: the first acid dissociation constant can be calculated the same way as it would be calculated in a monoprotic acid. The pK_{a} of the second acid dissociation constant, however, is the pH at the point halfway between the first equivalence point and the second equivalence point (and so on for acids that release more than two protons, such as phosphoric acid).
