= Titration =

Laboratory method for determining the concentration of an analyte

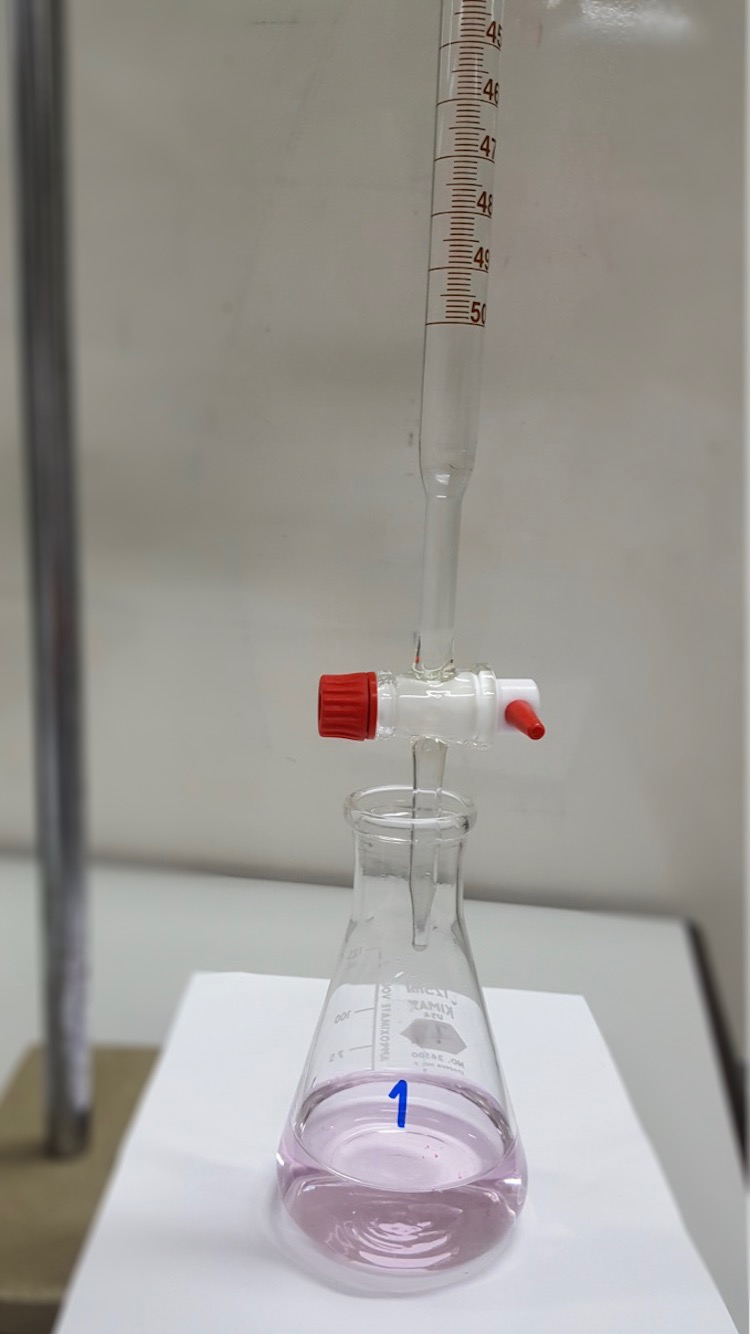
A burette and Erlenmeyer flask (conical flask) being used for an acid–base titration.

Titration (also known as titrimetry and volumetric analysis) is a common laboratory method of quantitative chemical analysis to determine the concentration of an identified analyte (a substance to be analyzed). A reagent, termed the titrant or titrator, is prepared as a standard solution of known concentration and volume. The titrant reacts with a solution of analyte (which may also be termed the titrand) to determine the analyte's concentration. The volume of titrant that reacted with the analyte is termed the titration volume.

== History and etymology ==
The word "titration" descends from the French word tiltre (1543), meaning the proportion of gold or silver in coins or in works of gold or silver; i.e., a measure of fineness or purity. Tiltre became titre, which thus came to mean the "fineness of alloyed gold", and then the "concentration of a substance in a given sample". In 1828, the French chemist Joseph Louis Gay-Lussac first used titre as a verb (titrer), meaning "to determine the concentration of a substance in a given sample".

Volumetric analysis originated in late 18th-century France. French chemist François-Antoine-Henri Descroizilles developed the first burette (which was similar to a graduated cylinder) in 1791. Gay-Lussac developed an improved version of the burette that included a side arm, and invented the terms "pipette" and "burette" in an 1824 paper on the standardization of indigo solutions. The first true burette was invented in 1845 by the French chemist Étienne-Ossian Henry (1798–1873). A major improvement of the method and popularization of volumetric analysis was due to Karl Friedrich Mohr, who redesigned the burette into a simple and convenient form, and who wrote the first textbook on the topic, Lehrbuch der chemisch-analytischen Titrirmethode (Textbook of analytical chemistry titration methods), published in 1855.

== Procedure ==
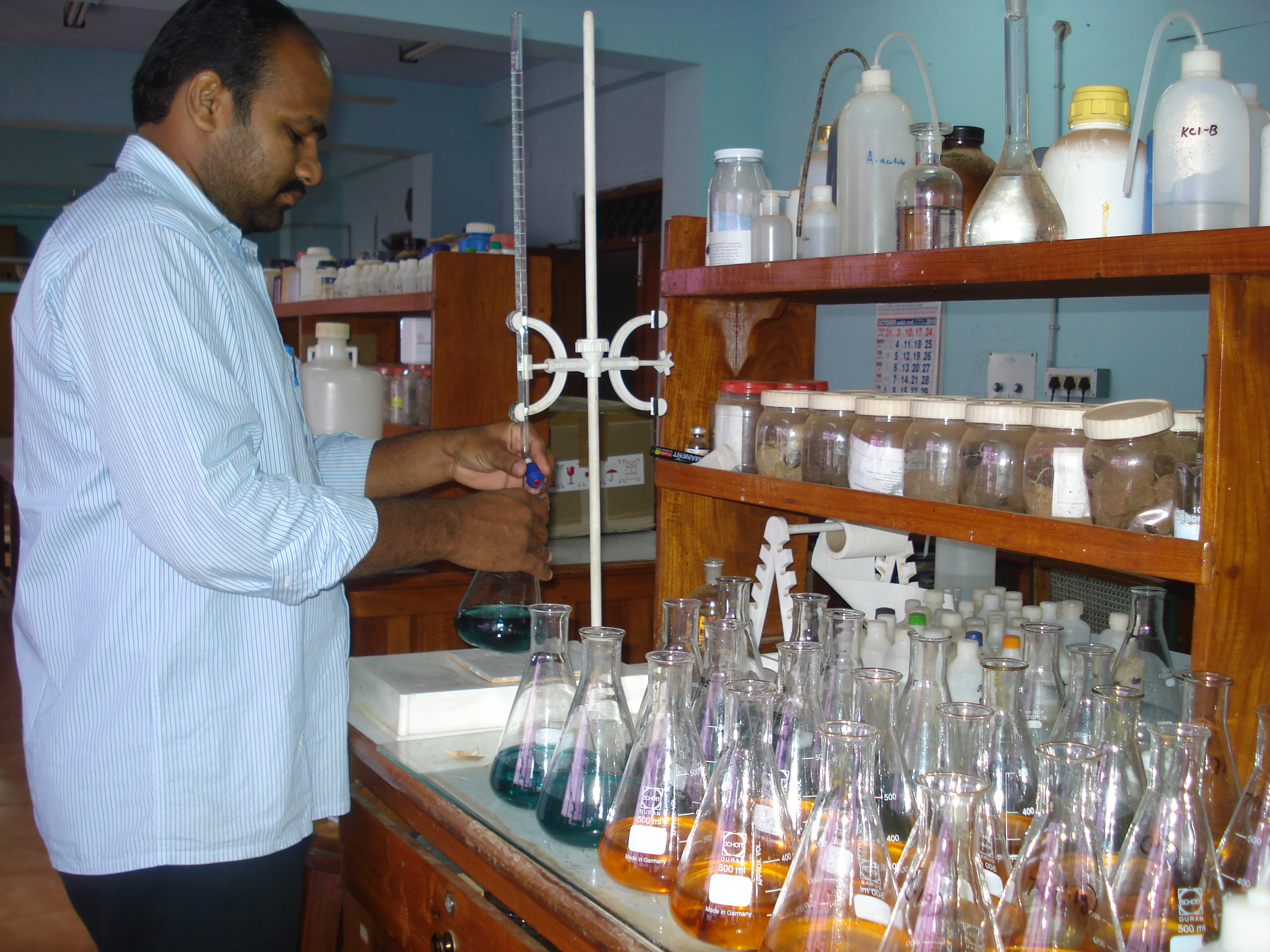
Analysis of soil samples by titration.

A typical titration begins with a beaker or Erlenmeyer flask containing a very precise amount of the analyte and a small amount of indicator (such as phenolphthalein) placed underneath a calibrated burette or chemistry pipetting syringe containing the titrant. Small volumes of the titrant are then added to the analyte and indicator until the indicator changes color in reaction to the titrant saturation threshold, representing arrival at the endpoint of the titration, meaning the amount of titrant balances the amount of analyte present, according to the reaction between the two. Depending on the endpoint desired, single drops or less than a single drop of the titrant can make the difference between a permanent and temporary change in the indicator. The beaker or flask containing the analyte/indicator solution should be continuously stirred or agitated in order to keep the added titrant uniformly dispersed.

=== Preparation techniques ===
Typical titrations require titrant and analyte to be in a liquid (solution) form. Though solids are usually dissolved into an aqueous solution, other solvents such as glacial acetic acid or ethanol are used for special purposes (as in petrochemistry, which specializes in petroleum.) Concentrated analytes are often diluted to improve accuracy.

Many non-acid–base titrations require a constant pH during the reaction. Therefore, a buffer solution may be added to the titration chamber to maintain the pH.

In instances where two reactants in a sample may react with the titrant and only one is the desired analyte, a separate masking solution may be added to the reaction chamber which eliminates the effect of the unwanted ion.

Some reduction-oxidation (redox) reactions may require heating the sample solution and titrating while the solution is still hot to increase the reaction rate. For instance, the oxidation of some oxalate solutions requires heating to 60 °C (140 °F) to maintain a reasonable rate of reaction.

== Titration curves ==
A typical titration curve of a diprotic acid titrated with a strong base. Shown here is oxalic acid titrated with sodium hydroxide. Both equivalence points are visible.

A titration curve is a curve in the graph the x-coordinate of which represents the volume of titrant added since the beginning of the titration, and the y-coordinate of which represents the concentration of the analyte at the corresponding stage of the titration (in an acid–base titration, the y-coordinate usually represents the pH of the solution).

In an acid–base titration, the titration curve represents the strength of the corresponding acid and base. For a strong acid and a strong base, the curve will be relatively smooth and very steep near the equivalence point. Because of this, a small change in titrant volume near the equivalence point results in a large pH change, and many indicators would be appropriate (for instance litmus, phenolphthalein or bromothymol blue).

If one reagent is a weak acid or base and the other is a strong acid or base, the titration curve is irregular and the pH shifts less with small additions of titrant near the equivalence point. For example, the titration curve for the titration between oxalic acid (a weak acid) and sodium hydroxide (a strong base) is pictured. The equivalence point occurs between pH 8-10, indicating the solution is basic at the equivalence point and an indicator such as phenolphthalein would be appropriate. Titration curves corresponding to weak bases and strong acids are similarly behaved, with the solution being acidic at the equivalence point and indicators such as methyl orange and bromothymol blue being most appropriate.

Titrations between a weak acid and a weak base have titration curves which are very irregular. Because of this, no definite indicator may be appropriate, and a pH meter is often used to monitor the reaction.

The type of function that can be used to describe the curve is termed a sigmoid function.

== Types of titrations ==
There are many types of titrations with different procedures and goals. The most common types of qualitative titration are acid–base titrations and redox titrations.

=== Acid–base titration ===
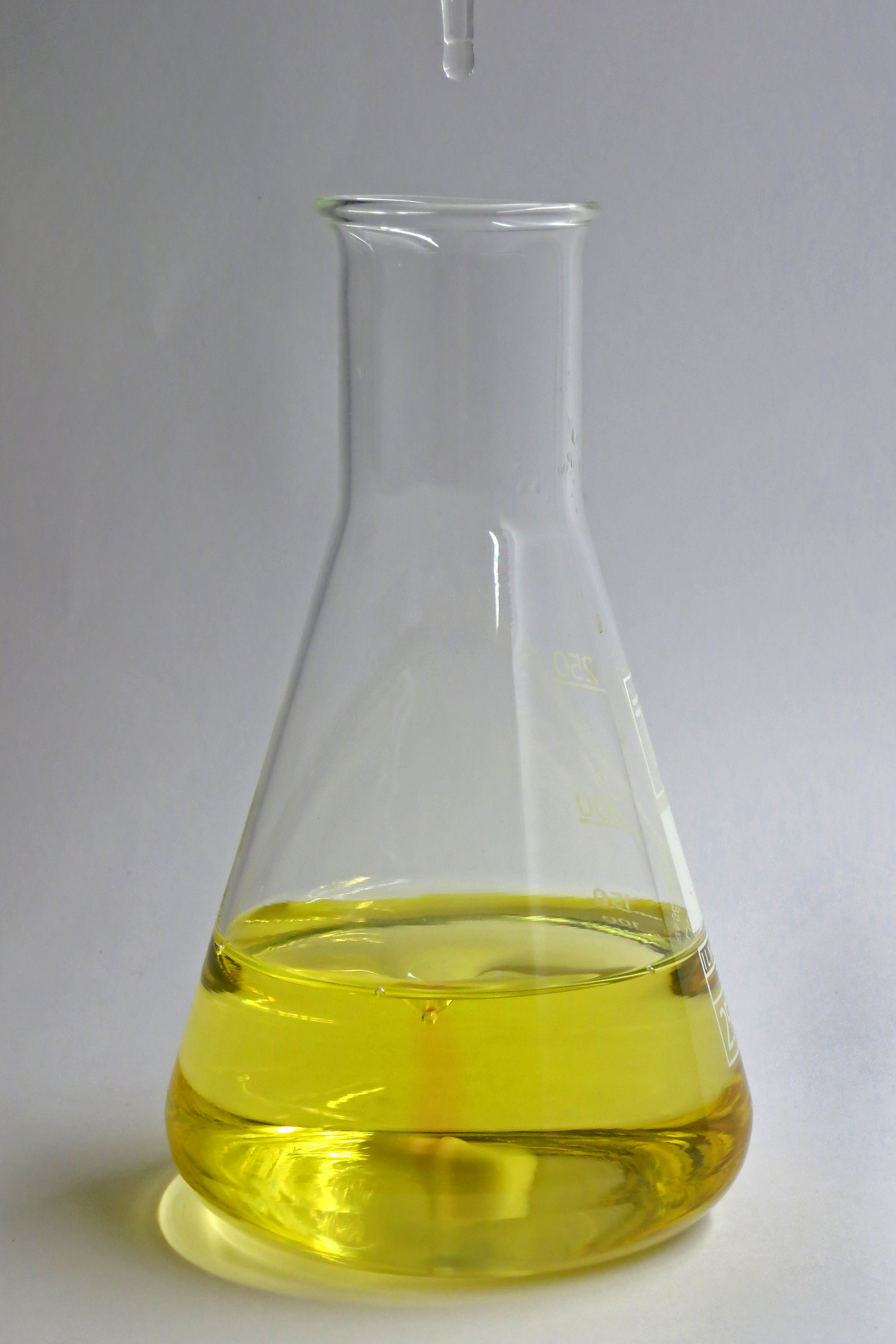
Methyl orange

Indicator	Color on acidic side	Range of color change (pH)	Color on basic side
Methyl violet	Yellow	0.0—1.6	Violet
Bromophenol blue	Yellow	3.0—4.6	Blue
Methyl orange	Red	3.1—4.4	Yellow
Methyl red	Red	4.4—6.3	Yellow
Litmus	Red	5.0—8.0	Blue
Bromothymol blue	Yellow	6.0—7.6	Blue
Phenolphthalein	Colorless	8.3—10.0	Pink
Alizarin yellow	Yellow	10.1—12.0	Red

Acid–base titrations depend on the neutralization between an acid and a base when mixed in solution. In addition to the sample, an appropriate pH indicator is added to the titration chamber, representing the pH range of the equivalence point. The acid–base indicator indicates the endpoint of the titration by changing color. The endpoint and the equivalence point are not exactly the same because the equivalence point is determined by the stoichiometry of the reaction while the endpoint is just the color change from the indicator. Thus, a careful selection of the indicator will reduce the indicator error. For example, if the equivalence point is at a pH of 8.4, then the phenolphthalein indicator would be used instead of Alizarin Yellow because phenolphthalein would reduce the indicator error. Common indicators, their colors, and the pH range in which they change color are given in the table above. When more precise results are required, or when the reagents are a weak acid and a weak base, a pH meter or a conductance meter are used.

For very strong bases, such as organolithium reagent, metal amides, and hydrides, water is generally not a suitable solvent and indicators whose pKa are in the range of aqueous pH changes are of little use. Instead, the titrant and indicator used are much weaker acids, and anhydrous solvents such as THF are used.

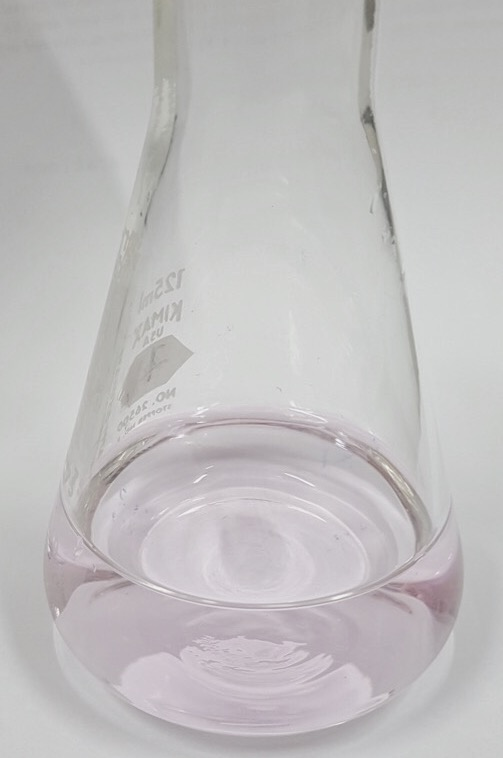
Phenolphthalein, a commonly used indicator in acid and base titration.

The approximate pH during titration can be approximated by three kinds of calculations. Before beginning of titration, the concentration of $\ce{[H+]}$ is calculated in an aqueous solution of weak acid before adding any base. When the number of moles of bases added equals the number of moles of initial acid or so called equivalence point, one of hydrolysis and the pH is calculated in the same way that the conjugate bases of the acid titrated was calculated. Between starting and end points, $\ce{[H+]}$ is obtained from the Henderson-Hasselbalch equation and titration mixture is considered as buffer. In Henderson-Hasselbalch equation the [acid] and [base] are said to be the molarities that would have been present even with dissociation or hydrolysis. In a buffer, $\ce{[H+]}$ can be calculated exactly but the dissociation of HA, the hydrolysis of $\ce{A-}$ and self-ionization of water must be taken into account. Four independent equations must be used:

$$[\ce{H+}][\ce{OH-}] = 10^{-14}$$
$$[\ce{H+}] = K_a\ce{\frac{[HA]}{[A^{-}]}}$$
$$[\ce{HA}] + [\ce{A-}] = \frac{(n_\ce{A} + n_\ce{B})}{V}$$
$$[\ce{H+}]  + \frac{n_\ce{B}}{V} = [\ce{A-}] + [\ce{OH-}]$$

In the equations, $n_\ce{A}$ and $n_\ce{B}$ are the moles of acid (HA) and salt (XA where X is the cation), respectively, used in the buffer, and the volume of solution is V. The law of mass action is applied to the ionization of water and the dissociation of acid to derived the first and second equations. The mass balance is used in the third equation, where the sum of $V[\ce{HA}]$ and $V[\ce{A-}]$ must equal to the number of moles of dissolved acid and base, respectively. Charge balance is used in the fourth equation, where the left hand side represents the total charge of the cations and the right hand side represents the total charge of the anions: $\frac{n_\ce{B}}{V}$ is the molarity of the cation (e.g. sodium, if sodium salt of the acid or sodium hydroxide is used in making the buffer).

=== Redox titration ===
Redox titrations are based on a reduction-oxidation reaction between an oxidizing agent and a reducing agent. A potentiometer or a redox indicator is usually used to determine the endpoint of the titration, as when one of the constituents is the oxidizing agent potassium dichromate. The color change of the solution from orange to green is not definite, therefore an indicator such as sodium diphenylamine is used. Analysis of wines for sulfur dioxide requires iodine as an oxidizing agent. In this case, starch is used as an indicator; a blue starch-iodine complex is formed in the presence of excess iodine, signalling the endpoint.

Some redox titrations do not require an indicator, due to the intense color of the constituents. For instance, in permanganometry a slight persisting pink color signals the endpoint of the titration because of the color of the excess oxidizing agent potassium permanganate. In iodometry, at sufficiently large concentrations, the disappearance of the deep red-brown triiodide ion can itself be used as an endpoint, though at lower concentrations sensitivity is improved by adding starch indicator, which forms an intensely blue complex with triiodide.

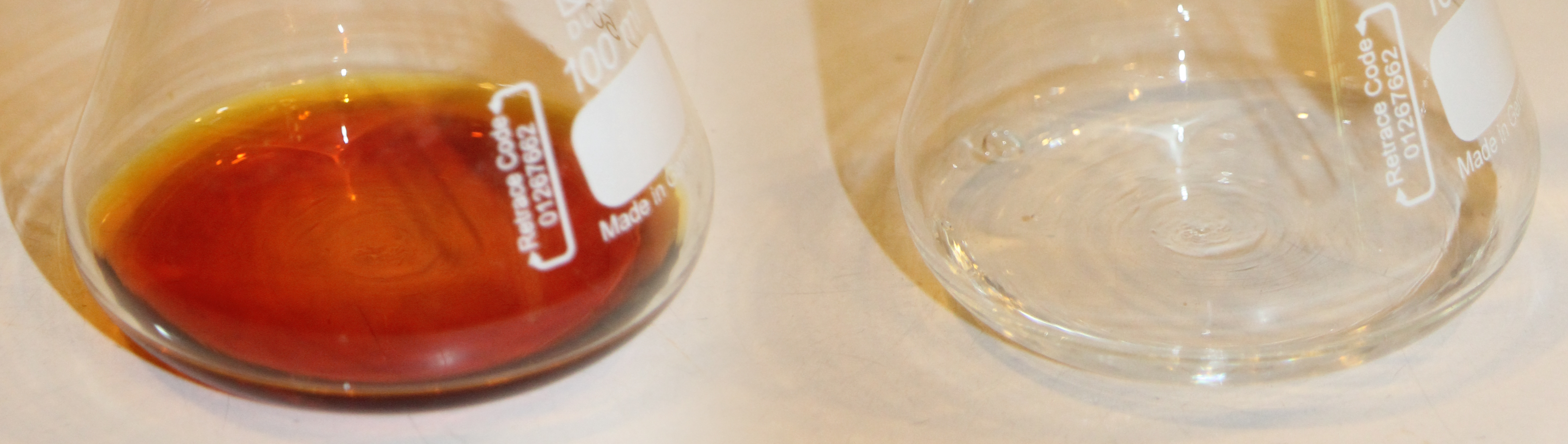
Color of iodometric titration mixture before (left) and after (right) the end point.

=== Gas phase titration ===
Gas phase titrations are titrations done in the gas phase, specifically as methods for determining reactive species by reaction with an excess of some other gas, acting as the titrant. In one common gas phase titration, gaseous ozone is titrated with nitrogen oxide according to the reaction

O_{3} + NO → O_{2} + NO_{2}.

After the reaction is complete, the remaining titrant and product are quantified (e.g., by Fourier transform spectroscopy) (FT-IR); this is used to determine the amount of analyte in the original sample.

Gas phase titration has several advantages over simple spectrophotometry. First, the measurement does not depend on path length, because the same path length is used for the measurement of both the excess titrant and the product. Second, the measurement does not depend on a linear change in absorbance as a function of analyte concentration as defined by the Beer–Lambert law. Third, it is useful for samples containing species which interfere at wavelengths typically used for the analyte.

=== Complexometric titration ===
Complexometric titrations rely on the formation of a complex between the analyte and the titrant. In general, they require specialized complexometric indicators that form weak complexes with the analyte. The most common example is the use of starch indicator to increase the sensitivity of iodometric titration, the dark blue complex of starch with iodine and iodide being more visible than iodine alone. Other complexometric indicators are Eriochrome Black T for the titration of calcium and magnesium ions, and the chelating agent EDTA used to titrate metal ions in solution.

=== Zeta potential titration ===
Zeta potential titrations are titrations in which the completion is monitored by the zeta potential, rather than by an indicator, in order to characterize heterogeneous systems, such as colloids. One of the uses is to determine the iso-electric point when surface charge becomes zero, achieved by changing the pH or adding surfactant. Another use is to determine the optimum dose for flocculation or stabilization.

=== Assay ===
An assay is a type of biological titration used to determine the concentration of a virus or bacterium. Serial dilutions are performed on a sample in a fixed ratio (such as 1:1, 1:2, 1:4, 1:8, etc.) until the last dilution does not give a positive test for the presence of the virus. The positive or negative value may be determined by inspecting the infected cells visually under a microscope or by an immunoenzymetric method such as enzyme-linked immunosorbent assay (ELISA). This value is known as the titer.

== Measuring the endpoint of a titration ==
Different methods to determine the endpoint include:

- Indicator: A substance that changes color in response to a chemical change. An acid–base indicator (e.g., phenolphthalein) changes color depending on the pH. Redox indicators are also used. A drop of indicator solution is added to the titration at the beginning; the endpoint has been reached when the color changes.
- Potentiometer: An instrument that measures the electrode potential of the solution. These are used for redox titrations; the potential of the working electrode will suddenly change as the endpoint is reached.

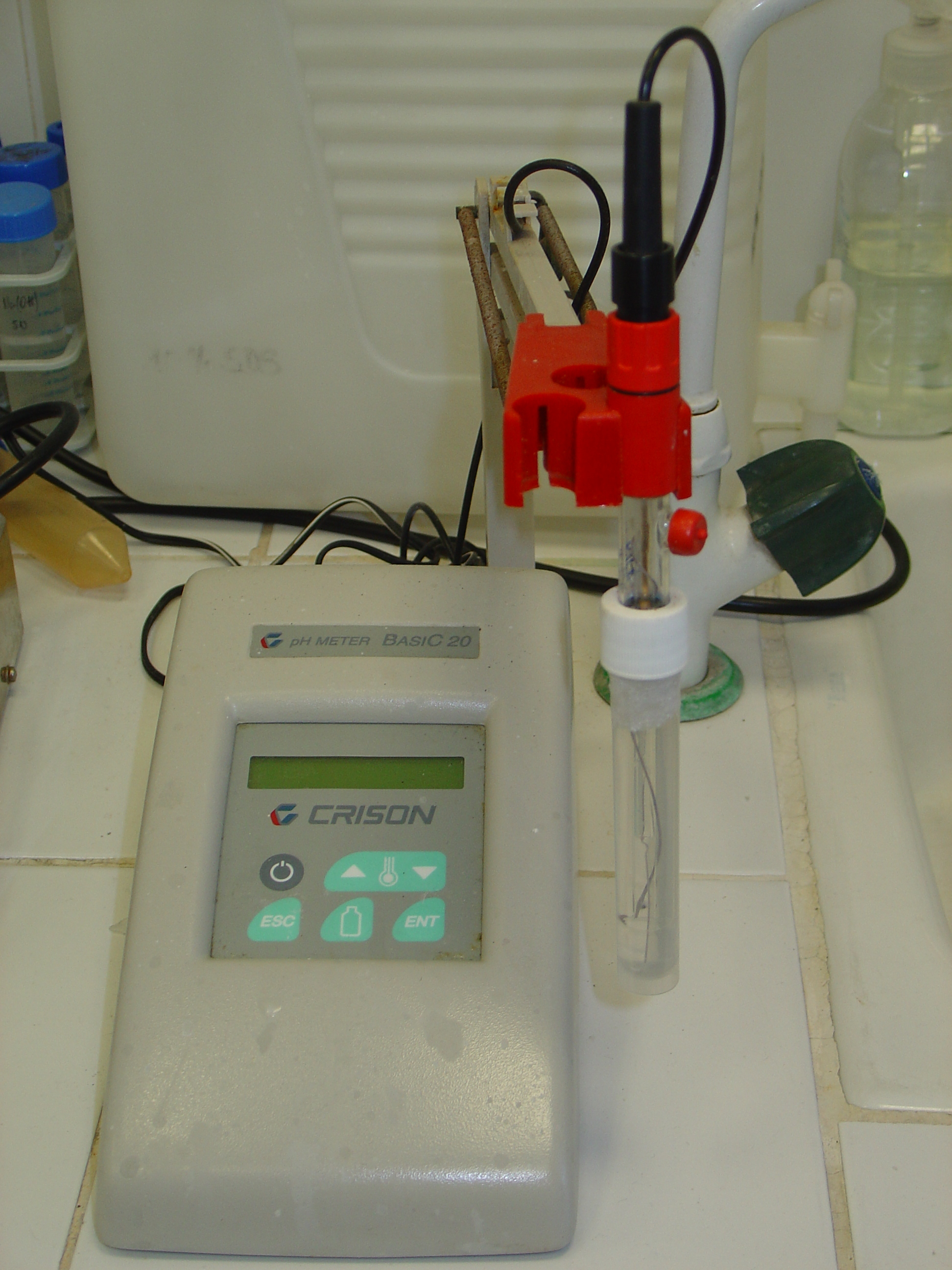
An elementary pH meter that can be used to monitor titration reactions.

- pH meter: A potentiometer with an electrode whose potential depends on the amount of H^{+} ion present in the solution. (This is an example of an ion-selective electrode.) The pH of the solution is measured throughout the titration, more accurately than with an indicator; at the endpoint there will be a sudden change in the measured pH.
- Conductivity: A measurement of ions in a solution. Ion concentration can change significantly in a titration, which changes the conductivity. (For instance, during an acid–base titration, the H^{+} and OH^{−} ions react to form neutral H_{2}O.) As total conductance depends on all ions present in the solution and not all ions contribute equally (due to mobility and ionic strength), predicting the change in conductivity is more difficult than measuring it.
- Color change: In some reactions, the solution changes color without any added indicator. This is often seen in redox titrations when the different oxidation states of the product and reactant produce different colors.
- Precipitation: If a reaction produces a solid, a precipitate will form during the titration. A classic example is the reaction between Ag^{+} and Cl^{−} to form the insoluble salt AgCl. Cloudy precipitates usually make it difficult to determine the endpoint precisely. To compensate, precipitation titrations often have to be done as "back" titrations (see below).
- Isothermal titration calorimeter: An instrument that measures the heat produced or consumed by the reaction to determine the endpoint. Used in biochemical titrations, such as the determination of how substrates bind to enzymes.
- Thermometric titrimetry: Differentiated from calorimetric titrimetry because the heat of the reaction (as indicated by temperature rise or fall) is not used to determine the amount of analyte in the sample solution. Instead, the endpoint is determined by the rate of temperature change.
- Spectroscopy: Used to measure the absorption of light by the solution during titration if the spectrum of the reactant, titrant or product is known. The concentration of the material can be determined by Beer's Law.
- Amperometry: Measures the current produced by the titration reaction as a result of the oxidation or reduction of the analyte. The endpoint is detected as a change in the current. This method is most useful when the excess titrant can be reduced, as in the titration of halides with Ag^{+}.

=== Endpoint and equivalence point ===
Though the terms equivalence point and endpoint are often used interchangeably, they are different terms. Equivalence point is the theoretical completion of the reaction: the volume of added titrant at which the number of moles of titrant is equal to the number of moles of analyte, or some multiple thereof (as in polyprotic acids). Endpoint is what is actually measured, a physical change in the solution as determined by an indicator or an instrument mentioned above.

There is a slight difference between the endpoint and the equivalence point of the titration, such as when the pH at which an acid/base indicator changes color does not exactly equal the pK_{a} of the acid being titrated with a base. This indicator error can be a positive error if the endpoint occurs after the actual equivalence point or a negative error if the endpoint occurs before the equivalence point.

=== Back titration ===
Back titration is a titration done in reverse; instead of titrating the original sample, a known excess of standard reagent is added to the solution, and the excess is titrated. A back titration is useful if the endpoint of the reverse titration is easier to identify than the endpoint of the normal titration, as with precipitation reactions. Back titrations are also useful if the reaction between the analyte and the titrant is very slow, or when the analyte is in a non-soluble solid.

== Graphical methods ==
The titration process creates solutions with compositions ranging from pure acid to pure base. Identifying the pH associated with any stage in the titration process is relatively simple for monoprotic acids and bases. The presence of more than one acid or base group complicates these computations. Graphical methods, such as the equiligraph, have long been used to account for the interaction of coupled equilibria.

== Particular uses ==
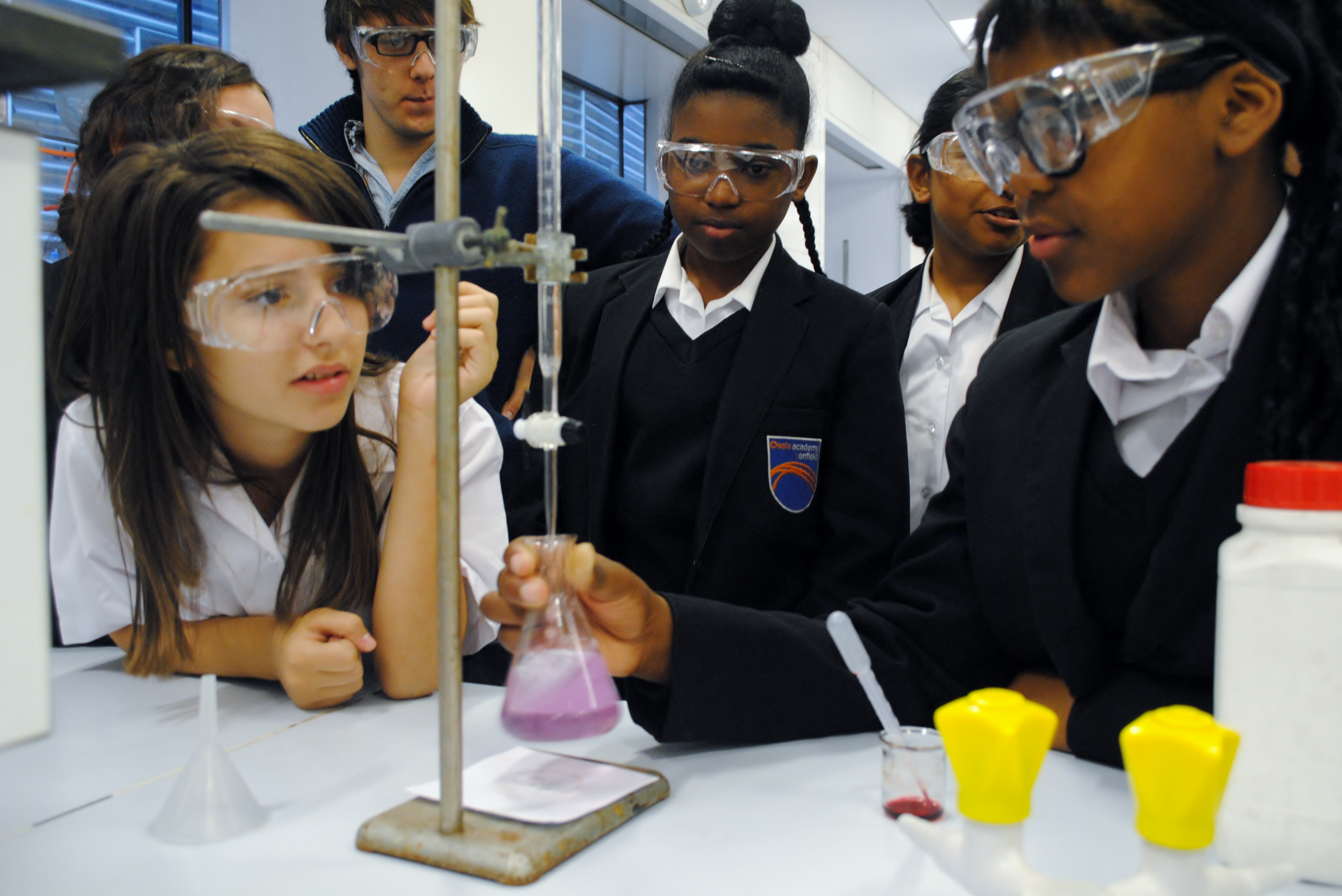
A titration is demonstrated to secondary school students.

=== Acid–base titrations ===
- For biodiesel fuel: waste vegetable oil (WVO) must be neutralized before a batch may be processed. A portion of WVO is titrated with a base to determine acidity, so the rest of the batch may be neutralized properly. This removes free fatty acids from the WVO that would normally react to make soap instead of biodiesel fuel.
- Kjeldahl method: a measure of nitrogen content in a sample. Organic nitrogen is digested into ammonia with sulfuric acid and potassium sulfate. Finally, ammonia is back titrated with boric acid and then sodium carbonate.
- Acid value: the mass in milligrams of potassium hydroxide (KOH) required to titrate fully an acid in one gram of sample. An example is the determination of free fatty acid content.
- Saponification value: the mass in milligrams of KOH required to saponify a fatty acid in one gram of sample. Saponification is used to determine average chain length of fatty acids in fat.
- Ester value (or ester index): a calculated index. Ester value = Saponification value – Acid value.
- Amine value: the mass in milligrams of KOH equal to the amine content in one gram of sample.
- Hydroxyl value: the mass in milligrams of KOH corresponding to hydroxyl groups in one gram of sample. The analyte is acetylated using acetic anhydride then titrated with KOH.
- Acetyl number: the mass in milligrams of KOH equivalent to the acetic acid formed by hydrolysis of one gram of an acetylated sample, used to determine the number of free hydroxyl groups in the substance.

=== Redox titrations ===
- Winkler test for dissolved oxygen: Used to determine oxygen concentration in water. Oxygen in water samples is reduced using manganese(II) sulfate, which reacts with potassium iodide to produce iodine. The iodine is released in proportion to the oxygen in the sample, thus the oxygen concentration is determined with a redox titration of iodine with thiosulfate using a starch indicator.
- Vitamin C: Also known as ascorbic acid, vitamin C is a powerful reducing agent. Its concentration can easily be identified when titrated with the blue dye Dichlorophenolindophenol (DCPIP) which becomes colorless when reduced by the vitamin.
- Benedict's reagent: Excess glucose in urine may indicate diabetes in a patient. Benedict's method is the conventional method to quantify glucose in urine using a prepared reagent. During this type of titration, glucose reduces cupric ions to cuprous ions which react with potassium thiocyanate to produce a white precipitate, indicating the endpoint.
- Bromine number: A measure of unsaturation in an analyte, expressed in milligrams of bromine absorbed by 100 grams of sample.
- Iodine number: A measure of unsaturation in an analyte, expressed in grams of iodine absorbed by 100 grams of sample.

=== Miscellaneous ===
- Karl Fischer titration: A potentiometric method to analyze trace amounts of water in a substance. A sample is dissolved in methanol, and titrated with Karl Fischer reagent (consists of iodine, sulfur dioxide, a base and a solvent, such as alcohol). The reagent contains iodine, which reacts proportionally with water. Thus, the water content can be determined by monitoring the electric potential of excess iodine.

== See also ==
- Primary standards are compounds with consistent and reliable properties used to prepare standard solutions for titrations.
