= Equivalence point =

Particular ratio of chemical reactants

The equivalence point, or stoichiometric point, of a chemical reaction is the point at which chemically equivalent quantities of reactants have been mixed. For an acid-base reaction, the equivalence point is where the moles of acid and the moles of base would neutralize each other according to the chemical reaction. This does not necessarily imply a 1:1 molar ratio of acid:base, merely that the ratio is the same as the ratio in the chemical reaction. It can be found by means of an indicator, such as phenolphthalein or methyl orange.

The endpoint refers to the point at which the indicator changes color in a colorimetric titration. The endpoint is related to the equivalence point, but they will not necessarily be the same.

== Methods to determine the equivalence point ==
Different methods to determine the equivalence point include:

=== pH indicator ===
A pH indicator is a substance that changes color in response to a chemical change. An acid-base indicator, such as phenolphthalein, changes color depending on the pH. Redox indicators are also frequently used. A drop of indicator solution is added to the titration at the start; when the color changes, the endpoint has been reached. This is an approximation of the equivalence point.

=== Conductance ===
The conductivity of a solution depends on the ions that are present in it. During many titrations, the conductivity changes significantly. For instance, during an acid-base titration, the H_{3}O^{+} and OH^{−} ions react to form neutral H_{2}O. This changes the conductivity of the solution. The total conductance of the solution also depends on the other ions present in the solution (such as counter ions). Not all ions contribute equally to the conductivity; this also depends on the mobility of each ion and on the total concentration of ions (ionic strength). Thus, predicting the change in conductivity is harder than measuring it.

=== Color change ===
In some reactions, the solution changes color without any added indicator. This is often seen in redox titrations, for instance, when the different oxidation states of the product and reactant produce different colors.

=== Precipitation ===
If the reaction forms a solid, then a precipitate will form during the titration. A classic example is the reaction between Ag^{+} and Cl^{−} to form the very insoluble salt AgCl. However, this usually makes it difficult to determine the endpoint precisely. As a result, precipitation titrations often have to be done as back titrations.

=== Isothermal titration calorimeter ===
An isothermal titration calorimeter uses the heat produced or consumed by the reaction to determine the equivalence point. This is important in biochemical titrations, such as the determination of how substrates bind to enzymes.

=== Thermometric titrimetry ===
Thermometric titrimetry is an extraordinarily versatile technique. This is differentiated from calorimetric titrimetry by the fact that the heat of the reaction (as indicated by temperature rise or fall) is not used to determine the amount of analyte in the sample solution. Instead, the equivalence point is determined by the rate of temperature change. Because thermometric titrimetry is a relative technique, it is not necessary to conduct the titration under isothermal conditions, and titrations can be conducted in plastic or even glass vessels, although these vessels are generally enclosed to prevent stray draughts from causing "noise" and disturbing the endpoint. Because thermometric titrations can be conducted under ambient conditions, they are especially well-suited to routine process and quality control in industry. Depending on whether the reaction between the titrant and analyte is exothermic or endothermic, the temperature will either rise or fall during the titration. When all analyte has been consumed by reaction with the titrant, a change in the rate of temperature increase or decrease reveals the equivalence point and an inflection in the temperature curve can be observed. The equivalence point can be located precisely by employing the second derivative of the temperature curve. The software used in modern automated thermometric titration systems employ sophisticated digital smoothing algorithms so that "noise" resulting from the highly sensitive temperature probes does not interfere with the generation of a smooth, symmetrical second derivative "peak" which defines the endpoint. The technique is capable of very high precision, and coefficients of variance (CV's) of less than 0.1 are common. Modern thermometric titration temperature probes consist of a thermistor which forms one arm of a Wheatstone bridge. Coupled to high resolution electronics, the best thermometric titration systems can resolve temperatures to 10^{−5}K. Sharp equivalence points have been obtained in titrations where the temperature change during the titration has been as little as 0.001K. The technique can be applied to essentially any chemical reaction in a fluid where there is an enthalpy change, although reaction kinetics can play a role in determining the sharpness of the endpoint. Thermometric titrimetry has been successfully applied to acid-base, redox, EDTA, and precipitation titrations. Examples of successful precipitation titrations are sulfate by titration with barium ions, phosphate by titration with magnesium in ammoniacal solution, chloride by titration with silver nitrate, nickel by titration with dimethylglyoxime, and fluoride by titration with aluminium (as K_{2}NaAlF_{6}) Because the temperature probe does not need to be electrically connected to the solution (as in potentiometric titration), non-aqueous titrations can be carried out as easily as aqueous titrations. Solutions which are highly colored or turbid (cloudy) can be analyzed by thermometric without further sample treatment. The probe is essentially maintenance-free. Using modern, high precision stepper motor driven burettes, automated thermometric titrations are usually complete in a few minutes, making the technique an ideal choice where high laboratory productivity is required.

=== Spectroscopy ===
Spectroscopy can be used to measure the absorption of light by the solution during the titration if the spectrum of the reactant, titrant, or product is known. The relative amounts of the product and reactant can be used to determine the equivalence point. Alternatively, the presence of free titrant (indicating that the reaction is complete) can be detected at very low levels. An example of robust endpoint detectors for etching of semiconductors is EPD-6, a system probing reactions at up to six different wavelengths.

=== Amperometry ===
Amperometry can be used as a detection technique (amperometric titration). The current due to the oxidation or reduction of either the reactants or products at a working electrode will depend on the concentration of that species in solution. The equivalence point can then be detected as a change in the current. This method is most useful when the excess titrant can be reduced, as in the titration of halides with Ag^{+}. (This is also useful because it ignores precipitates.)

== See also ==
- Outline of chemistry
- Inflection point
- Isoelectric point
