= Acid–base titration =

Method of chemical quantitative analysis

The endpoint of an acid–base titration is reached as the indicator suddenly changes colour.

An acid–base titration is a method of quantitative analysis for determining the concentration of Brønsted–Lowry acid or base (titrate) by neutralizing it using a solution of known concentration (titrant). A pH indicator is used to monitor the progress of the acid–base reaction and a titration curve can be constructed.

This differs from other modern modes of titrations, such as oxidation-reduction titrations, precipitation titrations, and complexometric titrations. Although these types of titrations are also used to determine unknown amounts of substances, these substances vary from ions to metals.

Acid–base titration finds extensive applications in various scientific fields, such as pharmaceuticals, environmental monitoring, and quality control in industries. This method's precision and simplicity makes it an important tool in quantitative chemical analysis, contributing significantly to the general understanding of solution chemistry.

== History ==
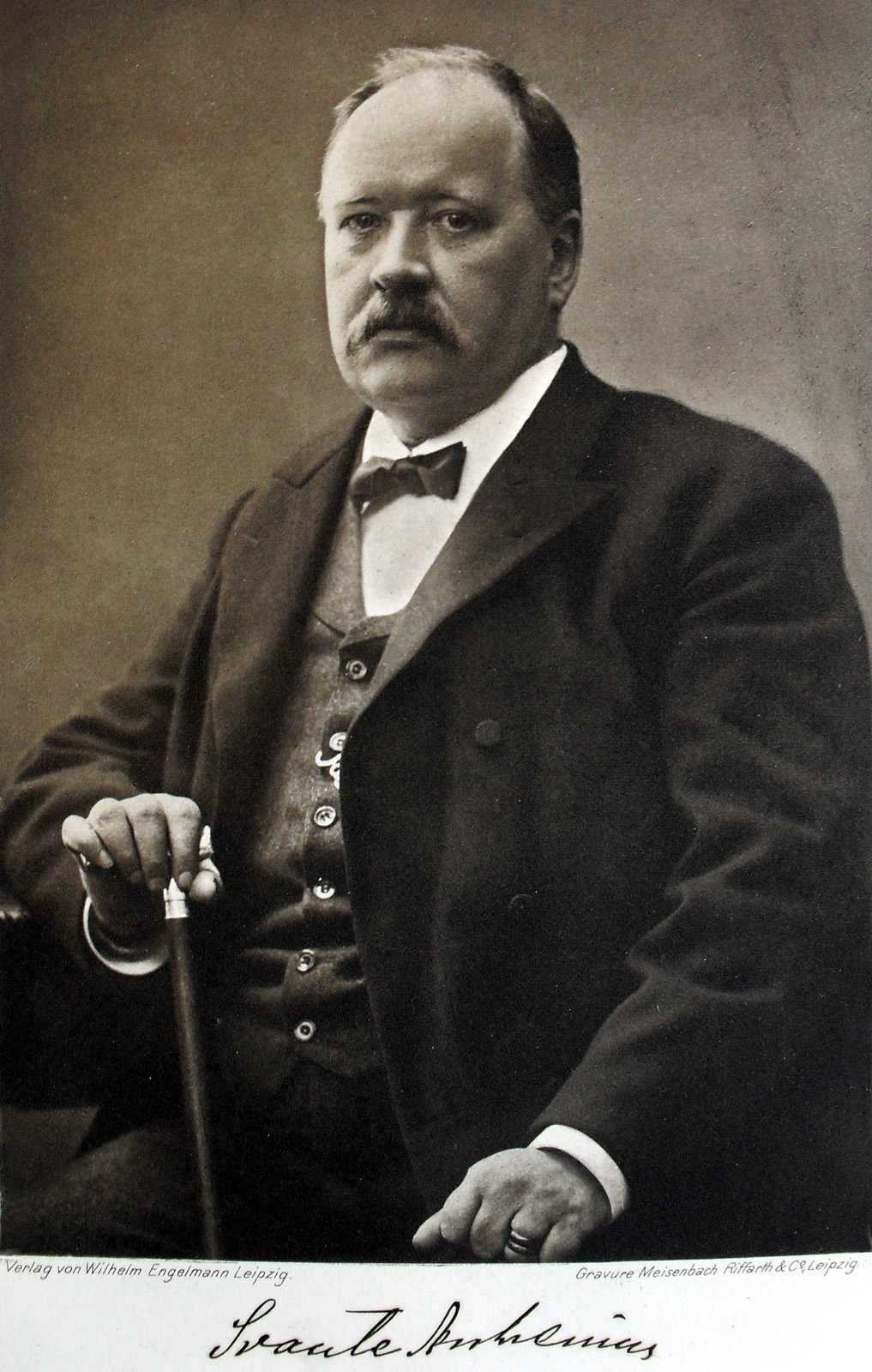
Svante Arrhenius

The history of acid-base titration dates back to the late 19th century when advancements in analytical chemistry fostered the development of systematic techniques for quantitative analysis. The origins of titration methods can be linked to the work of chemists such as Karl Friedrich Mohr in the mid-1800s. His contributions laid the groundwork for understanding titrations involving acids and bases.

Theoretical progress came with the research of Swedish chemist Svante Arrhenius, who in the late 19th century, introduced the Arrhenius theory, providing a theoretical framework for acid-base reactions. This theoretical foundation, along with ongoing experimental refinements, contributed to the evolution of acid-base titration as a precise and widely applicable analytical method.

Over time, the method has undergone further refinements and adaptations, establishing itself as an essential tool in laboratories across various scientific disciplines.

== Alkalimetry and acidimetry ==
Alkalimetry and acidimetry are types of volumetric analyses in which the fundamental reaction is a neutralization reaction. They involve the controlled addition of either an acid or a base (titrant) of known concentration to the solution of the unknown concentration (titrate) until the reaction reaches its stoichiometric equivalence point. At this point, the moles of acid and base are equal, resulting in a neutral solution:

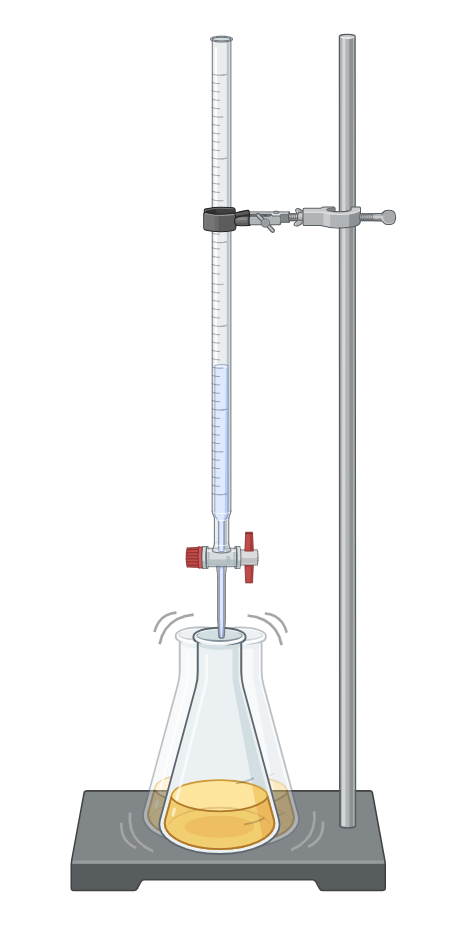
Titration of a standard solution using methyl orange indicator. Titrate is in Erlenmeyer flask, titrant is in burette.

acid + base → salt + water

For example:

HCl + NaOH → NaCl + H_{2}O

Acidimetry is the specialized analytical use of acid-base titration to determine the concentration of a basic (alkaline) substance using standard acid. This can be used for weak bases and strong bases. An example of an acidimetric titration involving a strong base is as follows:

Ba(OH)_{2} + 2 H^{+} → Ba^{2+} + 2 H_{2}O

In this case, the strong base (Ba(OH)_{2}) is neutralized by the acid until all of the base has reacted. This allows the viewer to calculate the concentration of the base from the volume of the standard acid that is used.

Alkalimetry follows uses same concept of specialized analytic acid-base titration, but to determine the concentration of an acidic substance using standard base. An example of an alkalimetric titration involving a strong acid is as follows:

H_{2}SO_{4} + 2 OH^{−} → SO_{4}^{2-} + 2 H_{2}O

In this case, the strong acid (H_{2}SO_{4}) is neutralized by the base until all of the acid has reacted. This allows the viewer to calculate the concentration of the acid from the volume of the standard base that is used.

The standard solution (titrant) is stored in the burette, while the solution of unknown concentration (analyte/titrate) is placed in the Erlenmeyer flask below it with an indicator.

== Indicator choice ==
A suitable pH indicator must be chosen in order to detect the end point of the titration. The colour change or other effect should occur close to the equivalence point of the reaction so that the experimenter can accurately determine when that point is reached. The pH of the equivalence point can be estimated using the following rules:

- A strong acid will react with a strong base to form a neutral (pH = 7) solution.
- A strong acid will react with a weak base to form an acidic (pH < 7) solution.
- A weak acid will react with a strong base to form a basic (pH > 7) solution.

These indicators are essential tools in chemistry and biology, aiding in the determination of a solution's acidity or alkalinity through the observation of colour transitions. The table below serves as a reference guide for these indicator choices, offering insights into the pH ranges and colour transformations associated with specific indicators:

Titration indicator table
Indicator name	Indicator colour	Transition interval (pH range)	Color after high pH conditions
Methyl Orange	Orange/red	3.1 - 4.4	Yellow
Methyl Red	Red	4.4 - 6.3	Yellow
Congo Red	Blue	3.0 - 5.2	Red
Phenolphthalein	Colourless	8.3 - 10.0	Pink
Thymolphthalein	Colourless	9.3 - 10.5	Blue
Bromophenol Blue	Yellow	3.0 - 4.6	Blue
Bromocresol Green	Yellow	3.8 - 5.6	Blue
Thymol Blue	Red	1.2 - 2.8; 8.0 - 9.6	Blue
Cresol Red	Yellow	7.2 - 8.8	Violet
Neutral Red	Red	6.8 - 8.0	Yellow

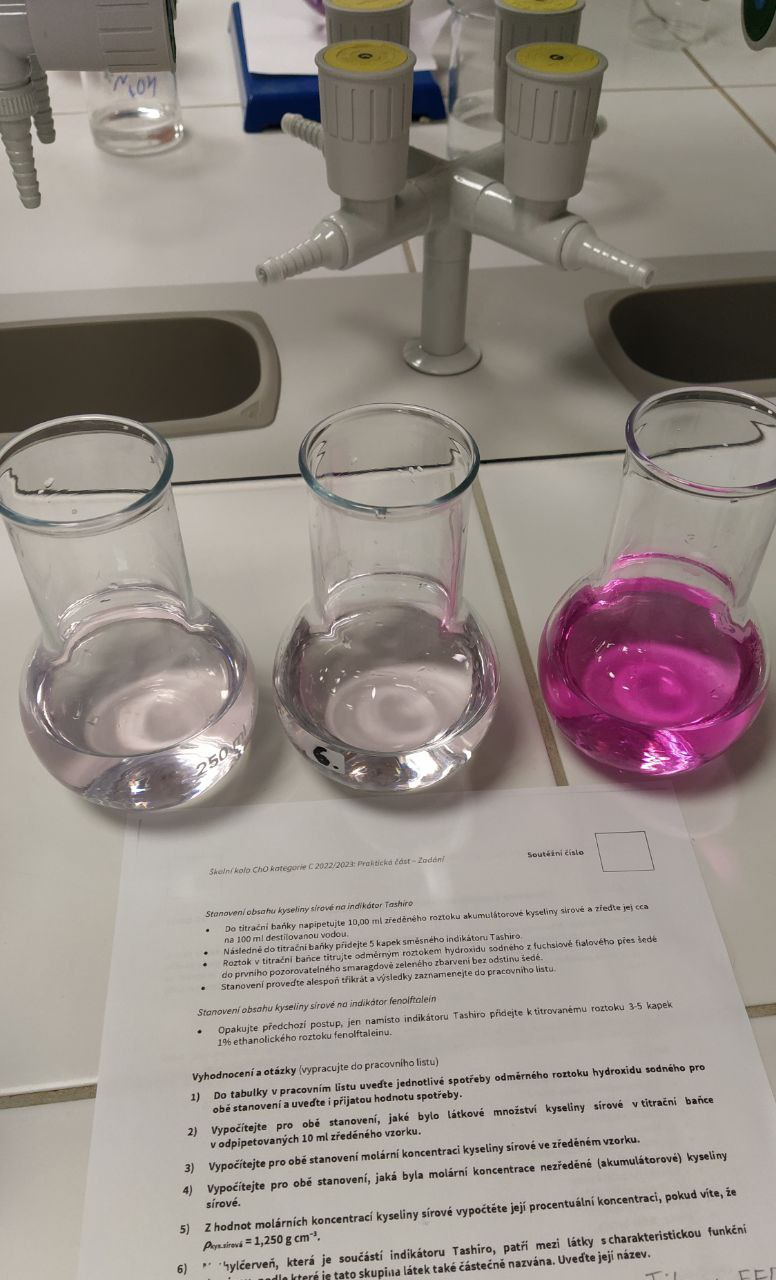
Three different points in an acid-base titration using phenolphthalein as the indicator

Phenolphthalein is widely recognized as one of the most commonly used acid-base indicators in chemistry. Its popularity is because of its effectiveness in a broad pH range and its distinct colour transitions. Its sharp and easily detectable colour changes makes phenolphthalein a valuable tool for determining the endpoint of acid-base titrations, as a precise pH change signifies the completion of the reaction.

When a weak acid reacts with a weak base, the equivalence point solution will be basic if the base is stronger and acidic if the acid is stronger. If both are of equal strength, then the equivalence pH will be neutral. However, weak acids are not often titrated against weak bases because the colour change shown with the indicator is often quick, and therefore very difficult for the observer to see the change of colour.

The point at which the indicator changes colour is called the endpoint. A suitable indicator should be chosen, preferably one that will experience a change in colour (an endpoint) close to the equivalence point of the reaction.

In addition to the wide variety of indicator solutions, pH papers, crafted from paper or plastic infused with combinations of these indicators, serve as a practical alternative. The pH of a solution can be estimated by immersing a strip of pH paper into it and matching the observed colour to the reference standards provided on the container.

== Overshot titration ==
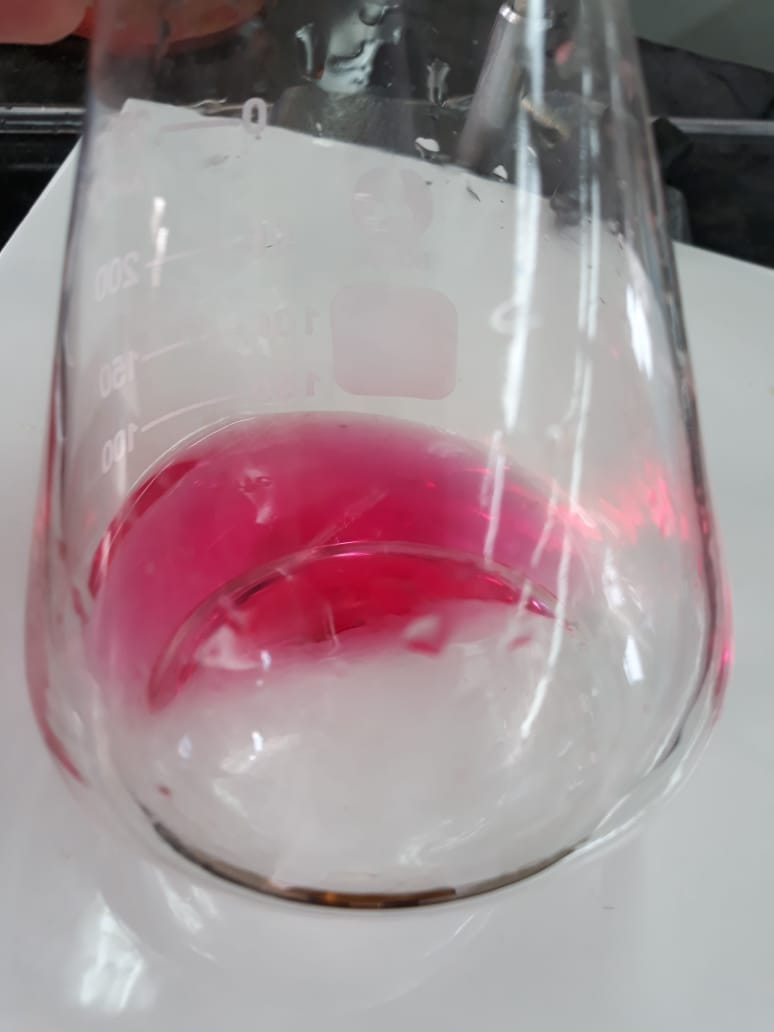
An overshot titration using phenolphthalein indicator

Overshot titrations are a common phenomenon, and refer to a situation where the volume of titrant added during a chemical titration exceeds the amount required to reach the equivalence point. This excess titrant leads to an outcome where the solution becomes slightly more alkaline or over-acidified.

Overshooting the equivalence point can occur due to various factors, such as errors in burette readings, imperfect reaction stoichiometry, or issues with endpoint detection. The consequences of overshot titrations can affect the accuracy of the analytical results, particularly in quantitative analysis.

Researchers and analysts often employ corrective measures, such as back-titration and using more precise titration techniques, to mitigate the impact of overshooting and obtain reliable and precise measurements. Understanding the causes, consequences, and solutions related to overshot titrations is crucial in achieving accurate and reproducible results in the field of chemistry.

== Mathematical analysis: titration of weak acid ==
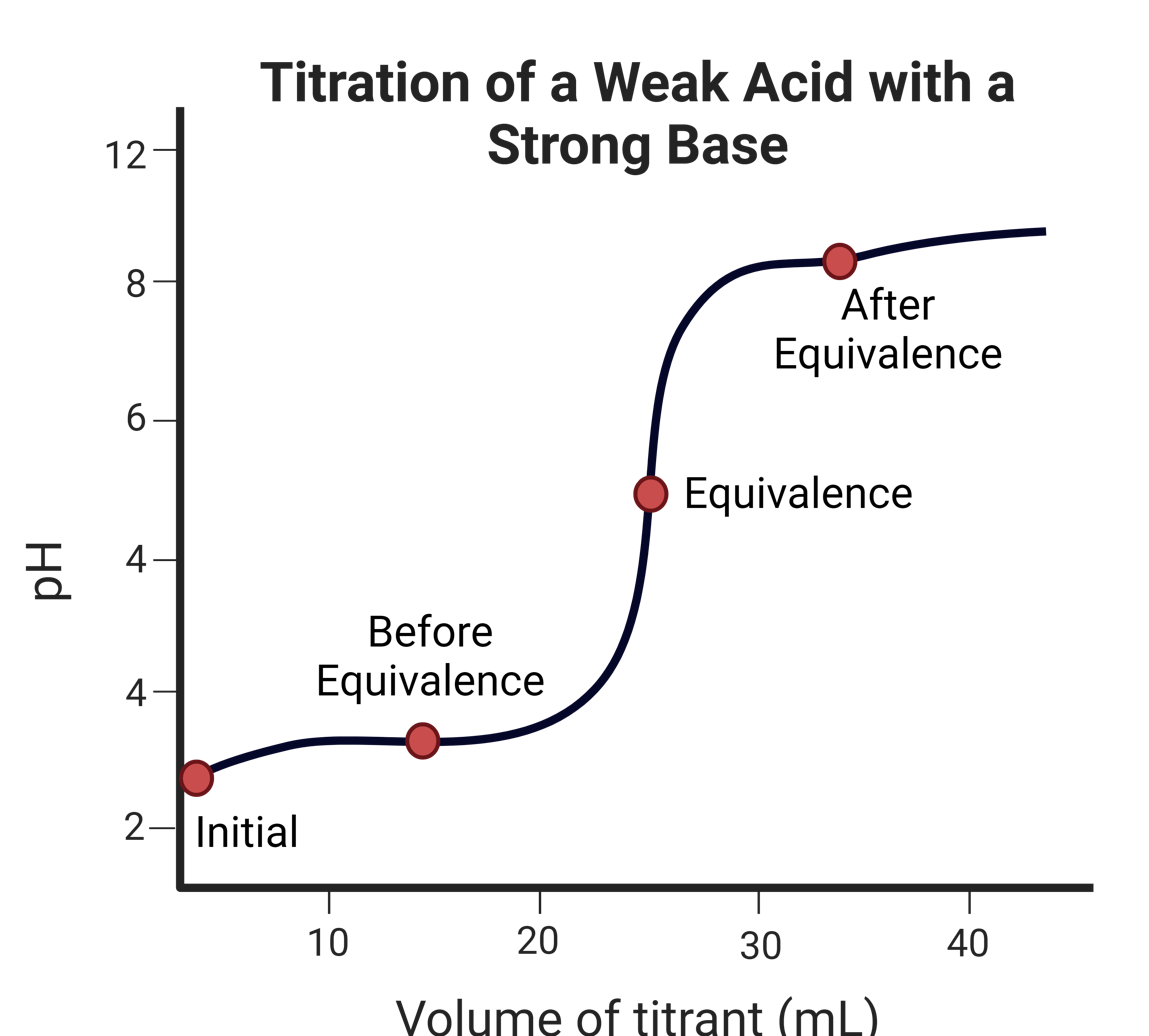
Titration of a weak acid with a strong base showing pH level, volume of titrant, and different points throughout the titration process

For calculating concentrations, an ICE table can be used. ICE stands for initial, change, and equilibrium.

The pH of a weak acid solution being titrated with a strong base solution can be found at different points along the way. These points fall into one of four categories:

1. initial pH
2. pH before the equivalence point
3. pH at the equivalence point
4. pH after the equivalence point

1. The initial pH is approximated for a weak acid solution in water using the equation:

$\ce{pH} =-\log[\ce{H3O+}]_0$ where $\ce{[H3O+]0}$ is the initial concentration of the hydronium ion.

2. The pH before the equivalence point depends on the amount of weak acid remaining and the amount of conjugate base formed. The pH can be calculated approximately by the Henderson–Hasselbalch equation:$\ce{pH} = -\log K_a +\log \frac\text{[Conjugate Base]}\text{[Weak Acid]}$ where K_{a} is the acid dissociation constant.

3. The pH at the equivalence point depends on how much the weak acid is consumed to be converted into its conjugate base. Note that when an acid neutralizes a base, the pH may or may not be neutral (pH = 7). The pH depends on the strengths of the acid and base. In the case of a weak acid and strong base titration, the pH is greater than 7 at the equivalence point. Thus pH can be calculated using the following formula:

$\ce{pH}_{eq}=-\log[\ce{H3O+}]_{eq}=14+\log[\ce{OH-}]_{eq}$ Where $\ce{{[OH^{-}]}}$ is the concentration of the hydroxide ion. The concentration of the hydroxide ion is calculated from the concentration of the hydronium ion and using the following relationship:

$K_a K_b=K_w=10^{-14}$ Where K_{b} is the base dissociation constant, K_{w} is the water dissociation constant.

4. The pH after the equivalence point depends on the concentration of the conjugate base of the weak acid and the strong base of the titrant. However, the base of the titrant is stronger than the conjugate base of the acid. Therefore, the pH in this region is controlled by the strong base. As such the pH can be found using the following:

$\ce{pH} = 14+\log[\ce{OH^-}]= 14 + \log \frac {(C_bV_b)-(C_aV_a)} { V_a + V_b }$ where $C_{b}$ is the concentration of the strong base that is added, $V_{b}$ is the volume of base added until the equilibrium, $C_{a}$ is the concentration of the strong acid that is added, and $V_{a}$ is the initial volume of the acid.

=== Single formula ===
More accurately, a single formula that describes the titration of a weak acid with a strong base from start to finish is given below:

$$\phi = \frac{C_b V_b }{C_a V_a}$$

where " φ = fraction of completion of the titration (φ < 1 is before the equivalence point, φ = 1 is the equivalence point, and φ > 1 is after the equivalence point)

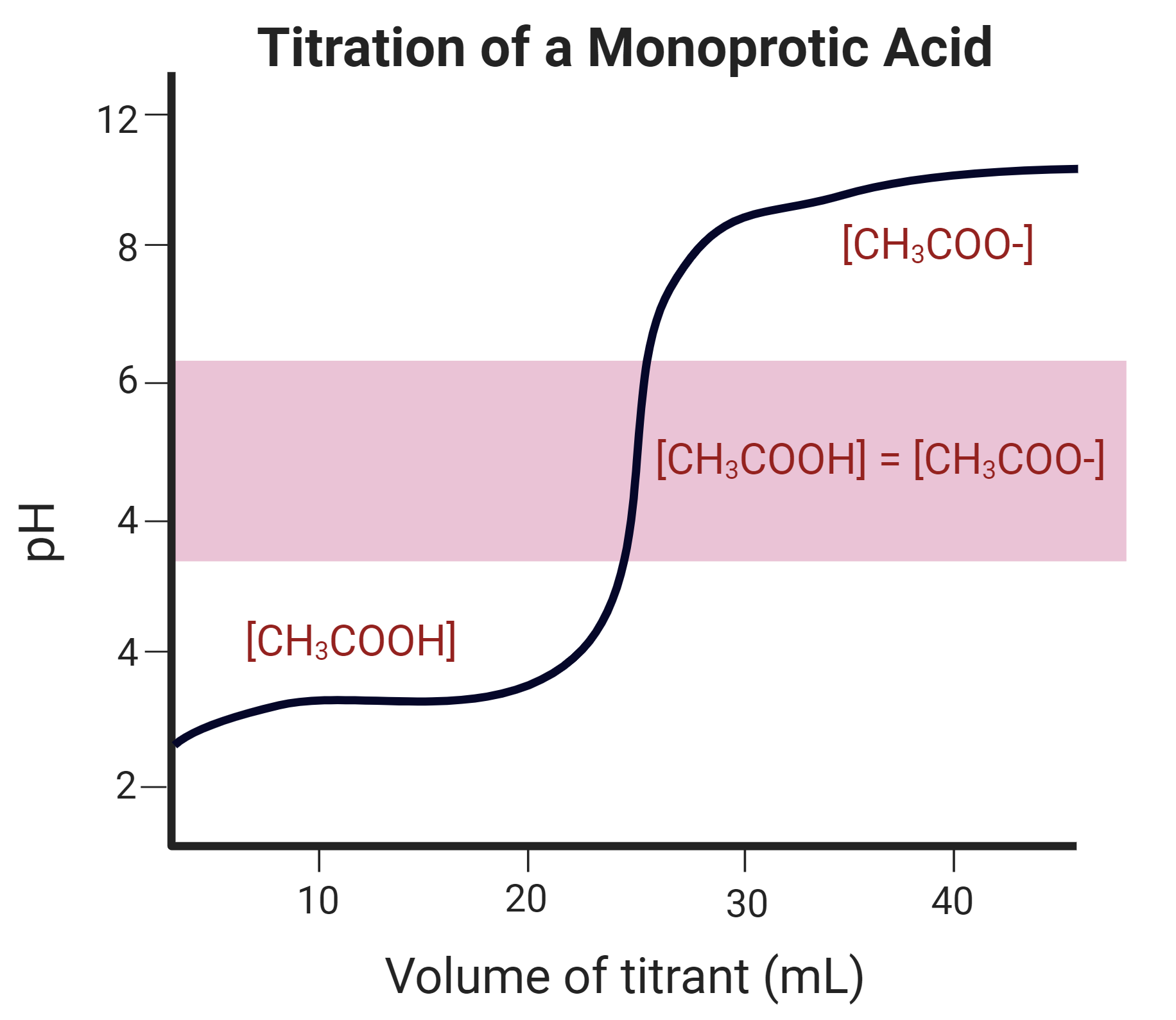
Monoprotic acid titration curve. Highlighted pink region depicts equivalence point.

$C_a, C_b$ = the concentrations of the acid and base respectively

$V_a, V_b$ = the volumes of the acid and base respectively

== Graphical methods ==
Identifying the pH associated with any stage in the titration process is relatively simple for monoprotic acids and bases. A monoprotic acid is an acid that donates one proton. A monoprotic base is a base that accepts one proton. A monoprotic acid or base only has one equivalence point on a titration curve.

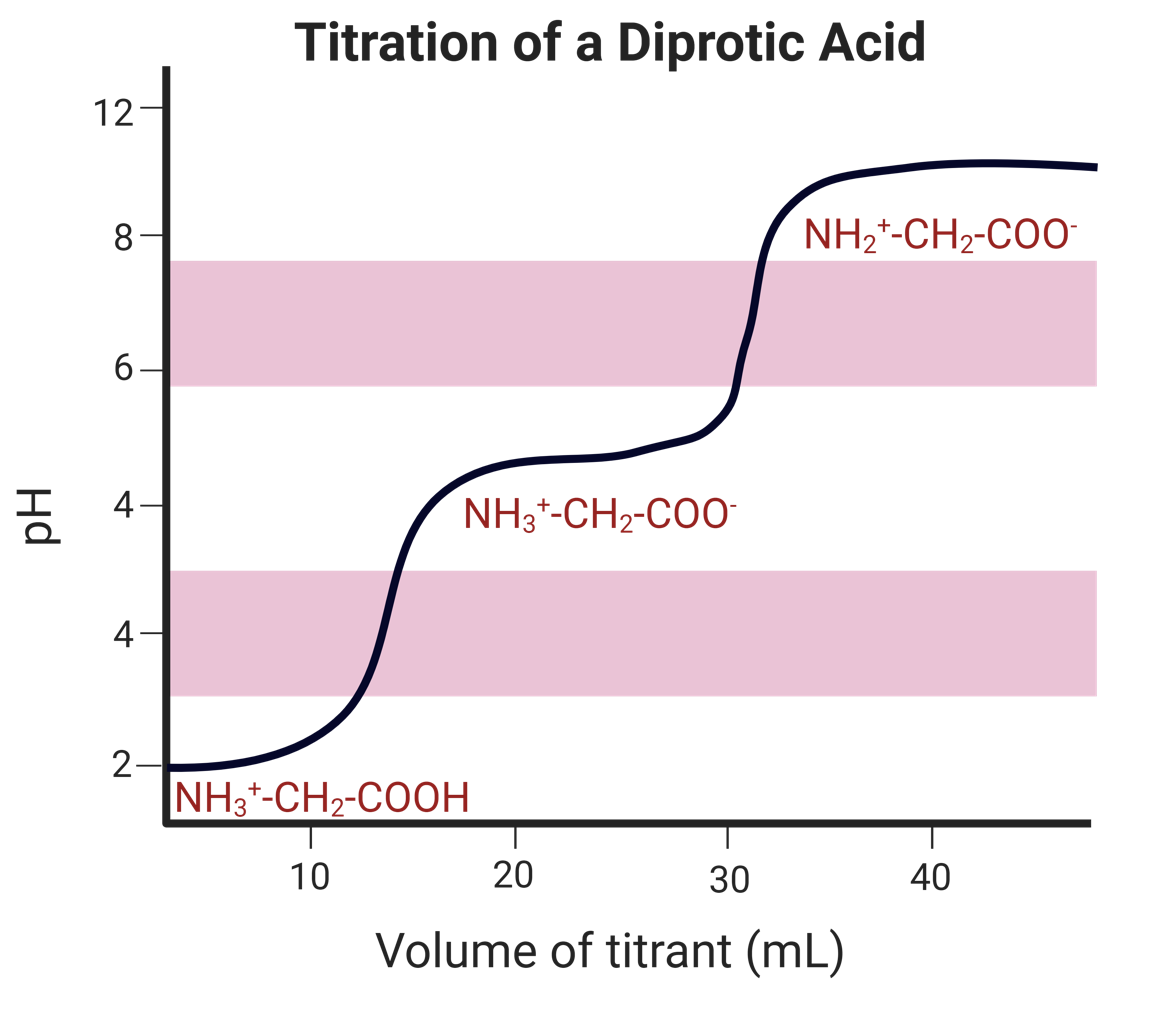
Diprotic acid titration curve. Highlighted pink regions depict equivalence points.

A diprotic acid donates two protons and a diprotic base accepts two protons. The titration curve for a diprotic solution has two equivalence points.

A polyprotic substance has multiple equivalence points.

All titration reactions contain small buffer regions that appear horizontal on the graph. These regions contain comparable concentrations of acid and base, preventing sudden changes in pH when additional acid or base is added.

== Pharmaceutical applications ==
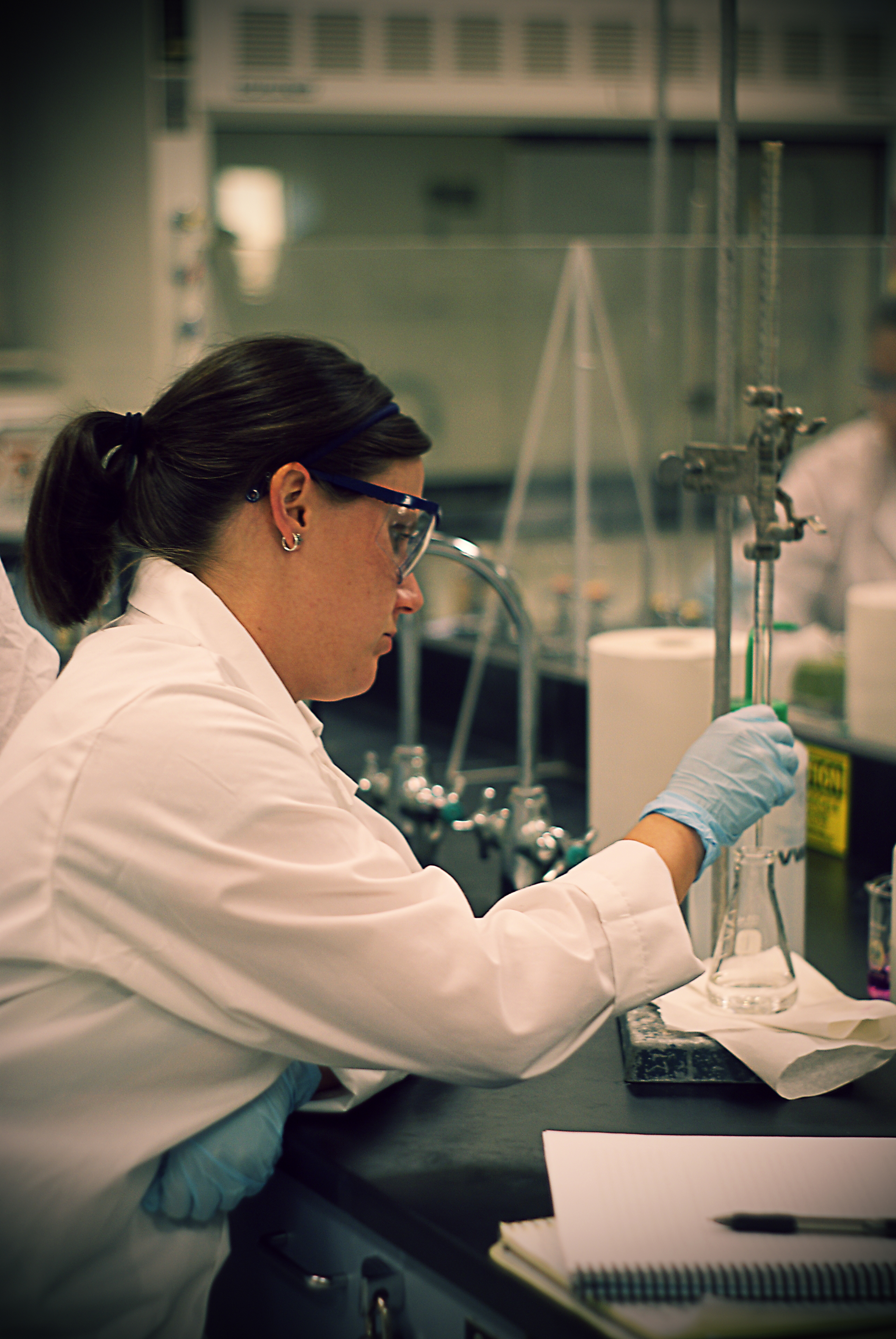
A chemist performing an acid-base titration in lab

In the pharmaceutical industry, acid-base titration serves as a fundamental analytical technique with diverse applications. One primary use involves the determination of the concentration of Active Pharmaceutical Ingredients (APIs) in drug formulations, ensuring product quality and compliance with regulatory standards.

Acid–base titration is particularly valuable in quantifying acidic or basic functional groups with pharmaceutical compounds. Additionally, the method is employed for the analysis of additives or ingredients, making it easier to adjust and control how a product is made. Quality control laboratories utilize acid-base titration to assess the purity of raw materials and to monitor various stages of drug manufacturing processes.

The technique's reliability and simplicity make it an integral tool in pharmaceutical research and development, contributing to the production of safe and effective medications.

== Environmental monitoring applications ==
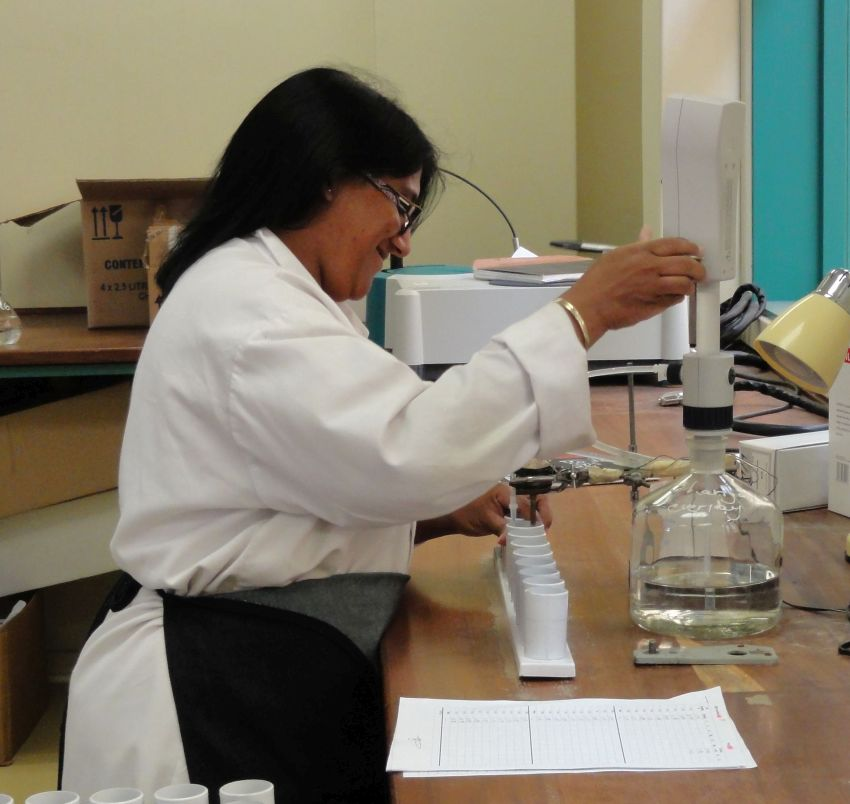
Analysis of soil fertility using acid-base titration

Acid–base titration plays a crucial role in environmental monitoring by providing a quantitative analytical method for assessing the acidity or alkalinity of water samples. The measurement of parameters such as pH, total alkalinity, and acidity is essential in evaluating the environmental impact of industrial discharges, agricultural runoff, and other sources of water contamination.

Acid–base titration allows for the determination of the buffering capacity of natural water systems, aiding in the assessment of their ability to resist changes in pH. Monitoring pH levels is important for preserving aquatic ecosystems and ensuring compliance with environmental regulations.

== See also ==
- Henderson–Hasselbalch equation
- pH indicator
