= Phthalein dye =

Chemical structure of phenolphthalein, a common phthalein dye

Phthalein dyes are a class of dyes mainly used as pH indicators, due to their ability to change colors depending on pH. They are formed by the reaction of phthalic anhydride with various phenols. They are a subclass of triarylmethane dyes.

Common phthalein dyes include:

- Bromothymol blue
- Bromocresol green
- Bromocresol purple
- Cresol Red
- o-Cresolphthalein
- Chlorophenol red
- Dixylenolphthalein
- Guaiacolphthalein
- α-Naphtholphthalein
- Phenolphthalein
- Phenolsulfonphthalein
- Tetrabromophenolphthalein
- Thymol blue
- Thymolphthalein
- Xylenolphthalein

== See also ==
- Triarylmethane dye
