= Sulfarsazene =

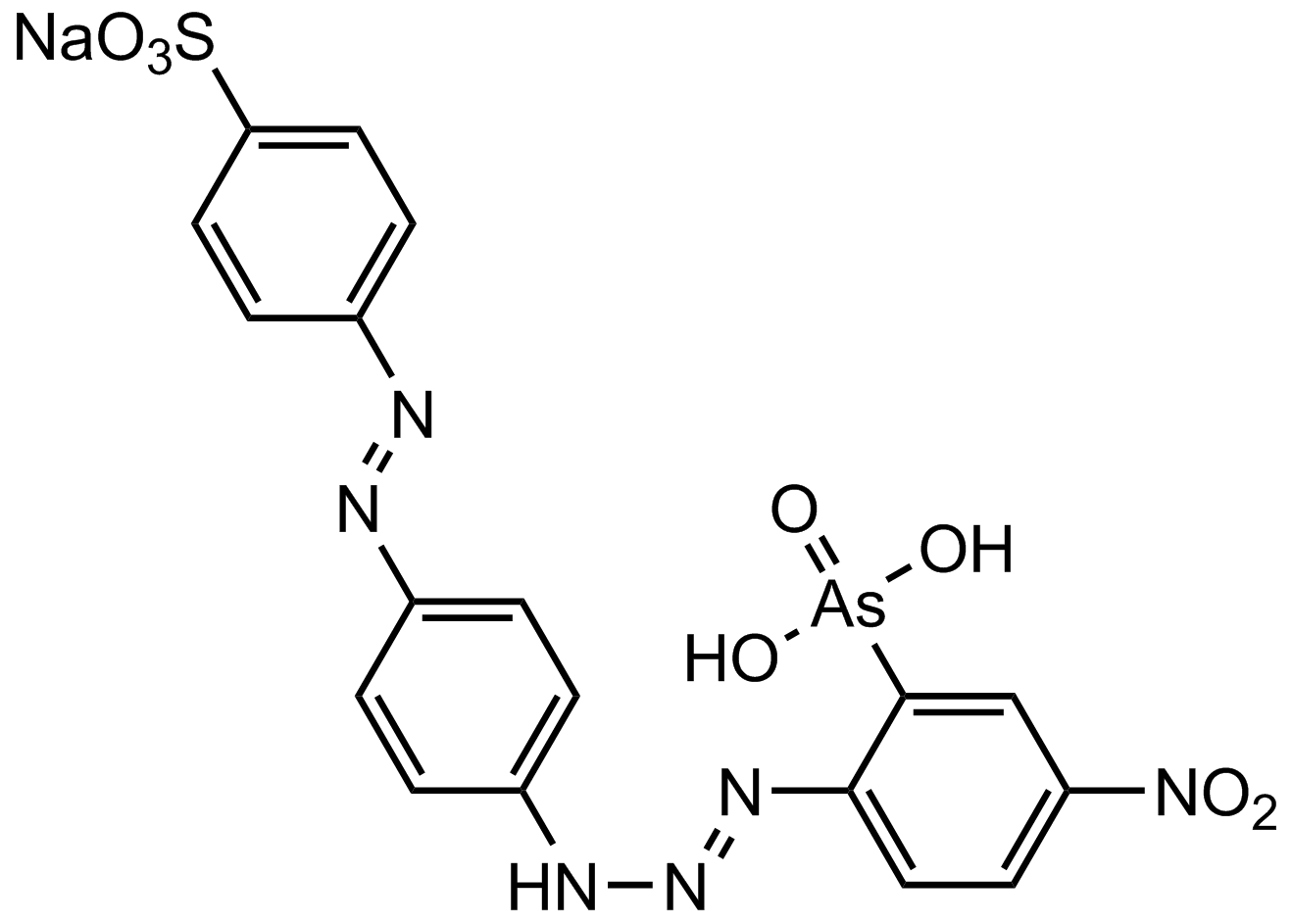

Names
- IUPAC name Sodium 4-({4-[3-(2-arsono-4-nitrophenyl)triaz-2-en-1-yl]phenyl}diazenyl)benzene-1-sulfonate
- Other names Plumbone

Identifiers
CAS Number	1772-02-7
3D model (JSmol)	Interactive image
ChemSpider	4953786
ECHA InfoCard	100.015.634
EC Number	217-197-6
PubChem CID	101970427
CompTox Dashboard (EPA)	DTXSID201319389
- InChI: InChI=1S/C18H15AsN6O8S.3Na/c26-19(27,28)17-11-15(25(29)30)7-10-18(17)23-24-22-14-3-1-12(2-4-14)20-21-13-5-8-16(9-6-13)34(31,32)33;;;/h1-11H,(H,22,23)(H2,26,27,28)(H,31,32,33);;;/q;3*+1/p-3/b21-20+;;; Key: ZMKJQESOJVXFDM-BFUOAJNWSA-K
- SMILES: O=[N+]([O-])c1ccc(N=NNc2ccc(/N=N/c3ccc(S(=O)(=O)[O-])cc3)cc2)c([As](=O)([O-])[O-])c1.[Na+].[Na+].[Na+]

Properties
Chemical formula	C_{18}H_{14}AsN_{6}NaO_{8}S
Molar mass	572.32 g·mol^{−1}
Appearance	brick-red powder
Solubility in water	soluble
- Except where otherwise noted, data are given for materials in their standard state (at 25 °C [77 °F], 100 kPa). Infobox references

Sulfarsazene is a chemical compound with the formula C_{18}H_{12}AsN_{6}Na_{3}O_{8}S, a metal indicator.

== Uses ==
Sulfarsazene is used as a metal indicator for the spectrophotometric and titrimetric determination of Pb^{2+} ions at pH 9.8–10.0 and Zn^{2+} at pH 9.3–9.6 (color transition from orange-pink to lemon yellow).

== Physical properties ==
Sulfarsazene is soluble in water, easily soluble in an aqueous solution of sodium tetraborate, slightly soluble in 95% alcohol, practically insoluble in acetone, chloroform, benzene.

== See also ==
- Chrysophenine
- Bromothymol blue
- Litmus
- Methyl orange
- Phenolphthalein
- pH indicator
- Universal indicator
