= Thymolphthalexone =

Names
- Other names Thymolphthalexon, thymolphthalein complexone, TPC

Identifiers
CAS Number	1913-93-5
3D model (JSmol)	Interactive image
ChemSpider	101208
ECHA InfoCard	100.016.026
EC Number	217-627-2
PubChem CID	112918
CompTox Dashboard (EPA)	DTXSID10172646
- InChI: InChI=1S/C38H44N2O12/c1-19(2)24-11-29(21(5)26(35(24)49)13-39(15-31(41)42)16-32(43)44)38(28-10-8-7-9-23(28)37(51)52-38)30-12-25(20(3)4)36(50)27(22(30)6)14-40(17-33(45)46)18-34(47)48/h7-12,19-20,49-50H,13-18H2,1-6H3,(H,41,42)(H,43,44)(H,45,46)(H,47,48) Key: AGXCADFSYJNMEG-UHFFFAOYSA-N
- SMILES: CC1=C(C=C(C(=C1CN(CC(=O)O)CC(=O)O)O)C(C)C)C2(C3=CC=CC=C3C(=O)O2)C4=C(C(=C(C(=C4)C(C)C)O)CN(CC(=O)O)CC(=O)O)C

Properties
Chemical formula	C_{38}H_{44}N_{2}O_{12}
Molar mass	720.772 g·mol^{−1}
Appearance	white crystalline powder
Melting point	191 °C (376 °F; 464 K)
Solubility in water	soluble
- Except where otherwise noted, data are given for materials in their standard state (at 25 °C [77 °F], 100 kPa). Infobox references

Thymolphthalexone is a chemical compound from the group of iminodiacetic acid derivatives of thymolphthalein. Its chemical formula is C_{38}H_{44}N_{2}O_{12}.

This is a metallochromic indicator widely used in complexometric titrations, particularly for the determination of transition metals. The compound features a thymolphthalein-derived core linked to aminopolycarboxylic acid functional groups. This hybrid architecture grants the compound the ability to preferentially bind specific metal ions through coordinated interactions.

== Synthesis ==
Thymolphthalexone can be obtained by Mannich condensation of formaldehyde and iminodiacetic acid with thymolphthalein.

== Physical properties ==
Thymolphthalexone forms a white crystalline powder soluble in water and organic solvents.

== Uses ==
Thymolphthalexone and its sodium salt are used as an indicator or photometric reagent for alkaline metal ions, such as those of calcium, strontium, barium, and others.

== See also ==
- Bromothymol blue
- Litmus
- Methyl orange
- Phenolphthalein
- pH indicator
- Universal indicator
