= Chrysophenine =

Names
- Other names Direct Yellow 12, chrysophenine G

Identifiers
CAS Number	2870-32-8
3D model (JSmol)	Interactive image
ChemSpider	21159733
ECHA InfoCard	100.018.817
EC Number	220-698-2
PubChem CID	24852029
UNII	8Q5531T139
CompTox Dashboard (EPA)	DTXSID5041728
- InChI: InChI=1S/C30H28N4O8S2.2Na/c1-3-41-27-15-11-23(12-16-27)31-33-25-9-7-21(29(19-25)43(35,36)37)5-6-22-8-10-26(20-30(22)44(38,39)40)34-32-24-13-17-28(18-14-24)42-4-2;;/h5-20H,3-4H2,1-2H3,(H,35,36,37)(H,38,39,40);;/q;2*+1/p-2/b6-5+,33-31+,34-32+;; Key: YQMJDPHTMKUEHG-RNVLWOMCSA-L
- SMILES: CCOC1=CC=C(C=C1)N=NC2=CC(=C(C=C2)C=CC3=C(C=C(C=C3)N=NC4=CC=C(C=C4)OCC)S(=O)(=O)[O-])S(=O)(=O)[O-].[Na+].[Na+]

Properties
Chemical formula	C_{30}H_{26}N_{4}Na_{2}O_{8}S_{2}
Molar mass	680.66 g·mol^{−1}
Appearance	orange powder
Melting point	174 °C (345 °F; 447 K)
Solubility in water	soluble
- Except where otherwise noted, data are given for materials in their standard state (at 25 °C [77 °F], 100 kPa). Infobox references

Chrysophenine is a yellow water-soluble disazo stilbene dye, also known as Direct Yellow 12 or Chrysophenine G. The chemical formula is C_{30}H_{26}N_{4}Na_{2}O_{8}S_{2}.

== Synthesis ==
Chrysophenine is obtained by reacting Brilliant Yellow with chloroethane, which converts the two hydroxyl groups of Brilliant Yellow into ether groups. In its pure state, the compound forms an orange powder, soluble in water.

== Uses ==
The compound is widely used in textile dyeing, biological staining, and has potential applications in photodynamic therapy. Although it can contribute to water pollution, it can be effectively removed from wastewater through membrane filtration techniques.

Chrysophenine is used as a direct dye, meaning it can directly stain fibers without the need for a mordant (a substance that helps fix the dye to the fiber). It gives cellulose materials (linen, cotton, paper, viscose, etc.) a bright golden-yellow color. The presence of sulfogroups in the molecules allows the dye to be used as an acidic dye for dyeing wool and silk fibers.

Chrysophenine is also known to be radiation and acid resistant.

== See also ==
- Bromothymol blue
- Litmus
- Methyl orange
- Phenolphthalein
- pH indicator
- Universal indicator
