= Direct Yellow 4 =

Names
- Other names Brilliant Yellow, C.I.Direct Yellow 4, Direct Yellow C, Direct Brilliant Yellow P

Identifiers
CAS Number	3051-11-4
3D model (JSmol)	Interactive image
ChemSpider	17946628
ECHA InfoCard	100.019.335
EC Number	221-267-1
PubChem CID	5702677
UNII	ZUN7L1ADIE
CompTox Dashboard (EPA)	DTXSID8062814
- InChI: InChI=1S/C26H20N4O8S2.2Na/c31-23-11-7-19(8-12-23)27-29-21-5-3-17(25(15-21)39(33,34)35)1-2-18-4-6-22(16-26(18)40(36,37)38)30-28-20-9-13-24(32)14-10-20;;/h1-16,31-32H,(H,33,34,35)(H,36,37,38);; Key: CUROJYZBFQWOAI-UHFFFAOYSA-N
- SMILES: [Na].O=S(=O)(O)C1=CC(N=NC2=CC=C(O)C=C2)=CC=C1C=CC3=CC=C(N=NC4=CC=C(O)C=C4)C=C3S(=O)(=O)O

Properties
Chemical formula	C_{26}H_{18}N_{4}Na_{2}O_{8}S_{2}
Molar mass	624.55 g·mol^{−1}
Appearance	Orange powder
Density	1.5 g/cm^{3}
Melting point	250 °C (482 °F; 523 K)
Solubility in water	soluble
- Except where otherwise noted, data are given for materials in their standard state (at 25 °C [77 °F], 100 kPa). Infobox references

Direct Yellow 4 is a chemical compound with the formula C_{26}H_{18}N_{4}Na_{2}O_{8}S_{2}. This is a direct dis-azo dye, a diamine derivative with separated azo groups. Due to its properties, value and strength, it is considered one of the most important dyes based on stilbene. It can be used as an acid-base indicator. In an alkaline environment, the yellow color of the dye deepens through orange to red at a pH of 6.4 → 8.0.

== Synthesis ==
The compound can be obtained by coupling tetrazotized diaminostilbenesulfonic acid twice to phenol.

== Physical properties ==
The compound forms orange powder. It is water-soluble, producing a golden brown color, and moderately soluble in ethanol, also yielding a golden brown shade. It is slightly soluble in acetone and soluble in fiber materials. When treated with concentrated sulfuric acid, it turns red to light purple; diluted sulfuric acid produces a purple color with blackish light purple precipitate. In nitric acid solution, it shows a dark brown color (not in all solutions).

Adding concentrated hydrochloric acid to the dye solution results in a dark purple color with precipitation. When thick sodium hydroxide solution is added, it turns pale light orange; with 10% sodium hydroxide solution, it becomes bright red.

== Uses ==
This dye is primarily used for coloring cellulose and polyamide fibers but is also suitable for dyeing leather and paper. It is known for its excellent dyeing properties and outstanding discharge fastness.

Direct Yellow 4 is also used as an acid-base indicator.

== See also ==
- Chrysophenine
- Primuline
- pH indicator
- Universal indicator
