= Methyl yellow =

Names
- Preferred IUPAC name N,N-Dimethyl-4-(phenyldiazenyl)aniline
- Other names 4-Dimethylaminoazobenzene p-Dimethylaminoazobenzene; DAB; N,N-Dimethyl-4-phenylazoaniline; N,N-Dimethyl-4-aminoazobenzene; Butter Yellow; Solvent Yellow 2 C.I. 11020

Identifiers
CAS Number	60-11-7
3D model (JSmol)	Interactive image
ChEMBL	ChEMBL263116
ChemSpider	5829
ECHA InfoCard	100.000.414
EC Number	200-455-7
PubChem CID	6053
RTECS number	BX7350000
UNII	A49L8E13FD
CompTox Dashboard (EPA)	DTXSID5020491
- InChI: InChI=1S/C14H15N3/c1-17(2)14-10-8-13(9-11-14)16-15-12-6-4-3-5-7-12/h3-11H,1-2H3/b16-15+ Key: JCYPECIVGRXBMO-FOCLMDBBSA-N; InChI=1/C14H15N3/c1-17(2)14-10-8-13(9-11-14)16-15-12-6-4-3-5-7-12/h3-11H,1-2H3/b16-15+ Key: JCYPECIVGRXBMO-FOCLMDBBBF
- SMILES: N(=N/c1ccccc1)\c2ccc(N(C)C)cc2

Properties
Chemical formula	C_{14}H_{15}N_{3}
Molar mass	225.295 g·mol^{−1}
Appearance	Yellow crystals
Melting point	111–116 °C (232–241 °F; 384–389 K) decomposes
Solubility in water	13.6 mg/l
log P	4.58

Hazards
- Occupational safety and health (OHS/OSH)
Main hazards	Carcinogen
- GHS labelling
Pictograms	(GHS06: Toxic) (GHS08: Health hazard)
Signal word	Danger
Hazard statements	H301, H351
Precautionary statements	P281, P301+P310
NFPA 704 (fire diamond)	2 1 0
- NIOSH (US health exposure limits)
PEL (Permissible)	OSHA-regulated carcinogen
REL (Recommended)	Ca
IDLH (Immediate danger)	Ca [N.D.]
- Except where otherwise noted, data are given for materials in their standard state (at 25 °C [77 °F], 100 kPa). verify (what is ?) Infobox references

Methyl yellow, or C.I. 11020, is an organic compound with the formula C_{6}H_{5}N_{2}C_{6}H_{4}N(CH_{3})_{2}. It is an azo dye derived from dimethylaniline. It is a yellow solid. According to X-ray crystallography, the C_{14}N_{3} core of the molecule is planar.

It is used as a dye for plastics and may be used as a pH indicator.

Methyl yellow (pH indicator)
below pH 2.9		above pH 4.0
(red) 2.9	⇌	4.0 (yellow)

In aqueous solution at low pH, methyl yellow appears red. Between pH 2.9 and 4.0, methyl yellow undergoes a transition, to become yellow above pH 4.0.

== Safety ==
It is a possible carcinogen. As "butter yellow", the agent had been used as a food additive in butter and margarine before its toxicity was recognized.

== History ==
Butter yellow was synthesized by Peter Griess in the 1860s at the Royal College of Chemistry in London. The dye was used to dye butter in Germany and other parts of the world during the latter half of the 19th century and the beginning of the 20th before being phased out in the 1930s and 40s. It was in the 1930s that research led by Riojun Kinosita showed the link between several azo dyes and cancer, linking butter yellow to liver cancer in rats after two to three months exposure. In 1939, the International Congress for Cancer Research issued a recommendation for the banning of cancer-causing food dyes (including butter yellow) from food production.

In 2014, dried tofu products such as dougan (豆乾) from Taiwan were found to have been adulterated with methyl yellow which was used as a coloring agent.

== See also ==
Structurally similar compounds:

- Chrysophenine
- Methyl red
- Solvent Yellow 56
- Methyl orange
