= Phph =

phph or PhPh may refer to:

- phph, an abbreviation for the pH indicator phenolphthalein
- PhPh, chemical shorthand notation for two phenyl groups attached to each other; see biphenyl
