= Alizarine yellow =

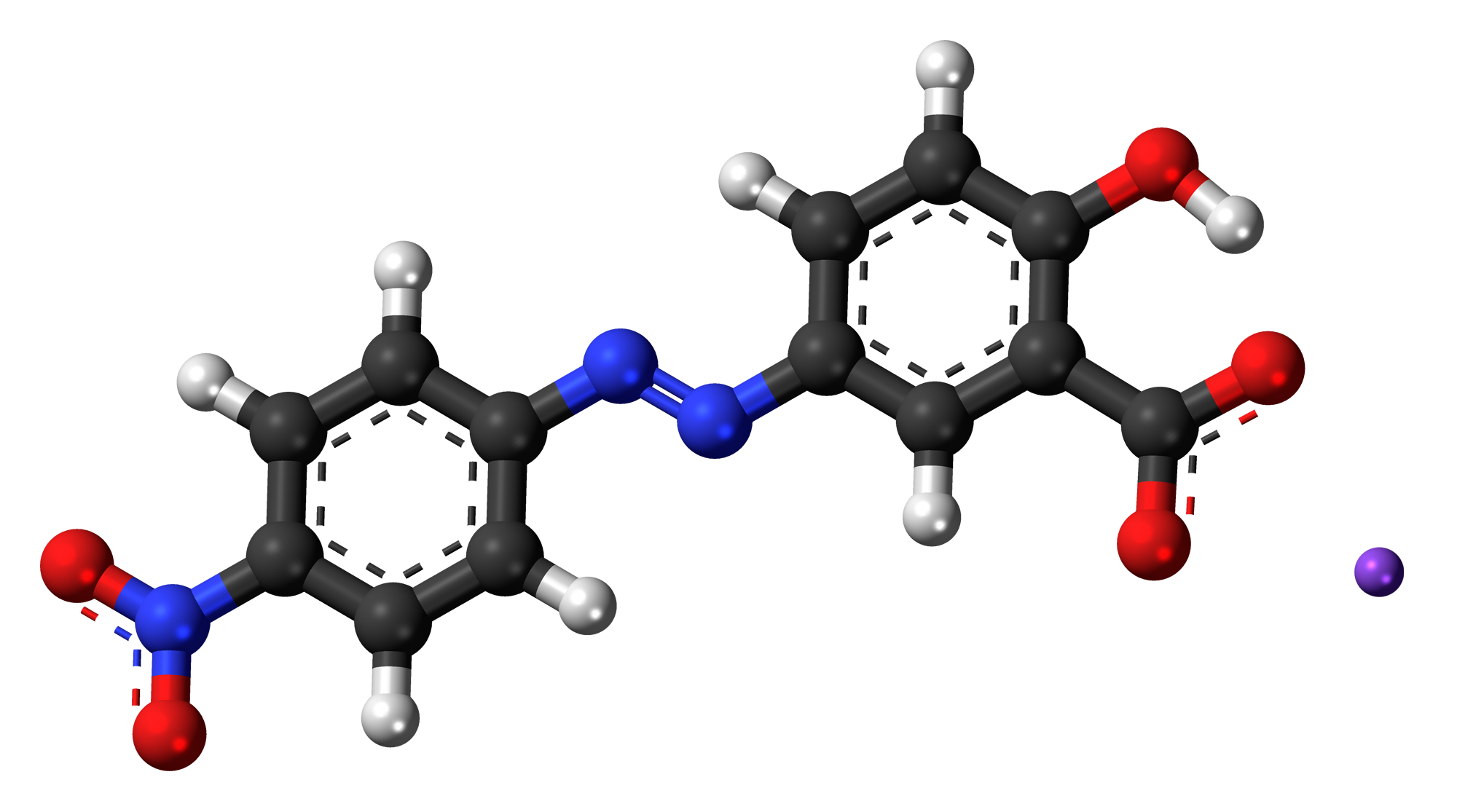
Ball-and-stick model of the Alizarine Yellow R molecule, a yellow azo dye. This image shows the sodium salt. Colour code: Carbon, C: black Hydrogen, H: white Oxygen, O: red Nitrogen, N: blue Sodium, Na: lilac

Alizarine yellow may refer to:

- Alizarine Yellow A (gallobenzophenone)
- Alizarine Yellow C (gallacetophenone)
- Alizarine Yellow 2G
- Alizarine Yellow R
