= PHydrion =

pHydrion is the trademarked name for a popular line of chemical test products, marketed by Micro Essential Laboratory, Inc., the original manufacturer of Hydrion and pHydrion products. The trademarked pHydrion product line comprises chemical test papers, chemical indicators, chemical test kits, chemical indicator kits, pH indicator pencils, chemical buffers, buffer salts, buffer preservatives, dispensers, color charts, and testing products, for use in testing, detecting, identifying, measuring, and indicating levels of pH, of sanitizers, and of other substances.
