= Primuline =

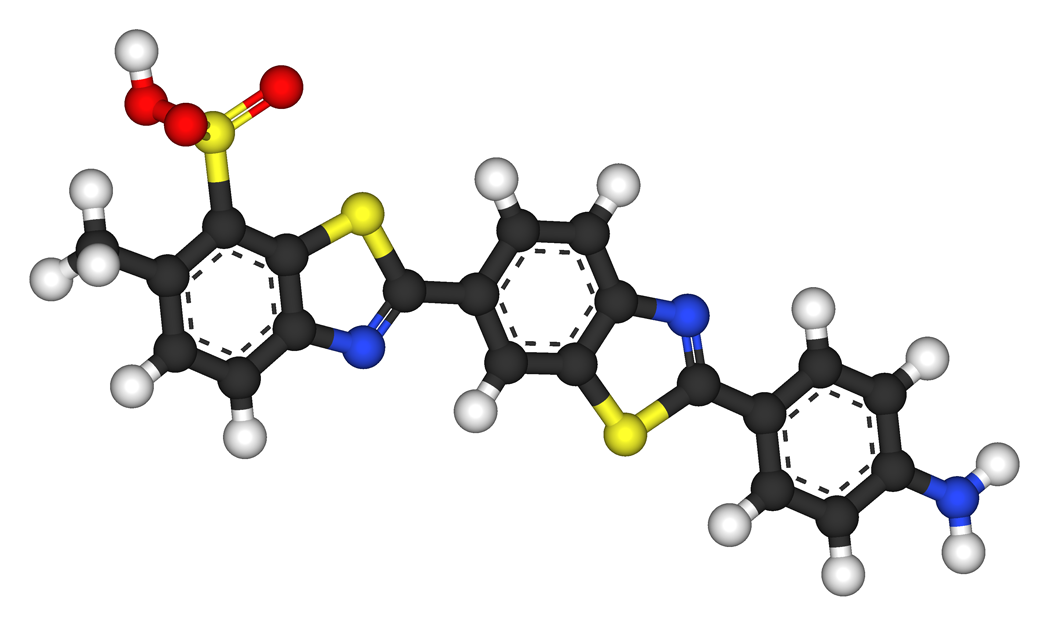

Names
- Preferred IUPAC name Sodium 2′-(4-aminophenyl)-6-methyl[2,6′-bi-1,3-benzothiazole]-7-sulfonate
- Other names Direct yellow 59

Identifiers
CAS Number	8064-60-6
3D model (JSmol)	Interactive image
ChEBI	CHEBI:90399
ChemSpider	74524
ECHA InfoCard	100.030.698
EC Number	233-781-3
PubChem CID	3769888
CompTox Dashboard (EPA)	DTXSID1065051
- InChI: InChI=1S/C21H15N3O3S3.Na/c1-11-2-8-16-18(19(11)30(25,26)27)29-21(24-16)13-5-9-15-17(10-13)28-20(23-15)12-3-6-14(22)7-4-12;/h2-10H,22H2,1H3,(H,25,26,27);/q;+1/p-1 Key: RSRNHSYYBLEMOI-UHFFFAOYSA-M; InChI=1/C21H15N3O3S3.Na/c1-11-2-8-16-18(19(11)30(25,26)27)29-21(24-16)13-5-9-15-17(10-13)28-20(23-15)12-3-6-14(22)7-4-12;/h2-10H,22H2,1H3,(H,25,26,27);/q;+1/p-1 Key: RSRNHSYYBLEMOI-REWHXWOFAP
- SMILES: [Na+].[O-]S(=O)(=O)c1c(ccc2nc(sc12)c4ccc3nc(sc3c4)c5ccc(N)cc5)C

Properties
Chemical formula	C_{21}H_{15}N_{3}O_{3}S_{3} (free acid)
Molar mass	453.557 g/mol (free acid)
- Except where otherwise noted, data are given for materials in their standard state (at 25 °C [77 °F], 100 kPa). verify (what is ?) Infobox references

Primuline is a dye containing the benzothiazole ring system. Primuline itself is also known as Direct yellow 59 or C.I. 49000.

The primulines are considered derivatives of dehydrothiotoluidine (aminobenzenyltoluylmercaptan), which is obtained when para-toluidine is heated with sulfur for eighteen hours at 180–190 °C and then for a further six hours at 200–220 °C Dehydrothiotoluidine is not itself a dye-stuff, but if the heating is carried out at a higher temperature in the presence of more sulfur, then a base is formed, which gives primuline yellow upon sulfonation.

Primuline yellow is a mixture of sodium salts and probably contains at least three thiazole rings in combination. It is a substantive cotton dye of rather fugitive shade, but can be diazotized on the fibre and then developed with other components, yielding a series of ingrain colors.

Primuline is usually available as a sodium salt. Primuline is fluorescent.

Thioflavin T is obtained by the methylation of dehydrothiotoluidine with methanol in the presence of hydrochloric acid. Thioflavin S results from the methylation of dehydrothiotoluidine with sulfonic acid. This sulfonic acid on oxidation with bleaching powder or with lead peroxide, in alkaline solution yields chloramine yellow, which dyes cotton a beautiful yellow.

== See also ==
- Direct Yellow 4
