= Thymolphthalein =

Names
- Preferred IUPAC name 3,3-Bis[4-hydroxy-2-methyl-5-(propan-2-yl)phenyl]-2-benzofuran-1(3H)-one

Identifiers
CAS Number	125-20-2
3D model (JSmol)	Interactive image
ChEMBL	ChEMBL587849
ChemSpider	29054
ECHA InfoCard	100.004.300
EC Number	204-729-7
PubChem CID	31316
UNII	YG5I28WSQP
CompTox Dashboard (EPA)	DTXSID2051633
- InChI: InChI=1S/C28H30O4/c1-15(2)20-13-23(17(5)11-25(20)29)28(22-10-8-7-9-19(22)27(31)32-28)24-14-21(16(3)4)26(30)12-18(24)6/h7-16,29-30H,1-6H3 Key: LDKDGDIWEUUXSH-UHFFFAOYSA-N; InChI=1/C28H30O4/c1-15(2)20-13-23(17(5)11-25(20)29)28(22-10-8-7-9-19(22)27(31)32-28)24-14-21(16(3)4)26(30)12-18(24)6/h7-16,29-30H,1-6H3 Key: LDKDGDIWEUUXSH-UHFFFAOYAV
- SMILES: O=C1OC(c2ccccc12)(c3cc(c(O)cc3C)C(C)C)c4cc(c(O)cc4C)C(C)C

Properties
Chemical formula	C_{28}H_{30}O_{4}
Molar mass	430.544 g·mol^{−1}
Appearance	White powder
Melting point	248 to 252 °C (478 to 486 °F; 521 to 525 K) (decomposes)

Hazards
- GHS labelling
Pictograms	(GHS08: Health hazard)
Signal word	Warning
Hazard statements	H341, H350, H361
Precautionary statements	P201, P202, P210, P233, P240, P241, P242, P243, P280, P281, P303+P361+P353, P308+P313, P370+P378, P403+P235, P405, P501
NFPA 704 (fire diamond)	1 0 0
- Except where otherwise noted, data are given for materials in their standard state (at 25 °C [77 °F], 100 kPa). verify (what is ?) Infobox references

Thymolphthalein is a phthalein dye used as an acid–base (pH) indicator. Its transition range is around pH 9.3–10.5. Below this pH, it is colorless; above, it is blue. The molar extinction coefficient for the blue thymolphthalein dianion is 38,000 M^{−1} cm^{−1} at 595 nm.

Thymolphthalein (pH indicator)
below pH 9.3		above pH 10.5
(colorless) 9.3	⇌	10.5 (blue)

Thymolphthalein is also known to have use as a laxative and for disappearing ink.

== Preparation ==
Thymolphthalein can be synthesized from thymol and phthalic anhydride.

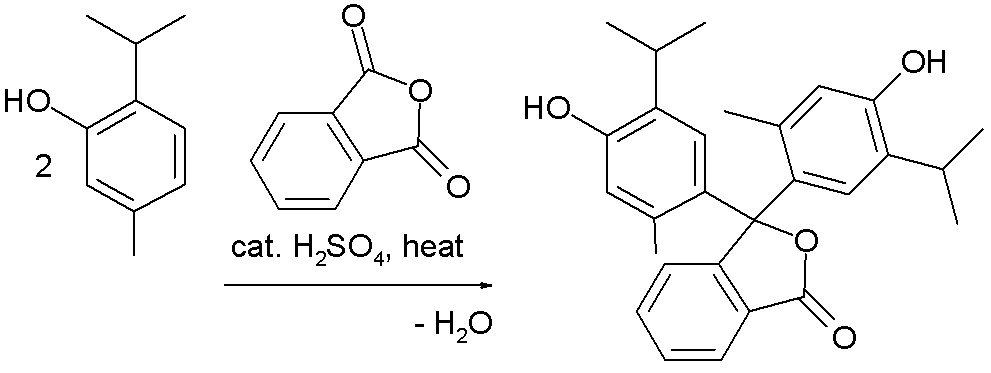

== See also ==
- Phenolphthalein
- Thymolphthalexone
