= Hydrion paper =

Compound pH indicators

Hydrion is a trademarked name for a popular line of compound pH indicators, marketed by Micro Essential Laboratory Inc., exhibiting a series of color changes (typically producing a recognizably different color for each pH unit) over a range of pH values. Although solutions are available, the most common forms of Hydrion are a series of papers impregnated with various mixtures of indicator dyes. It is considered a "universal indicator".

== See also ==
- PHydrion
