= Alizarine Yellow R =

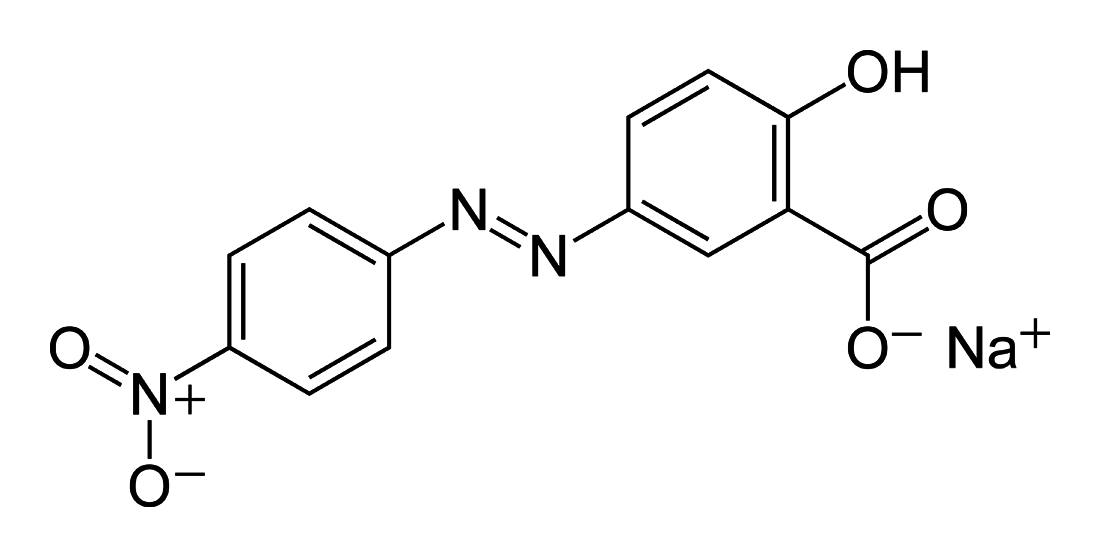
- Alizarin Yellow R (sodium salt)

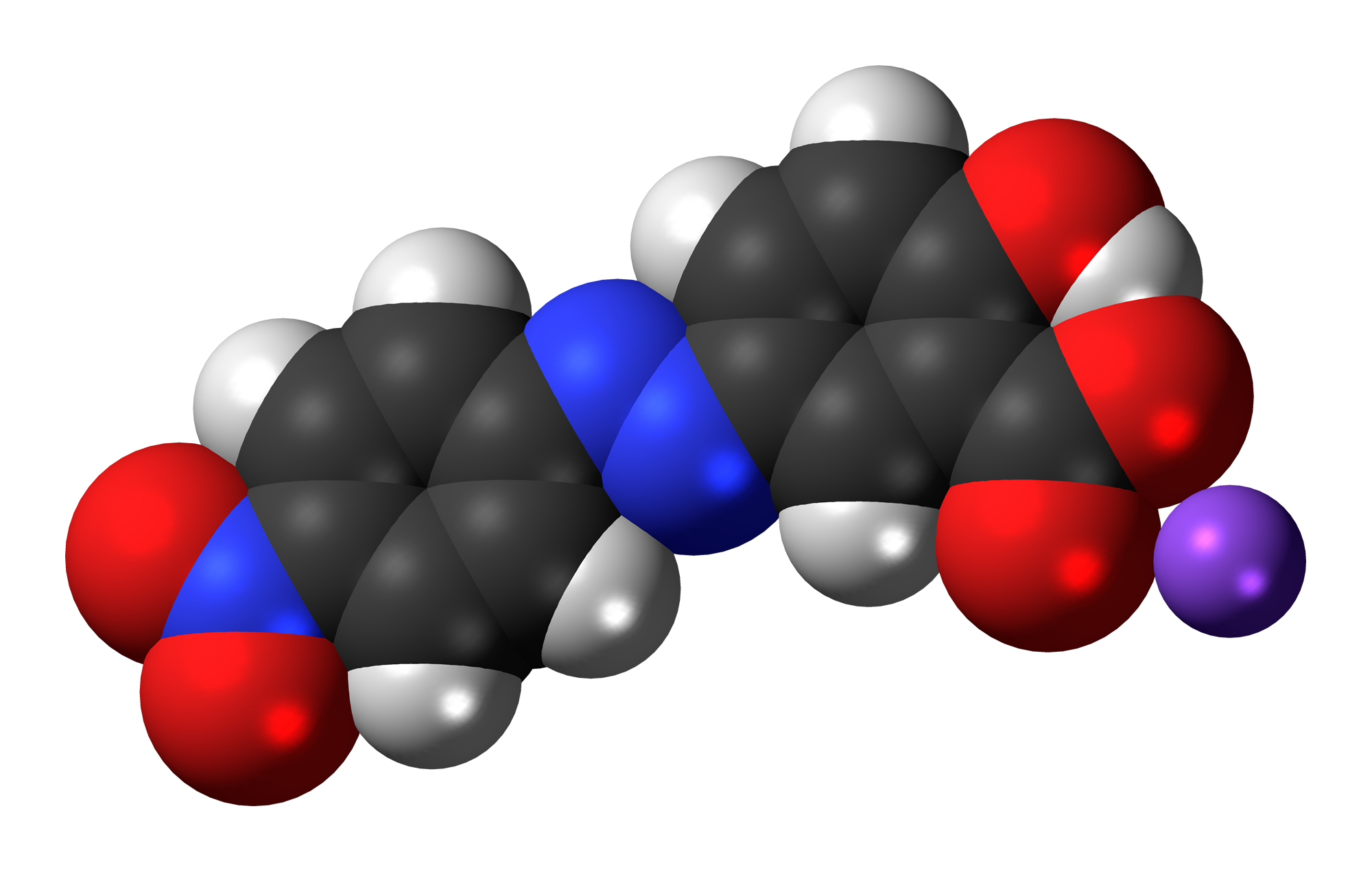

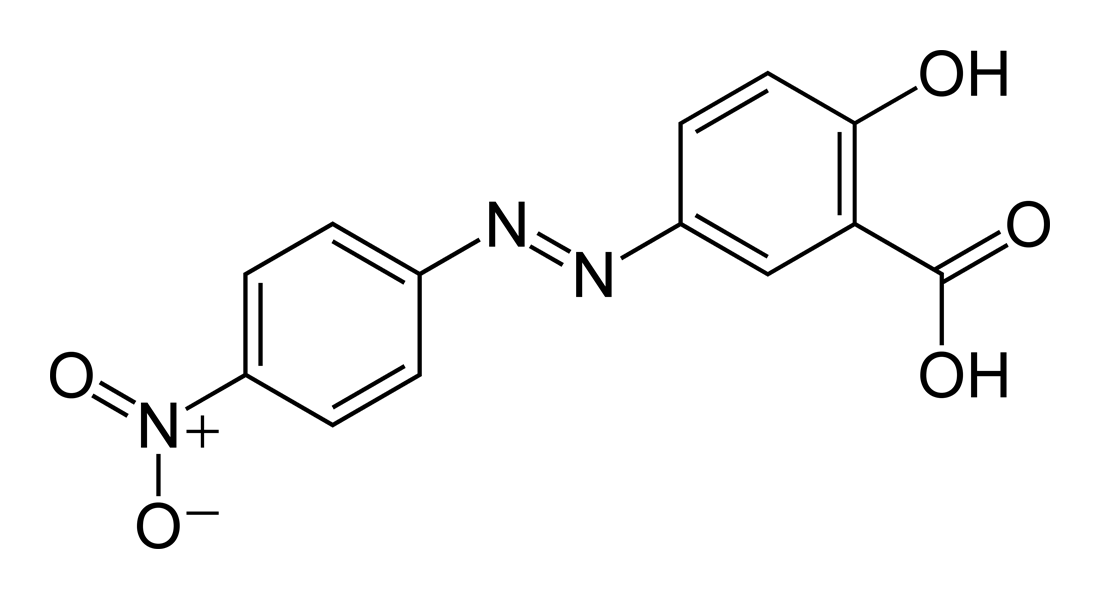
- Alizarin Yellow R (acid)

Names
- IUPAC name Sodium 2-hydroxy-5-[(E)-(4-nitrophenyl)diazenyl]benzoate
- Other names 5-[(p-Nitrophenyl)azo]salicylic acid sodium salt Chrome orange Mordant orange 1 C.I. 14030

Identifiers
CAS Number	1718-34-9 (Na salt); 2243-76-7 (acid)
3D model (JSmol)	Interactive image
ChemSpider	17215762
ECHA InfoCard	100.017.109
EC Number	209-536-1
PubChem CID	6504724 (Na salt)
UNII	R1T3O0G585 (Na salt); OBF2VZO457 (acid)
CompTox Dashboard (EPA)	DTXSID1033163
- InChI: InChI=1S/C13H9N3O5.Na/c17-12-6-3-9(7-11(12)13(18)19)15-14-8-1-4-10(5-2-8)16(20)21;/h1-7,17H,(H,18,19);/q;+1/p-1/b15-14+; Key: HXKKTXMJSVFQSL-WPDLWGESSA-M; InChI=1/C13H9N3O5.Na/c17-12-6-3-9(7-11(12)13(18)19)15-14-8-1-4-10(5-2-8)16(20)21;/h1-7,17H,(H,18,19);/q;+1/p-1/b15-14+; Key: HXKKTXMJSVFQSL-QUIZLSBABP
- SMILES: [Na+].O=C([O-])c1cc(ccc1O)/N=N/c2ccc(cc2)[N+]([O-])=O

Properties
Chemical formula	C_{13}H_{8}N_{3}NaO_{5} (Na salt); C_{13}H_{9}N_{3}O_{5} (acid)
Molar mass	309.21 g mol^{−1} (Na salt); 287.23 g mol^{−1} (acid)

Hazards
- GHS labelling
Pictograms	(GHS07: Exclamation mark)
Signal word	Warning
Hazard statements	H302, H319
Precautionary statements	P264, P270, P280, P301+P312, P305+P351+P338, P337+P313
- Except where otherwise noted, data are given for materials in their standard state (at 25 °C [77 °F], 100 kPa). verify (what is ?) Infobox references

Alizarine Yellow R is a yellow colored azo dye made by the diazo coupling reaction. It is usually commercially available as a sodium salt. In its pure form, it is a rust-colored solid. It is mainly used as a pH indicator.

Alizarine Yellow R (pH indicator)
below pH 10.1		above pH 12.0
10.1	⇌	12.0

== Preparation ==
Alizarine Yellow R is produced by azo coupling of salicylic acid and diazonium derivative of 4-Nitroaniline.

Synthesis of Alizarine Yellow R
4-Nitroaniline is first treated with sodium nitrite in acidic conditions to produce a diazonium derivative (4-Nitrobenzene-1-diazonium), which then undergoes azo coupling with a salicylic acid to produce Alizarine Yellow R.
