= Chlorophenol red =

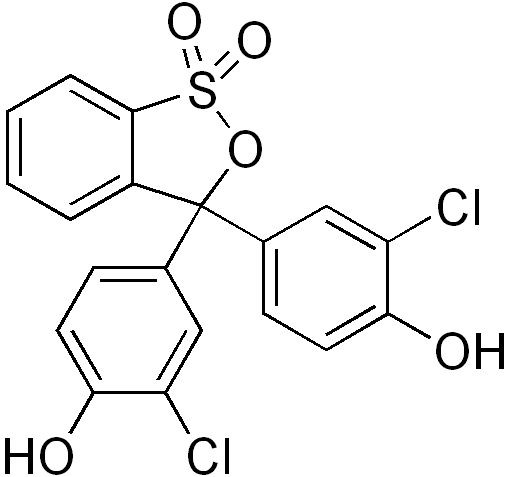

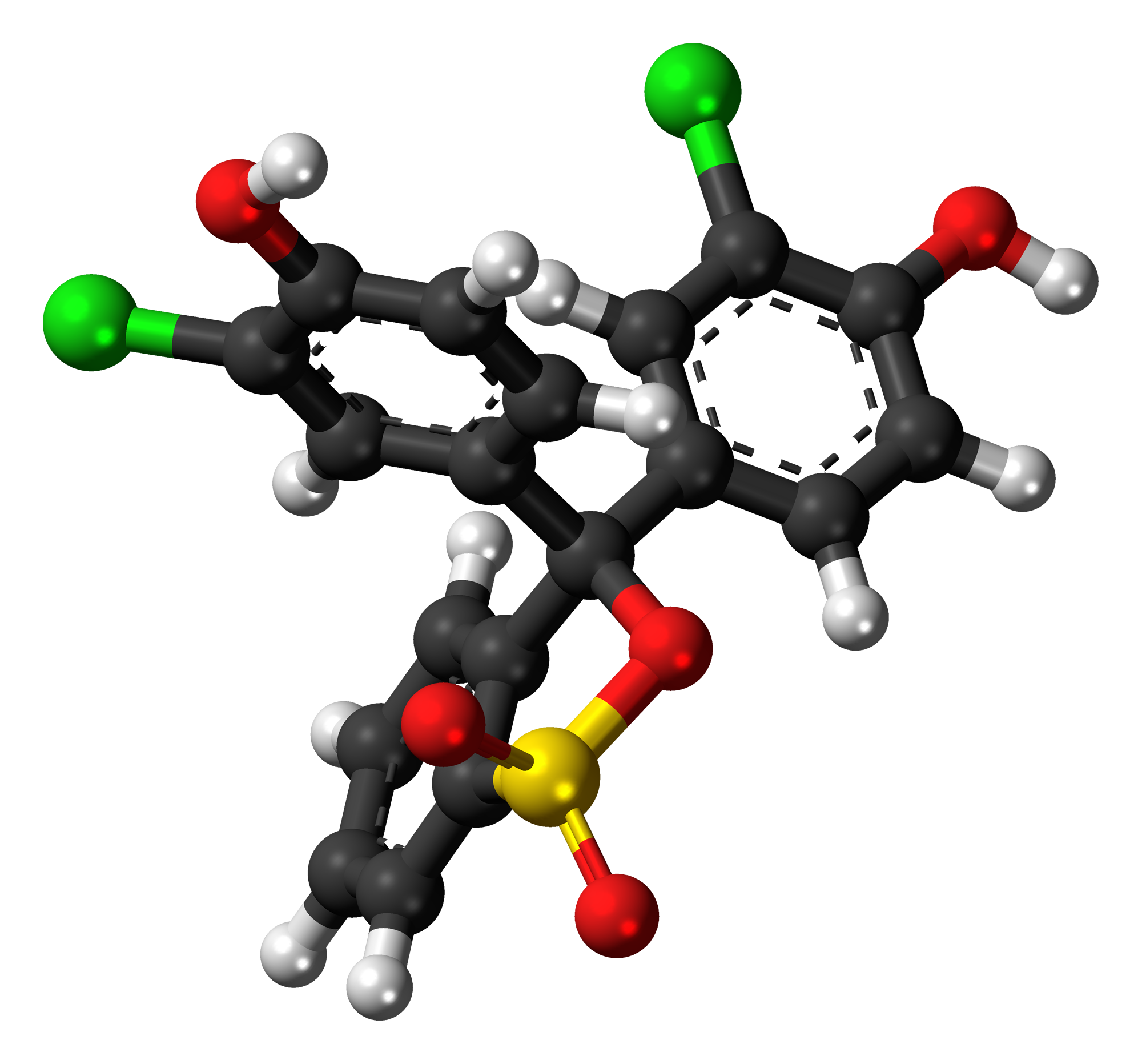

Names
- Preferred IUPAC name 3,3-Bis(3-chloro-4-hydroxyphenyl)-2,1λ^{6}-benzoxathiole-1,1(3H)-dione
- Other names 3′,3′-Dichlorophenolsulfonaphthalein

Identifiers
CAS Number	4430-20-0
3D model (JSmol)	Interactive image
ChemSpider	19293
ECHA InfoCard	100.022.382
EC Number	224-619-2
PubChem CID	20486
UNII	P3S5KH33EA
CompTox Dashboard (EPA)	DTXSID4063450
- InChI: InChI=1S/C19H12Cl2O5S/c20-14-9-11(5-7-16(14)22)19(12-6-8-17(23)15(21)10-12)13-3-1-2-4-18(13)27(24,25)26-19/h1-10,22-23H Key: WWAABJGNHFGXSJ-UHFFFAOYSA-N; InChI=1/C19H12Cl2O5S/c20-14-9-11(5-7-16(14)22)19(12-6-8-17(23)15(21)10-12)13-3-1-2-4-18(13)27(24,25)26-19/h1-10,22-23H Key: WWAABJGNHFGXSJ-UHFFFAOYAK
- SMILES: C1=CC=C2C(=C1)C(OS2(=O)=O)(C3=CC(=C(C=C3)O)Cl)C4=CC(=C(C=C4)O)Cl

Properties
Chemical formula	C_{19}H_{12}Cl_{2}O_{5}S
Molar mass	423.26 g·mol^{−1}
Melting point	261 °C (502 °F; 534 K)
- Except where otherwise noted, data are given for materials in their standard state (at 25 °C [77 °F], 100 kPa). verify (what is ?) Infobox references

Chlorophenol red (pH indicator)
below pH 5.4		above pH 6.8
(yellow) 5.4	⇌	6.8 (violet)

Chlorophenol red is an indicator dye that changes color from yellow to violet in the pH range 5.4 to 6.8. The pH of a substance is determined by taking the negative logarithm of the Hydronium ion concentration and the indictor changes color due to the dissociation of H^{+} ions. The lambda max is at 572 nm.

== Properties and uses ==
The dissociation mechanism of chlorophenol red is similar to that of phenolphthalein meaning it can be used as a color indicator. The dissociation of hydroxyl and hydrogen atoms creates the dissociate scheme of chlorophenol red to change color from yellow to red.

The pH properties of chlorophenol red are used to selectively determine the amount of chlorine dioxide in drinking water. Chlorophenol red selectively reacts with 0.1–1.9 mg/L chlorine dioxide at pH 7.

The electrochemical properties of Chlorophenol red allows it to be a chromogenic label and can undergo oxidation creating several phenolic intermediates. The bacterial hydrolysis of a chlorophenol red labelled substrate produces chlorine retaining intermediates on electrodes.

== Cited sources ==
- Haynes, William M., ed. (2016). CRC Handbook of Chemistry and Physics (97th ed.). CRC Press. ISBN 9781498754293.
