= Bromothymol blue =

pH indicator

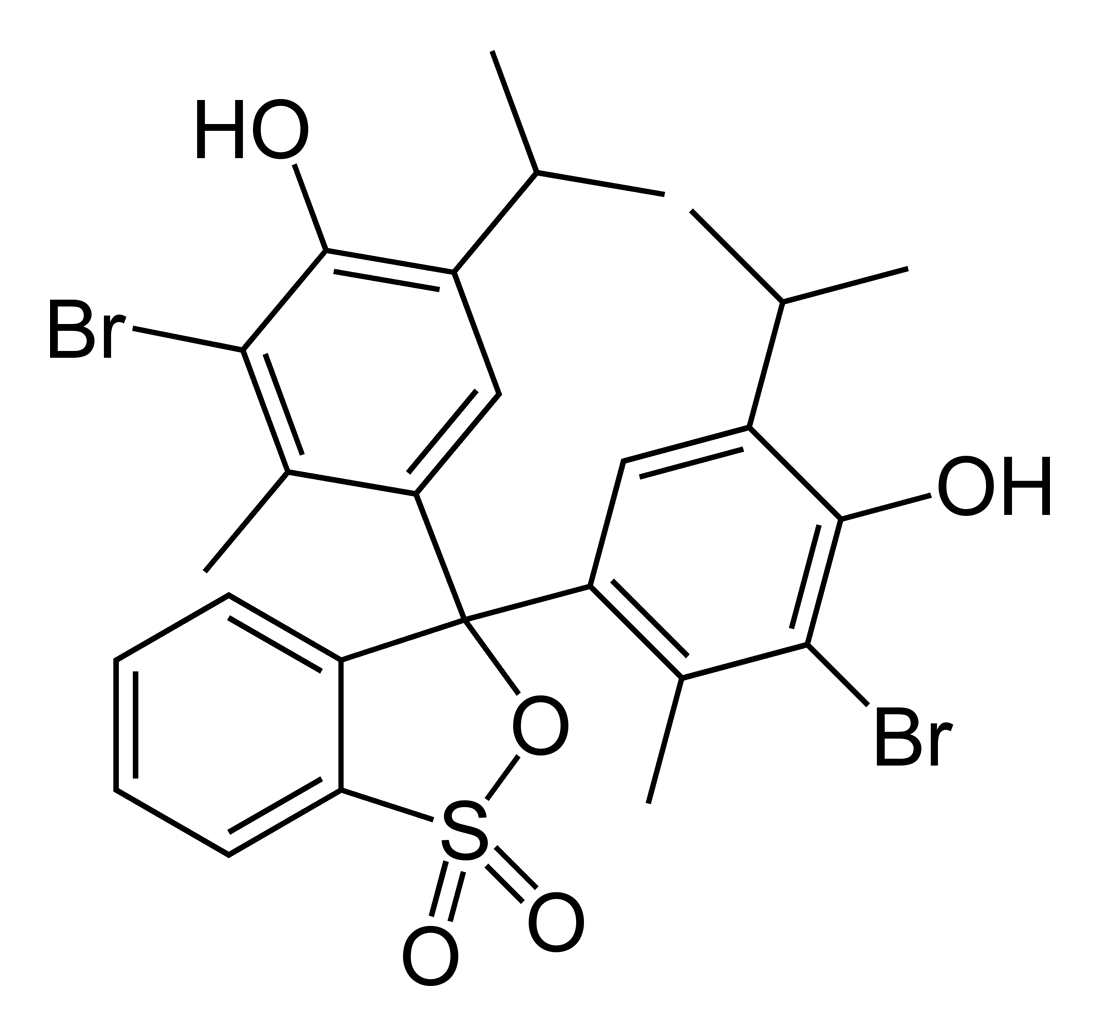

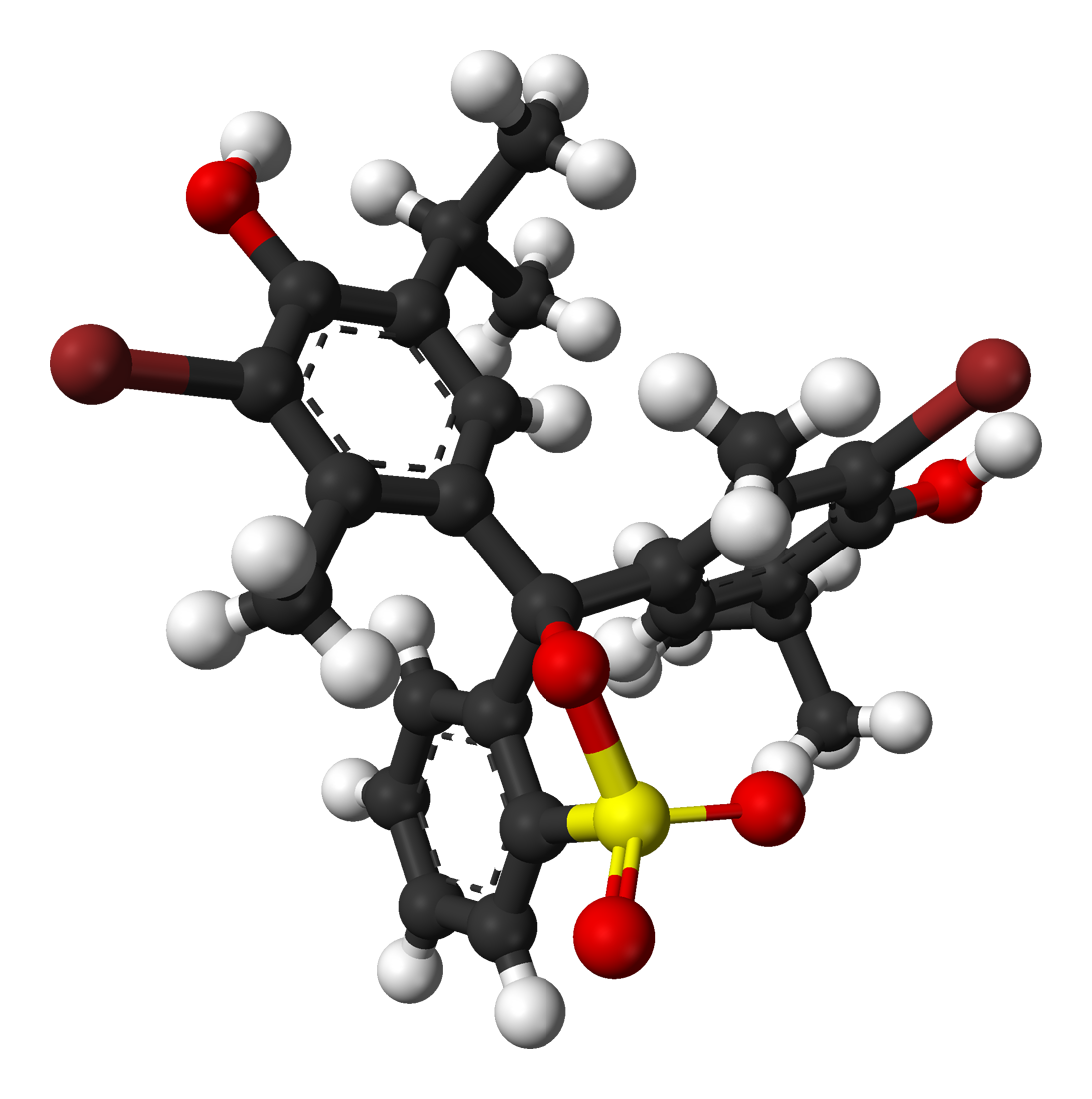

Names
- Preferred IUPAC name 3,3-Bis[3-bromo-4-hydroxy-2-methyl-5-(propan-2-yl)phenyl]-2,1λ^{6}-benzoxathiole-1,1(3H)-dione

Identifiers
CAS Number	76-59-5
3D model (JSmol)	Interactive image
ChEBI	CHEBI:86155
ChEMBL	ChEMBL3392578
ChemSpider	6208
ECHA InfoCard	100.000.884
EC Number	200-971-2
PubChem CID	6450
UNII	VGU4LM0H96
CompTox Dashboard (EPA)	DTXSID3058799
- InChI: InChI=1S/C27H28Br2O5S/c1-13(2)17-11-20(15(5)23(28)25(17)30)27(19-9-7-8-10-22(19)35(32,33)34-27)21-12-18(14(3)4)26(31)24(29)16(21)6/h7-14,30-31H,1-6H3 Key: NUHCTOLBWMJMLX-UHFFFAOYSA-N; InChI=1/C27H28Br2O5S/c1-13(2)17-11-20(15(5)23(28)25(17)30)27(19-9-7-8-10-22(19)35(32,33)34-27)21-12-18(14(3)4)26(31)24(29)16(21)6/h7-14,30-31H,1-6H3 Key: NUHCTOLBWMJMLX-UHFFFAOYAD
- SMILES: Brc1c(O)c(cc(c1C)C3(OS(=O)(=O)c2ccccc23)c4cc(c(O)c(Br)c4C)C(C)C)C(C)C

Properties
Chemical formula	C_{27}H_{28}Br_{2}O_{5}S
Molar mass	624.38 g·mol^{−1}
Density	1.25 g/cm^{3}
Melting point	202 °C (396 °F; 475 K)
Solubility in water	Sparingly soluble in water
Acidity (pK_{a})	7.0

Hazards
- GHS labelling
Pictograms	(GHS07: Exclamation mark)
Signal word	Warning
Hazard statements	H302, H315, H319
Precautionary statements	P264, P270, P280, P301+P312, P302+P352, P305+P351+P338, P321, P330, P332+P313, P337+P313, P362, P501
NFPA 704 (fire diamond)	2 1 0
Safety data sheet (SDS)	ThermoFisher Scientific
- Except where otherwise noted, data are given for materials in their standard state (at 25 °C [77 °F], 100 kPa). verify (what is ?) Infobox references

Bromothymol blue (also known as bromothymol sulfone phthalein and BTB) is a pH indicator. It is mostly used in applications that require measuring substances that would have a relatively neutral pH (near 7). A common use is for measuring the presence of carbonic acid in a liquid. It is typically sold in solid form as the sodium salt of the acid indicator.

== Structure and properties ==
Bromothymol blue (pH indicator)
below pH 6.0		above pH 7.6
(yellow) 6.0	⇌	7.6 (blue)

Bromothymol blue acts as a weak acid in a solution. It can thus be in protonated or deprotonated form, appearing yellow or blue, respectively. It is bright aquamarine by itself, and greenish-blue in a neutral solution. The deprotonation of the neutral form results in a highly conjugated structure, accounting for the difference in color. An intermediate of the deprotonation mechanism is responsible for the greenish color in neutral solution.

The protonated form of bromothymol blue has its peak absorption at 427 nm thus transmitting yellow light in acidic solutions, while the deprotonated form has its peak absorption at 602 nm thus transmitting blue light in more basic solutions. In contrast, highly acidic bromothymol blue is magenta in color.

The general carbon skeleton of bromothymol blue is common to many indicators including chlorophenol red, thymol blue, and bromocresol green.

The presence of one moderate electron-withdrawing group (bromine atom) and two moderate donating groups (alkyl substituents) is responsible for bromothymol blue's active indication range from a pH of 6.0 to 7.6. While the conjugation is responsible for the length and nature of the color change range, these substituent groups are ultimately responsible for the indicator's active range.

Yellow acidic form (left) and blue basic form (right) of bromothymol blue.

Bromothymol blue is sparingly soluble in oil, but soluble in water, ether, and aqueous solutions of alkalis. It is less soluble in nonpolar solvents such as benzene, toluene, and xylene, and practically insoluble in petroleum ether.

== Synthesis and preparation ==
Bromothymol blue is synthesized by addition of elemental bromine to thymol blue in a solution in glacial acetic acid.

To prepare a solution for use as pH indicator, dissolve 0.10 g in 8.0 cm^{3} N/50 (0.02 Normal) NaOH and dilute with water to 250 cm^{3}. To prepare a solution for use as indicator in volumetric work, dissolve 0.1 g in 100 cm^{3} of 50% (v/v) ethanol.

== Uses ==
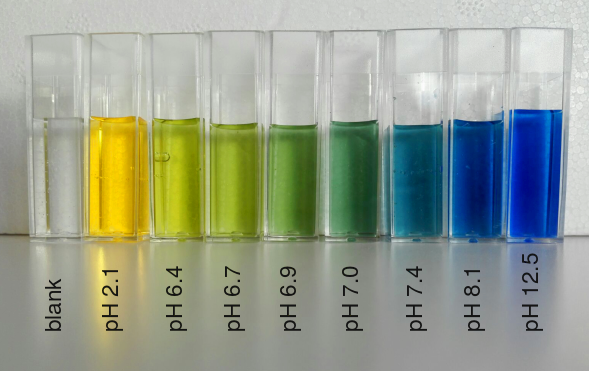
Different colors of bromothymol blue at marked pH conditions.

Bromothymol blue may be used for observing photosynthetic activities, or as a respiratory indicator (turns yellow as CO_{2} is added). A common demonstration of BTB's pH indicator properties involves exhaling through a tube into a neutral solution of BTB. As CO_{2} is absorbed from the breath into the solution, carbonic acid forms and change the solution color from green to yellow. Thus, BTB is commonly used in science classes to demonstrate that the more that muscles are used, the greater the CO_{2} output.

Bromothymol blue has been used in conjunction with phenol red to monitor the fungal asparaginase enzyme activity with phenol red turning pink and bromothymol blue turning blue signalling an increase in pH and therefore enzyme activity. However, a recent study suggests that methyl red is more useful in determining activity due to the bright yellow ring formed in the zone of enzyme activity.

It may also be used in the laboratory as a biological slide stain. At this point, the bromothymol is already blue, and a few drops of BTB are used on a water slide. The specimen is mixed with blue BTB solution and fixed to a slide by a cover slip. It is sometimes used to determine cell walls or nuclei under the microscope.

Bromothymol is used in obstetrics for detecting premature rupture of membranes. Amniotic fluid typically has a pH > 7.2, bromothymol will therefore turn blue when brought in contact with fluid leaking from the amnion. As vaginal pH normally is acidic, the blue color indicates the presence of amniotic fluid. The test may be false-positive in the presence of other alkaline substances such as blood or semen, or in the presence of bacterial vaginosis.

== See also ==
- pH indicator
- Litmus
- Phenolphthalein
- Methyl orange
- Thymolphthalexone
- Universal indicator
