= Phenolphthalein =

pH indicator that turns pink in basic solution

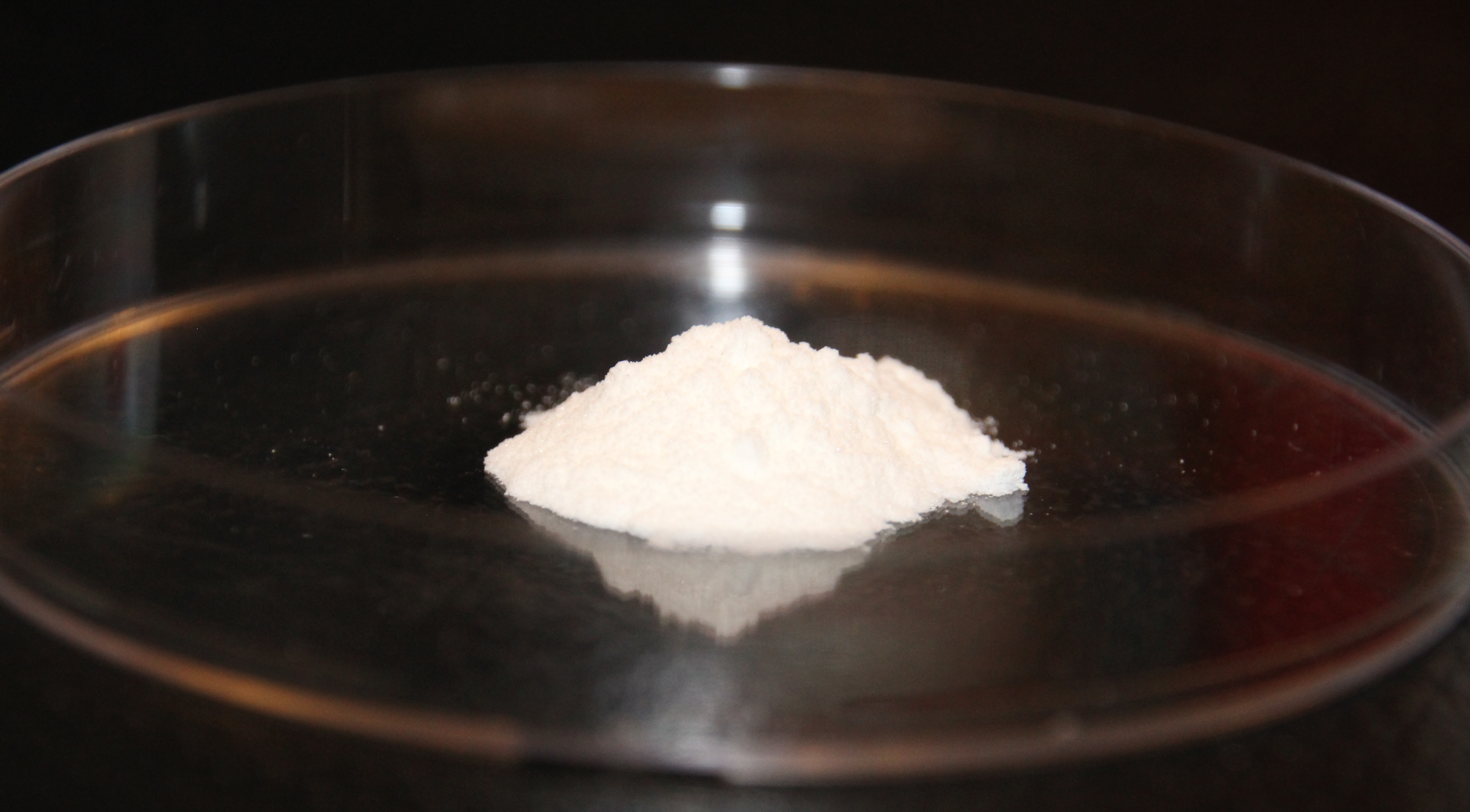

Names
- Preferred IUPAC name 3,3-Bis(4-hydroxyphenyl)-2-benzofuran-1(3H)-one
- Other names 3,3-Bis(4-hydroxyphenyl)isobenzofuran-1(3H)-one

Identifiers
CAS Number	77-09-8
3D model (JSmol)	Interactive image
ChEMBL	ChEMBL63857
ChemSpider	4600
DrugBank	DB04824
ECHA InfoCard	100.000.914
KEGG	D05456
PubChem CID	4764
UNII	6QK969R2IF
CompTox Dashboard (EPA)	DTXSID0021125
- InChI: InChI=1S/C20H14O4/c21-15-9-5-13(6-10-15)20(14-7-11-16(22)12-8-14)18-4-2-1-3-17(18)19(23)24-20/h1-12,21-22H Key: KJFMBFZCATUALV-UHFFFAOYSA-N; InChI=1/C20H14O4/c21-15-9-5-13(6-10-15)20(14-7-11-16(22)12-8-14)18-4-2-1-3-17(18)19(23)24-20/h1-12,21-22H Key: KJFMBFZCATUALV-UHFFFAOYAH
- SMILES: O=C1OC(C2=C1C=CC=C2)(C3=CC=C(C=C3)O[H])C4=CC=C(C=C4)O[H]

Properties
Chemical formula	C_{20}H_{14}O_{4}
Molar mass	318.328 g·mol^{−1}
Appearance	White powder
Density	1.277 g/cm^{3} (32 °C (90 °F))
Melting point	258–263 °C (496–505 °F; 531–536 K)
Solubility in water	400 mg/l
Solubility in other solvents	Insoluble in benzene and hexane; very soluble in ethanol and ether; slightly soluble in DMSO
UV-vis (λ_{max})	552 nm (1st); 374 nm (2nd)

Pharmacology
ATC code	A06AB04 (WHO)

Hazards
- GHS labelling
Pictograms	(GHS08: Health hazard)
Signal word	Danger
Hazard statements	H341, H350, H361
Precautionary statements	P201, P281, P308+P313
NFPA 704 (fire diamond)	2 3 0
- Except where otherwise noted, data are given for materials in their standard state (at 25 °C [77 °F], 100 kPa). verify (what is ?) Infobox references

Phenolphthalein (/fɛˈnɒl(f)θəliːn/ feh-NOL(F)-thə-leen) is a chemical compound with the formula C_{20}H_{14}O_{4}. The compound, often written as "HIn", "HPh", "phph" or simply "Ph" in shorthand notation, is composed of carbon, hydrogen, and oxygen. Phenolphthalein is often used as an indicator in acid–base titrations. For this application, it turns colorless in acidic solutions and pink in basic solutions. It belongs to the class of dyes known as phthalein dyes.

Phenolphthalein is slightly soluble in water and usually is dissolved in alcohols in experiments. It is a weak acid, which can lose H^{+} ions in solution. The nonionized phenolphthalein molecule is colorless and the double deprotonated phenolphthalein ion is fuchsia. Further addition of hydroxide in higher pH occurs slowly and leads to a colorless form, since the conjugated system is broken. Phenolphthalein in concentrated sulfuric acid is orange-red due to protonation and creation of a stabilised trityl cation.

== Uses ==
=== pH indicator ===
Phenolphthalein (pH indicator)
below pH 8.3		above pH 10.0
(colorless) 8.3	⇌	10.0 (magenta)

Phenolphthalein's common use is as an indicator in acid-base titrations. It also serves as a component of universal indicator, together with methyl red, bromothymol blue, and thymol blue.

Phenolphthalein adopts different forms in aqueous solution depending on the pH of the solution. Inconsistency exists in the literature about hydrated forms of the compounds and the color of sulfuric acid. Wittke reported in 1983 that it exists in protonated form (H_{3}In^{+}) under strongly acidic conditions, providing an orange coloration.

The lactone form (H_{2}In) is colorless and dominates between strongly acidic and slightly basic conditions. The doubly deprotonated (In^{2-}) phenolate form (the anion form of phenol) gives the familiar pink color. In strongly basic solutions, phenolphthalein is converted to its In(OH)^{3−} form, and its pink color undergoes a rather slow fading reaction and becomes completely colorless when pH is greater than 13.

The pK_{a} values of phenolphthalein were found to be 9.05, 9.50 and 12 while those of phenolsulfonphthalein are 1.2 and 7.70. The pK_{a} for the color change is 9.50.

Species	H_{3}In^{+}	H_{2}In	In^{2−}	In(OH)^{3−}
Structure				
Model				
pH	<−1 in H_{2}SO_{4}	0–8.3	8.3–10.0	>12
Conditions	strongly acidic	acidic or near-neutral	basic	strongly basic
Color	orange	colorless	pink to fuchsia	colorless
Image				

An animation of the pH-dependent reaction mechanism: H_{3}In^{+} → H_{2}In → In^{2−} → In(OH)^{3−}

==== Carbonation of concrete ====
Phenolphthalein's pH sensitivity is exploited in other applications: concrete has naturally high pH due to the calcium hydroxide formed when Portland cement reacts with water. As the concrete reacts with carbon dioxide in the atmosphere, pH decreases to 8.5–9. When a 1% phenolphthalein solution is applied to normal concrete, it turns bright pink. However, if it remains colorless, it shows that the concrete has undergone carbonation. In a similar application, some spackling used to repair holes in drywall contains phenolphthalein. When applied, the basic spackling material retains a pink color; when the spackling has cured by reaction with atmospheric carbon dioxide, the pink color fades.

==== Education ====
In a highly basic solution, phenolphthalein's slow change from pink to colorless as it is converted to its Ph(OH)^{3−} form is used in chemistry classes for the study of reaction kinetics.

==== Entertainment ====
Phenolphthalein is used in toys, for example as a component of disappearing inks, or disappearing dye on the "Hollywood Hair" Barbie hair. In the ink, it is mixed with sodium hydroxide, which reacts with carbon dioxide in the air. This reaction leads to the pH falling below the color change threshold as hydrogen ions are released by the reaction:

OH^{−}_{(aq)} + CO_{2}_{(g)} → CO^{2−}_{3}_{(aq)} + H^{+}_{(aq)}.

To develop the hair and "magic" graphical patterns, the ink is sprayed with a solution of hydroxide, which leads to the appearance of the hidden graphics by the same mechanism described above for color change in alkaline solution. The pattern will eventually disappear again because of the reaction with carbon dioxide. Thymolphthalein is used for the same purpose and in the same way, when a blue color is desired.

==== Detection of blood ====
A reduced form of phenolphthalein, phenolphthalin, which is colorless, is used in a test to identify substances thought to contain blood, commonly known as the Kastle–Meyer test. A dry sample is collected with a swab or filter paper. A few drops of alcohol, then a few drops of phenolphthalin, and finally a few drops of hydrogen peroxide are dripped onto the sample. If the sample contains hemoglobin, it will turn pink immediately upon addition of the peroxide, because of the generation of phenolphthalein. A positive test indicates the sample contains hemoglobin and, therefore, is likely blood. A false positive can result from the presence of substances with catalytic activity similar to hemoglobin. This test is not destructive to the sample; it can be kept and used in further tests. This test has the same reaction with blood from any animal whose blood contains hemoglobin, including almost all vertebrates; further testing would be required to determine whether it originated from a human.

=== Laxative ===
Phenolphthalein has been used for over a century as a laxative, but is now being removed from over-the-counter laxatives over concerns of carcinogenicity. Laxative products formerly containing phenolphthalein have often been reformulated with alternative active ingredients: Feen-a-Mint switched to bisacodyl, and Ex-Lax was switched to a senna extract.

Thymolphthalein is a related laxative made from thymol.

Despite concerns regarding its carcinogenicity based on rodent studies, the use of phenolphthalein as a laxative is unlikely to cause ovarian cancer. Some studies suggest a weak association with colon cancer, while others show none at all.

Phenolphthalein is described as a stimulant laxative. In addition, it has been found to inhibit human cellular calcium influx via store-operated calcium entry (SOCE, see Calcium release activated channel § Structure) in vivo. This is effected by its inhibiting thrombin and thapsigargin, two activators of SOCE that increase intracellular free calcium.

Phenolphthalein has been added to the European Chemicals Agency's candidate list for substance of very high concern (SVHC). It is on the IARC group 2B list for substances "possibly carcinogenic to humans".

The discovery of phenolphthalein's laxative effect was due to an attempt by the Hungarian government to label genuine local white wine with the substance in 1900. Phenolphthalein did not change the taste of the wine and would change color when a base is added, making it a good label in principle. However, it was found that ingestion of the substance led to diarrhea. Max Kiss, a Hungarian-born pharmacist residing in New York, heard about the news and launched Ex-Lax in 1906.

== Synthesis ==
Phenolphthalein can be synthesized by condensation of phthalic anhydride with two equivalents of phenol under acidic conditions. It was discovered in 1871 by Adolf von Baeyer.

Synthesis of phenolphthalein

== See also ==
- Bromothymol blue
- Litmus
- Methyl orange
- pH indicator
- Thymolphthalexone
- Universal indicator
