= Methyl orange =

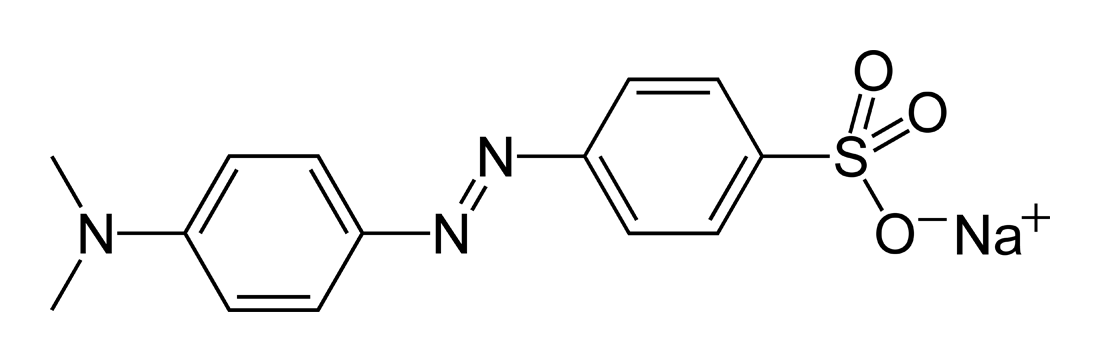

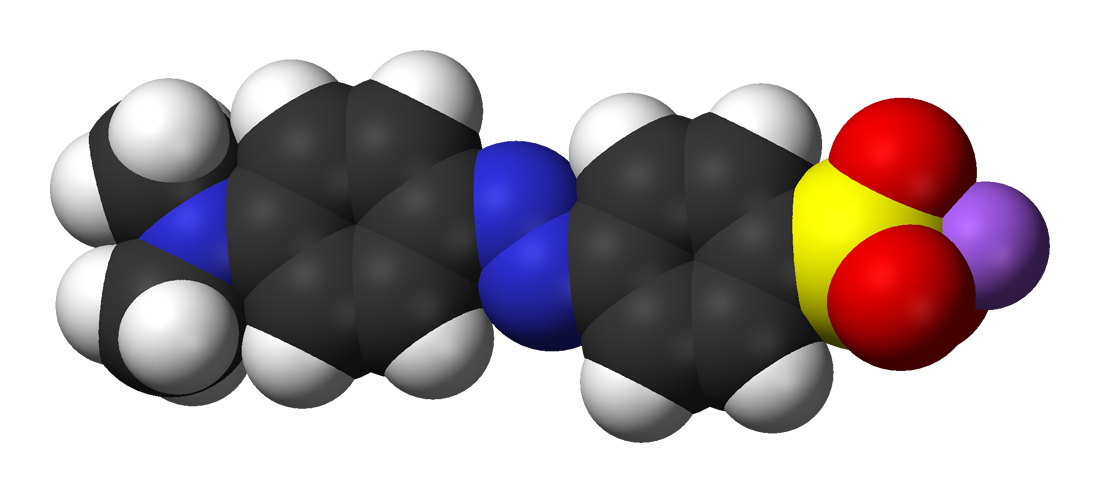

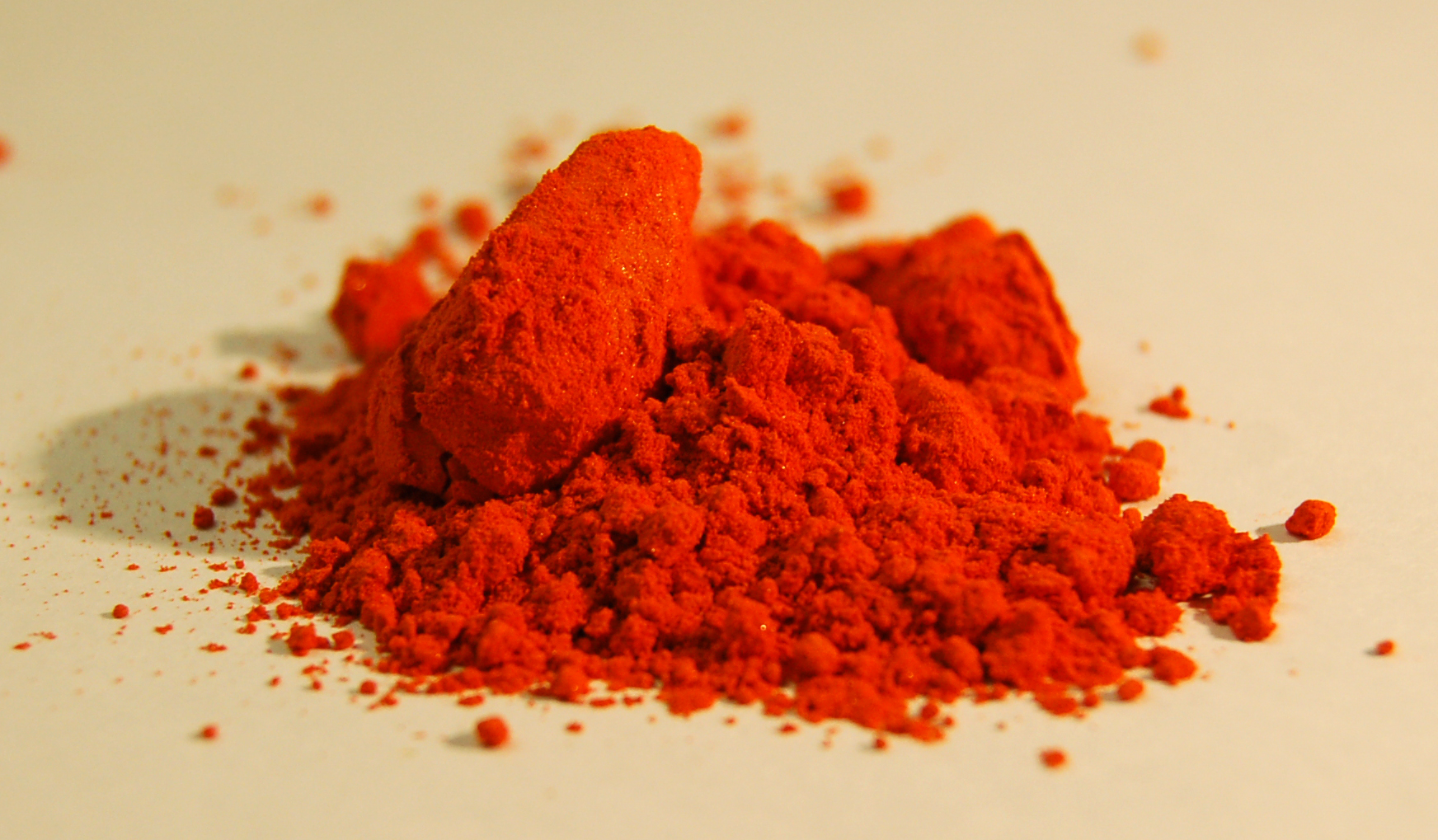

Names
- Preferred IUPAC name Sodium 4-{[4-(dimethylamino)phenyl]diazenyl}benzene-1-sulfonate
- Other names: Sodium 4-[(4-dimethylamino)phenylazo]benzenesulfonate; Helianthine

Identifiers
CAS Number	547-58-0
3D model (JSmol)	Interactive image
ChemSpider	16736152
ECHA InfoCard	100.008.115
EC Number	208-925-3
PubChem CID	23673835
UNII	6B4TC34456
UN number	3143
CompTox Dashboard (EPA)	DTXSID60883437
- InChI: InChI=1S/C14H15N3O3S.Na/c1-17(2)13-7-3-11(4-8-13)15-16-12-5-9-14(10-6-12)21(18,19)20;/h3-10H,1-2H3,(H,18,19,20);/q;+1/p-1 Key: STZCRXQWRGQSJD-UHFFFAOYSA-M; InChI=1/C14H15N3O3S.Na/c1-17(2)13-7-3-11(4-8-13)15-16-12-5-9-14(10-6-12)21(18,19)20;/h3-10H,1-2H3,(H,18,19,20);/q;+1/p-1 Key: STZCRXQWRGQSJD-REWHXWOFAG
- SMILES: [Na+].CN(C)c2ccc(/N=N/c1ccc(cc1)S([O-])(=O)=O)cc2

Properties
Chemical formula	C_{14}H_{14}N_{3}NaO_{3}S
Molar mass	327.33 g·mol^{−1}
Appearance	Orange or yellow solid
Density	1.28 g/cm^{3}
Melting point	> 300 °C (572 °F; 573 K) (not precisely defined)
Boiling point	Decomposes
Solubility in water	5 g/L (20 °C)
Solubility in diethyl ether	Insoluble

Hazards
- Occupational safety and health (OHS/OSH)
Main hazards	Toxic (T)
- GHS labelling
Pictograms	(GHS06: Toxic)
Signal word	Danger
Hazard statements	H301
Precautionary statements	P308, P310
NFPA 704 (fire diamond)	1 0 0
- Lethal dose or concentration (LD, LC)
LD_{50} (median dose)	60 mg/kg (rat, oral)
- Except where otherwise noted, data are given for materials in their standard state (at 25 °C [77 °F], 100 kPa). verify (what is ?) Infobox references

Methyl Orange

Color coordinates
- Hex triplet: #E32600
- sRGB^{B} (r, g, b): (227, 38, 0)
- HSV (h, s, v): (10°, 100%, 89%)
- CIELCh_{uv} (L, C, h): (49, 151, 14°)
- Source: Color Meanings
- B: Normalized to [0–255] (byte)

Methyl orange is a pH indicator frequently used in titration because of its clear and distinct color variance at different pH values. Methyl orange shows red color in acidic medium and yellow color in basic medium. Because it changes color at the pK_{a} of a mid strength acid, it is usually used in titration of strong acids in weak bases that reach the equivalence point at a pH of 3.1-4.4. Unlike a universal indicator, methyl orange does not have a full spectrum of color change, but it has a sharp end point. In a solution becoming less acidic, methyl orange changes from red to orange and, finally, to yellow—with the reverse process occurring in a solution of increasing acidity.

== Synthesis ==
Methyl orange is an azobenzene derivative that can be formed from dimethylaniline and sulfanilic acid, first through a diazonium salt formation with the sulfanilic acid, followed by a nucleophilic attack from the dimethylaniline and rearomatization.

== UV-vis spectrum ==
The absorption of methyl orange the UV-vis spectrum is between 350 and 550 nm, with its peak at 510 nm (protonated) or 458 nm (deprotonated). This is in the green-cyan visible light range and explains why methyl orange is, in fact, orange.

== Safety ==
Methyl orange has mutagenic properties. When methyl orange is put under oxidative stress, one of the double-bonded nitrogen atoms that connects the aromatic rings gets radicalized and can further break down into reactive oxygen species or anilines, which are carcinogenic and can mutate DNA. Various bacteria and enzymes can also cause this breakdown to occur.

== Indicator colors ==
In a solution that decreases in acidity, methyl orange moves from the color red to orange and finally to yellow with the opposite occurring for a solution increasing in acidity. This color change from yellow to red occurs because the protons in the acidic solution react with the N=N bond of the molecule, protonating one of them and changing the visible light absorption of the molecule to transmit more red light than orange/yellow (i.e. to absorb more cyan light than blue).

In an acid, it is reddish and in alkali, it is yellow. Methyl orange has a pK_{a} of 3.47 in water at 25 °C (77 °F).

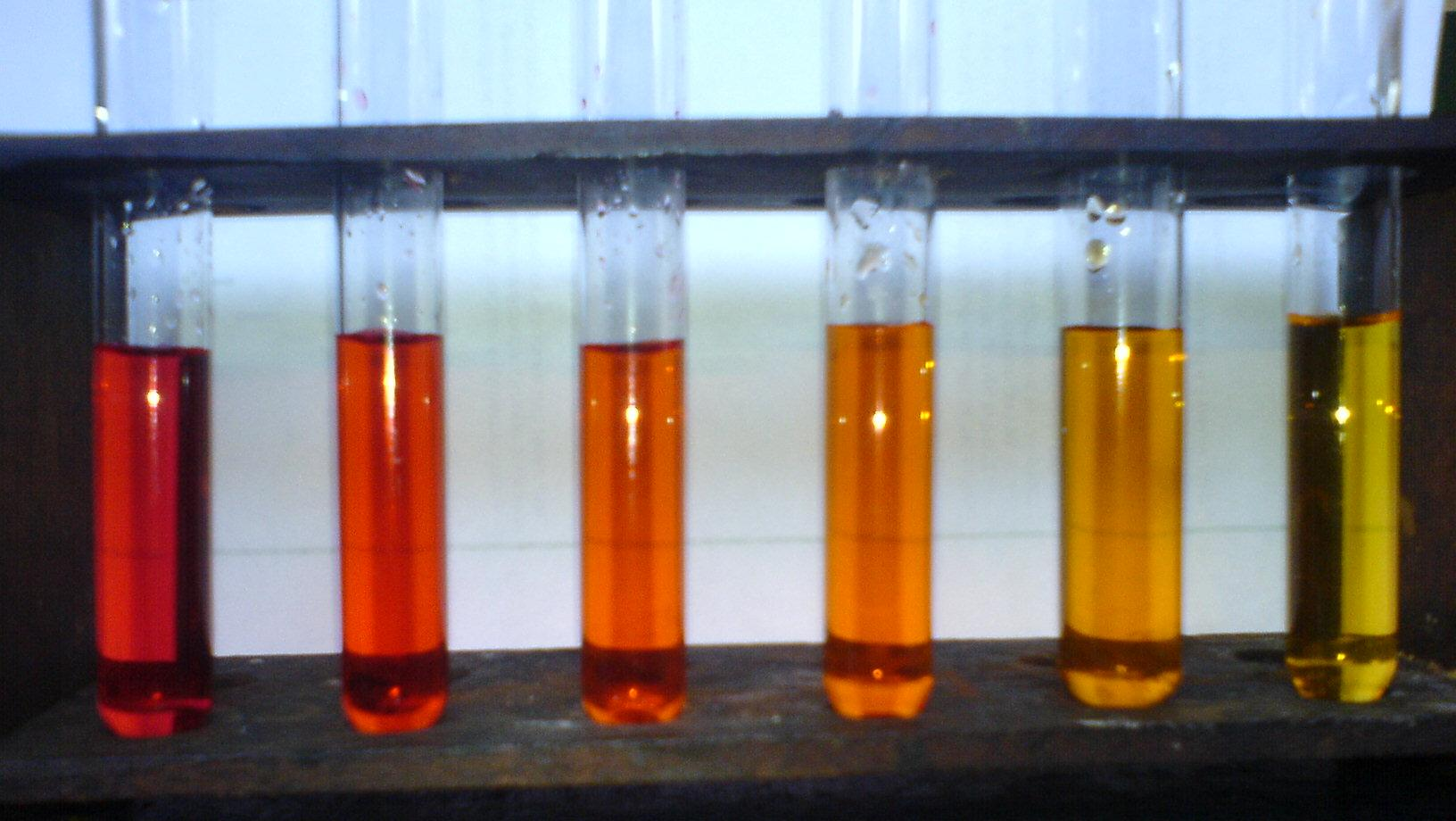
Methyl orange solutions

Methyl orange (pH indicator)
below pH 3.1		above pH 4.4
(red) 3.1	⇌	4.4 (yellow)

== Other indicators ==
Modified (or screened) methyl orange, an indicator consisting of a solution of methyl orange and xylene cyanol, changes from grey-violet to green as the solution becomes more basic.

Methyl orange in xylene cyanol solution (pH indicator)
below pH 3.2		above pH 4.2
(purple) 3.2	⇌	4.2 (green)

== See also ==
- Bromothymol blue
- Chrysophenine
- Congo red
- Litmus
- Methyl red
- pH indicator
- Phenolphthalein
- Sulfarsazene
- Universal indicator
