= Thymol blue =

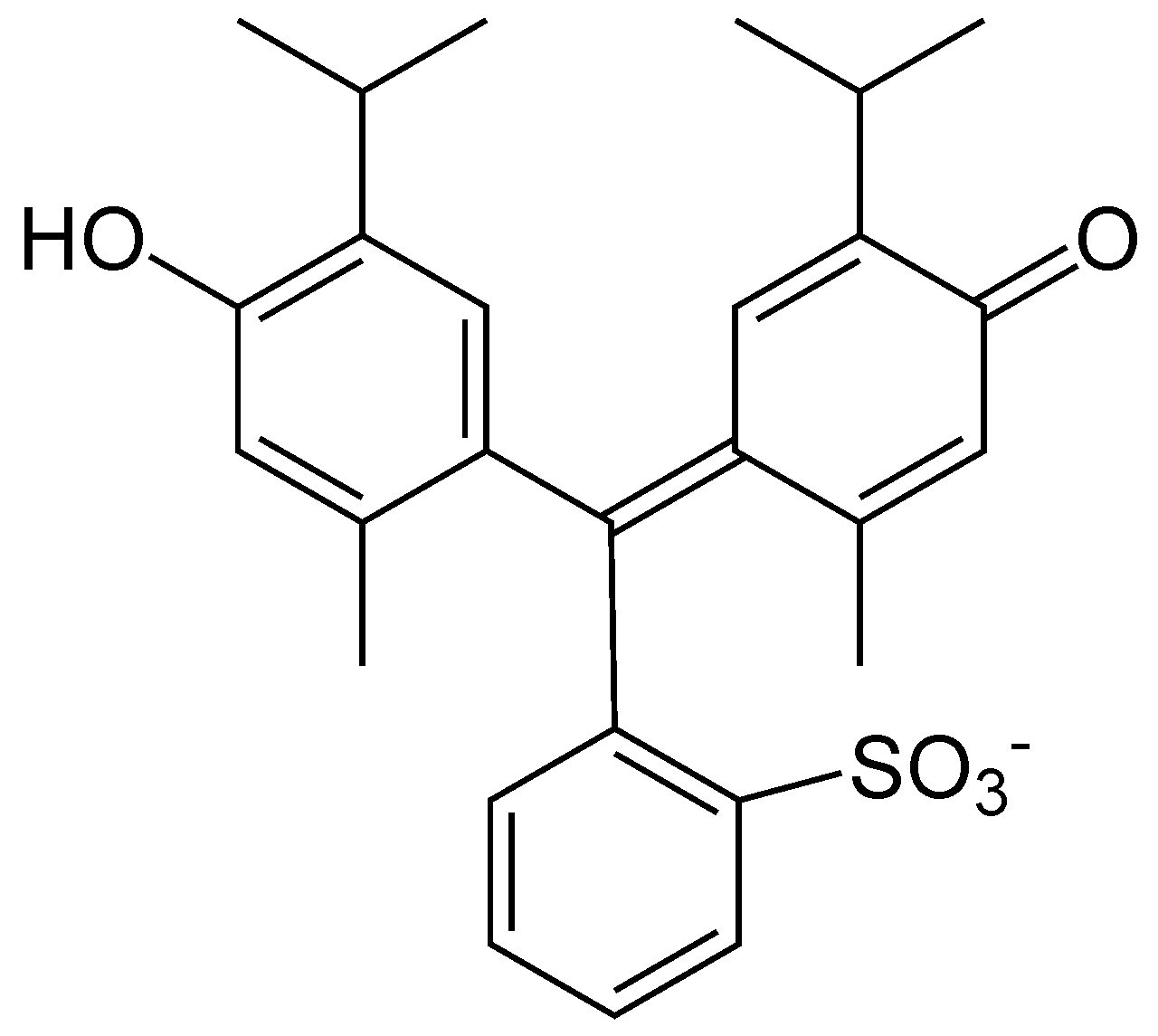

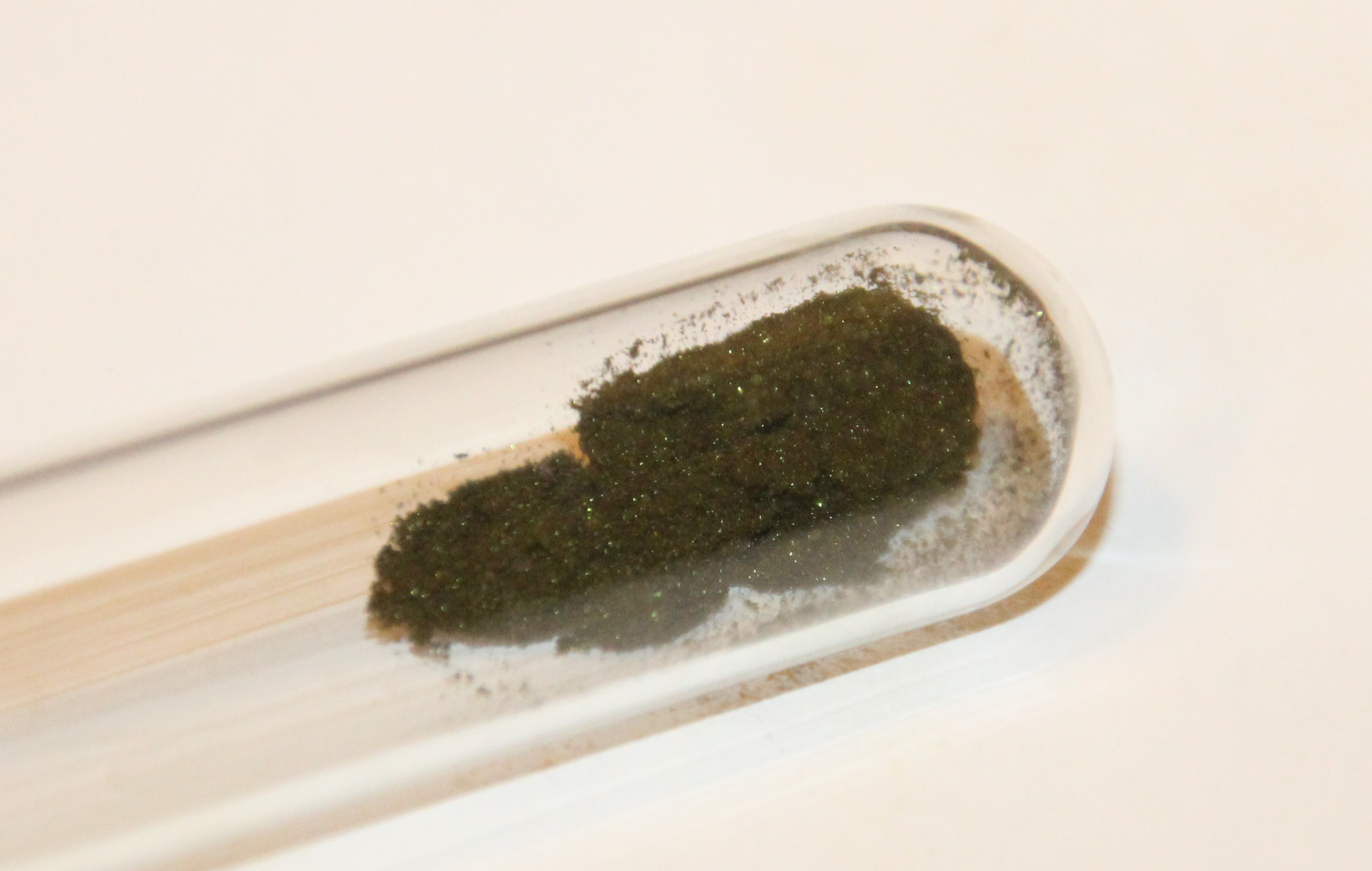

Names
- Preferred IUPAC name 3,3-Bis[4-hydroxy-2-methyl-5-(propan-2-yl)phenyl]-2,1λ^{6}-benzoxathiole-1,1(3H)-dione
- Other names: α-hydroxy-α,α-bis(5-hydroxycarvacryl)- o-toluenesulfonic acid γ-sultone; thymolsulfonephthalein

Identifiers
CAS Number	76-61-9
3D model (JSmol)	Interactive image
ChemSpider	59008
ECHA InfoCard	100.000.886
EC Number	200-973-3
PubChem CID	65565
UNII	8YB4804L4M
CompTox Dashboard (EPA)	DTXSID5058800
- InChI: InChI=1S/C27H30O5S/c1-15(2)19-13-22(17(5)11-24(19)28)27(21-9-7-8-10-26(21)33(30,31)32-27)23-14-20(16(3)4)25(29)12-18(23)6/h7-16,28-29H,1-6H3 Key: PRZSXZWFJHEZBJ-UHFFFAOYSA-N; InChI=1/C27H30O5S/c1-15(2)19-13-22(17(5)11-24(19)28)27(21-9-7-8-10-26(21)33(30,31)32-27)23-14-20(16(3)4)25(29)12-18(23)6/h7-16,28-29H,1-6H3 Key: PRZSXZWFJHEZBJ-UHFFFAOYAE
- SMILES: O=S2(=O)OC(c1ccccc12)(c3cc(c(O)cc3C)C(C)C)c4cc(c(O)cc4C)C(C)C

Properties
Chemical formula	C_{27}H_{30}O_{5}S
Molar mass	466.59 g·mol^{−1}
Appearance	Brownish-green crystal powder
Melting point	221–224 °C (430–435 °F; 494–497 K) decomposes
Solubility in water	Insoluble
UV-vis (λ_{max})	594 nm (1st); 376 nm (2nd)

Hazards
- Occupational safety and health (OHS/OSH)
Main hazards	Harmful
- GHS labelling
Pictograms	(GHS07: Exclamation mark)
Signal word	Warning
Hazard statements	H302
Precautionary statements	P264, P270, P301+P312, P330, P501
NFPA 704 (fire diamond)	1 1
- Except where otherwise noted, data are given for materials in their standard state (at 25 °C [77 °F], 100 kPa). verify (what is ?) Infobox references

Thymol blue (thymolsulfonephthalein) is a brownish-green or reddish-brown crystalline powder that is used as a pH indicator. It is insoluble in water but soluble in alcohol and dilute alkali solutions.

Thymol blue (pH indicator)
below pH 8.0		above pH 9.6
(yellow) 8.0	⇌	9.6 (blue)

Thymol blue (pH indicator)
below pH 1.2		above pH 2.8
(red) 1.2	⇌	2.8 (yellow)

It transitions from red to yellow at pH 1.2–2.8 and from yellow to blue at pH 8.0–9.6. It is usually a component of universal indicator.

At wavelength (378 - 382) nm, extinction coefficient > 8000 and at wavelength (298 - 302) nm, the extinction coefficient > 12000.

== Structures ==
Thymol blue undergoes chemical changes in response to varying pH:

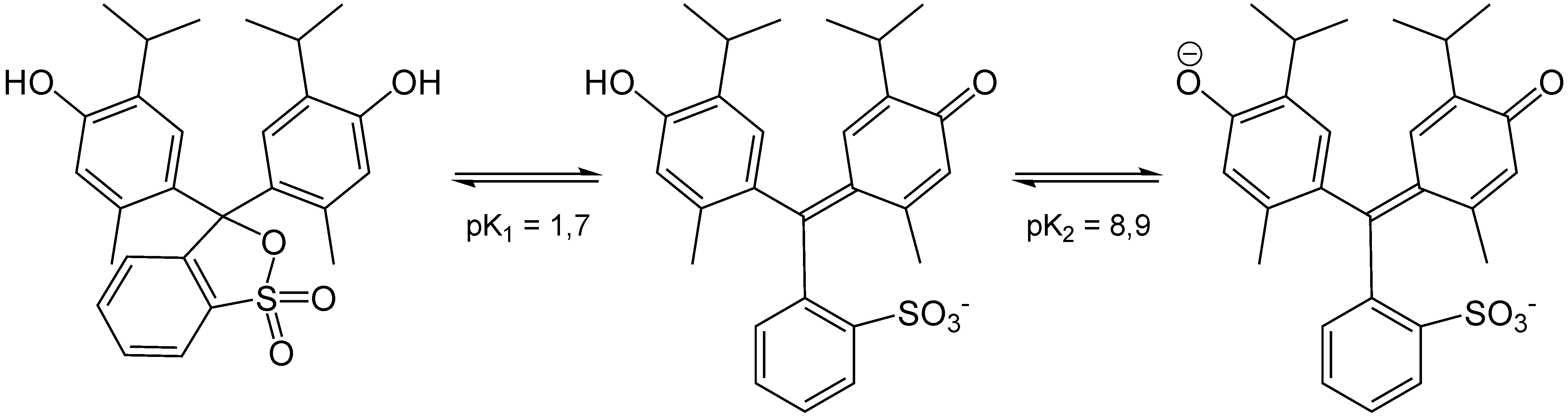
Structure of thymol blue chemical: increased pH (alkalinity) shifts this reaction further towards the right

As a result, its visible color also changes:

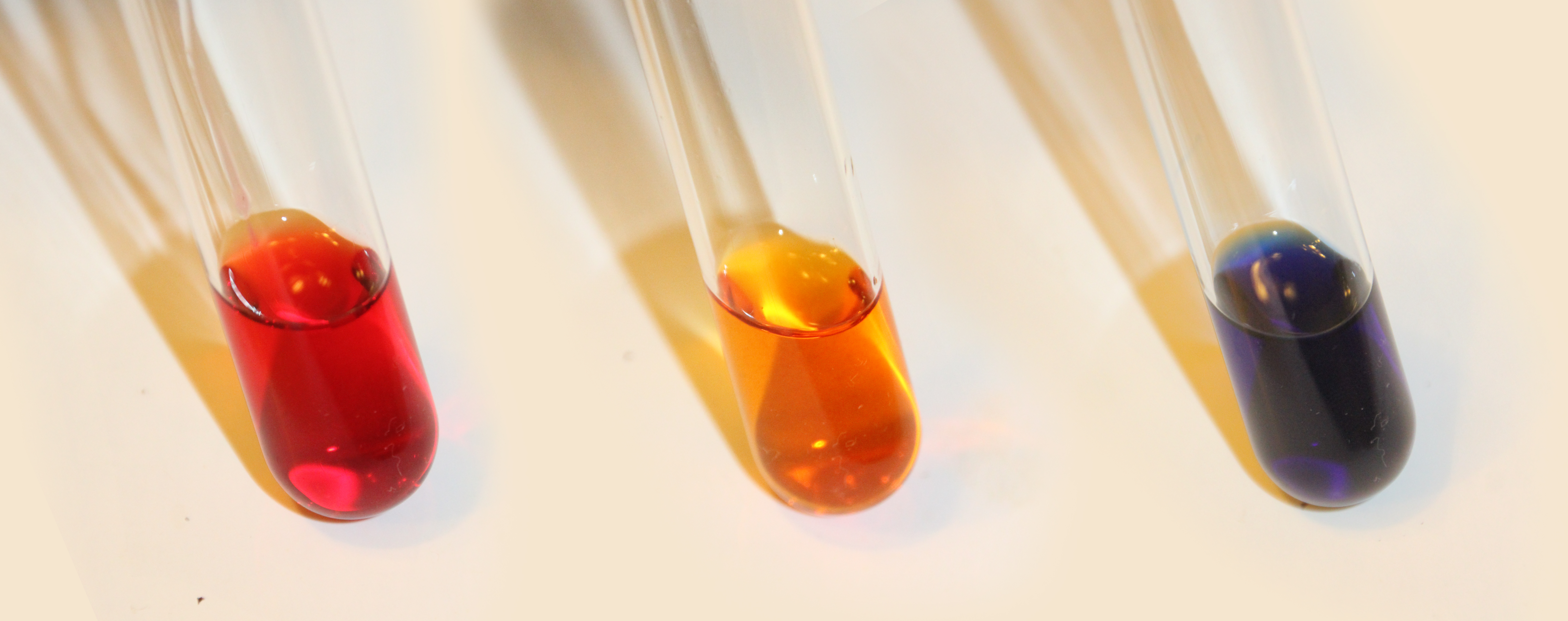
Color of thymol blue solution at different acid–base conditions: left: acidic, middle: neutral, right: alkaline

== Safety ==
It may cause irritation. Its toxicological properties have not been fully investigated. Harmful if swallowed, Acute Toxicity. Only Hazardous when percent values are above 10%.

== Bibliography ==
- Merck. "Thymol Blue." The Merck Index. 14th ed. 2006. Accessed via web on 2007-02-25.
