= Universal indicator =

Indicator that works over a wide range of pH

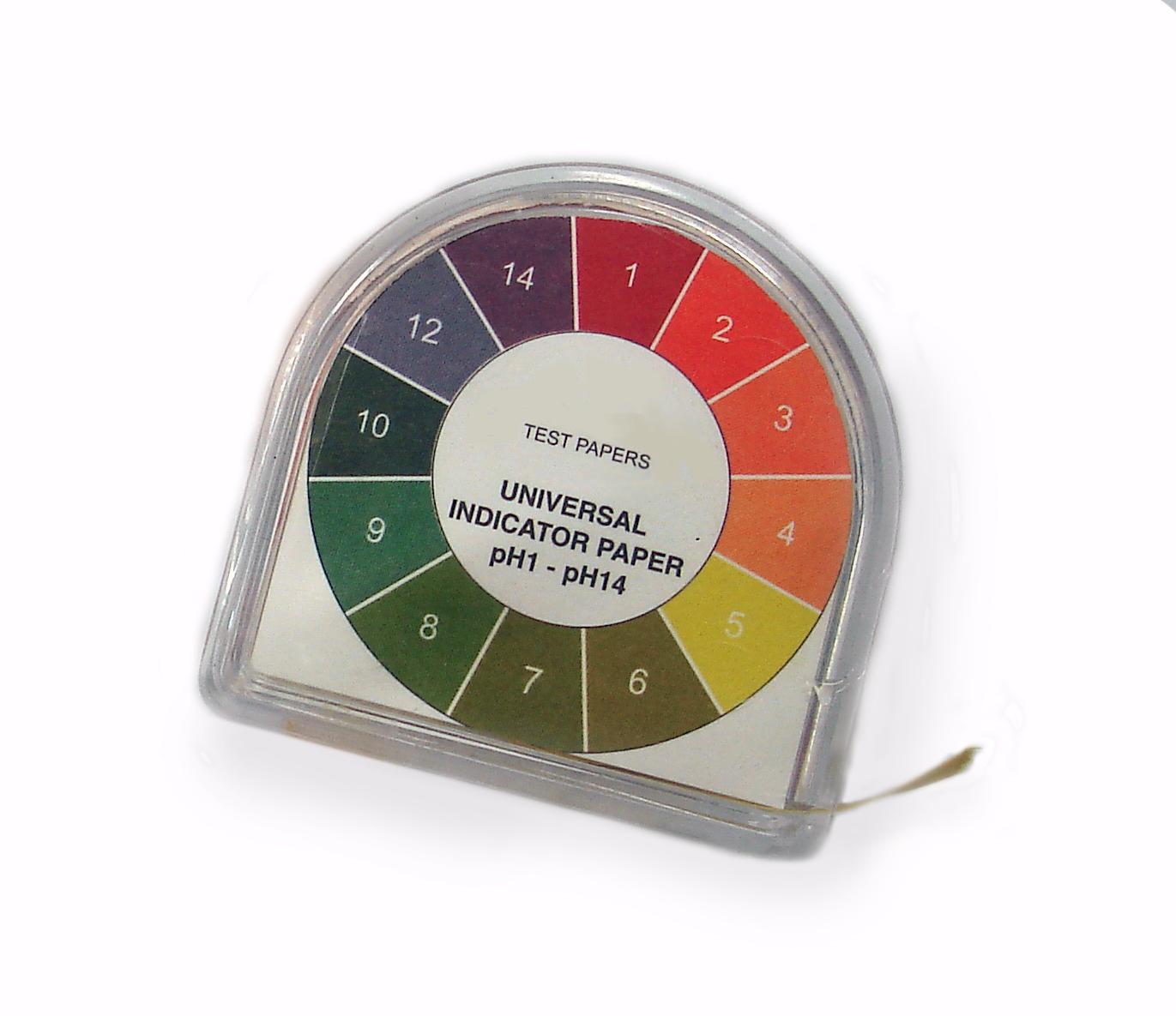
A roll of universal indicator paper

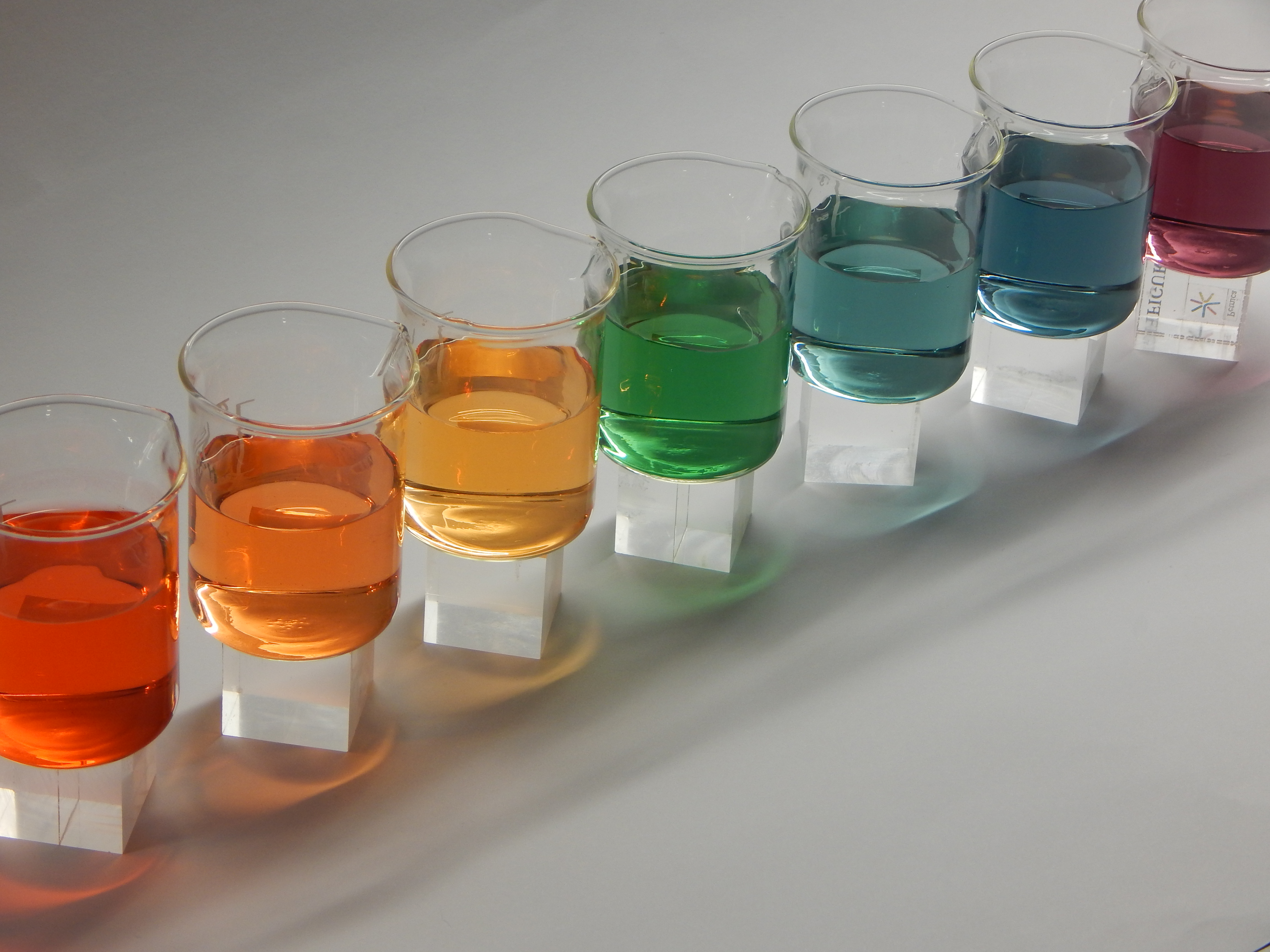
Colors of universal indicator

A universal indicator is a pH indicator made of a solution of several compounds that exhibit various smooth colour changes over a wide range pH values to indicate the acidity or alkalinity of solutions. A universal indicator can be in paper form or present in a form of a solution.

== History ==
Although there are several commercially available universal pH indicators, most are a variation of a formula patented by Yamada in 1933.

== Composition ==
A universal indicator is usually composed of water, 1-propanol, phenolphthalein, sodium hydroxide, methyl red, bromothymol blue, sodium bisulfite, and thymol blue. The colours that indicate the pH of a solution, after adding a universal indicator, are:

pH range	Description	Colour
≤ 3	Strong acid	Red
4–6	Weak acid	Orange or Yellow
7	Neutral	Green
8–10	Weak alkali	Blue
≥ 11	Strong alkali	Indigo or Violet

The colors from yellow to red indicate an acidic solution, colors blue to violet indicate an alkaline solution and a green colour indicates that a solution is neutral.

Universal indicator components
Indicator	Low pH colour	Transition pH range	High pH colour
Thymol blue (first transition)	Red	1.2 – 2.8	Yellow
Methyl orange	Red	3.2 – 4.4	Yellow
Methyl red	Red	4.8 – 6.0	Yellow
Bromothymol blue	Yellow	6.0 – 7.6	Blue
Thymol blue (second transition)	Yellow	8.0 – 9.6	Blue
Phenolphthalein	Colourless	8.3 – 10.0	Fuchsia

Wide-range pH test papers with distinct colours for each pH from 1 to 14 are also available. Colour matching charts are supplied with the specific test strips purchased.

== Types ==
- Paper form: It is a strip of coloured paper which changes colour to red if the solution is acidic and to blue, if the solution is basic. The strip can be placed directly onto a surface of a wet substance or a few drops of the solution can be dropped onto the universal indicator using dropping equipment. If the test solution is of a dark colour, it is preferable to use a paper universal indicator, such as Hydrion paper.
- Solution: The main components of a universal indicator, in the form of a solution, are thymol blue, methyl red, bromothymol blue, and phenolphthalein. This mixture is important because each component loses or gains protons depending upon the acidity or alkalinity of the solution being tested. It is beneficial to use this type of universal indicator in a colorless solution. This will increase the accuracy level of indication.

== Influence on conductivity ==
Influence of universal indicator solution on the conductivity of desalinated water

The impact of an ethanol-based universal indicator may seem negligible at first glance. However, in the case of dilute solutions prepared with bidistilled water, this influence becomes readily discernible and measurable.

== See also ==
- Litmus
- pH indicator
