= 1961 in Michigan =

- Decades: 1940s; 1950s; 1960s; 1970s; 1980s
- See also: History of Michigan; Historical outline of Michigan; List of years in Michigan; 1961 in the United States

Events from the year 1961 in Michigan.

The top stories in Michigan in 1961, as selected by Associated Press newspaper, radio, and television editors, were as follows: (1) the opening of the state's Constitutional Convention; (2) the negotiations between the United Auto Workers (UAW) and automobile manufacturers; (3) the Detroit Tigers' bid for the American League pennant with 101 wins during the 1961 season; (4) the Republican party's victory in an October 1961 election for control of the Constitutional Convention; (5) the November 7 election of Jerome Cavanagh, a 33-year-old attorney, over the incumbent, Louis Miriani, as Mayor of Detroit; (6) Chrysler Corporation's legal troubles arising from the removal of William Newberg as president and the ouster of L. L. Colbert as CEO; (7) "Tractors for Freedom", a Detroit-based campaign led by Walter Reuther, Eleanor Roosevelt, and Milton S. Eisenhower that raised money in May and June 1961 in an effort to trade 500 tractors to Cuba in exchange for the freedom of 1,214 rebel prisoners captured at the Bay of Pigs Invasion; (8) the proposal to create a national recreation area at Sleeping Bear Dunes; (9) the failed prosecution and trial of Gordon Watson and Nelle Lassiter for the murder of her husband, Parvin "Bill" Lassiter; and (10) the closure by Norge, a division of Borg-Warner, of its factory in Muskegon Heights and relocation of manufacturing operations Fort Smith, Arkansas.

== Office holders ==
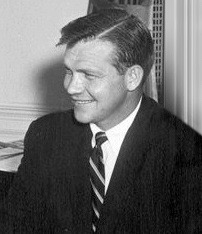
Gov Swainson

=== State office holders ===
- Governor of Michigan: John Swainson (Democrat)
- Lieutenant Governor of Michigan: T. John Lesinski (Democrat)
- Michigan Attorney General: Paul Adams/Frank J. Kelley (Democrat)
- Michigan Secretary of State: James M. Hare (Democrat)
- Speaker of the Michigan House of Representatives: Don R. Pears (Republican)
- Majority Leader of the Michigan Senate: Frank D. Beadle (Republican)
- Chief Justice, Michigan Supreme Court: John R. Dethmers

=== Mayors of major cities ===
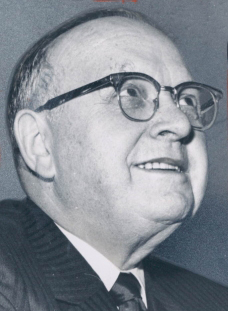
Mayor Miriani

- Mayor of Detroit: Louis Miriani
- Mayor of Grand Rapids: Stanley J. Davis
- Mayor of Warren, Michigan: Ted Bates
- Mayor of Flint: Charles A. Mobley
- Mayor of Saginaw: R. Dewey Stearns/G. Stewart Francke
- Mayor of Dearborn: Orville L. Hubbard
- Mayor of Lansing: Ralph Crego/Willard I. Bowerman, Jr. (Republican)
- Mayor of Ann Arbor: Cecil Creal

=== Federal office holders ===
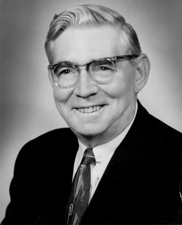
Sen. McNamara

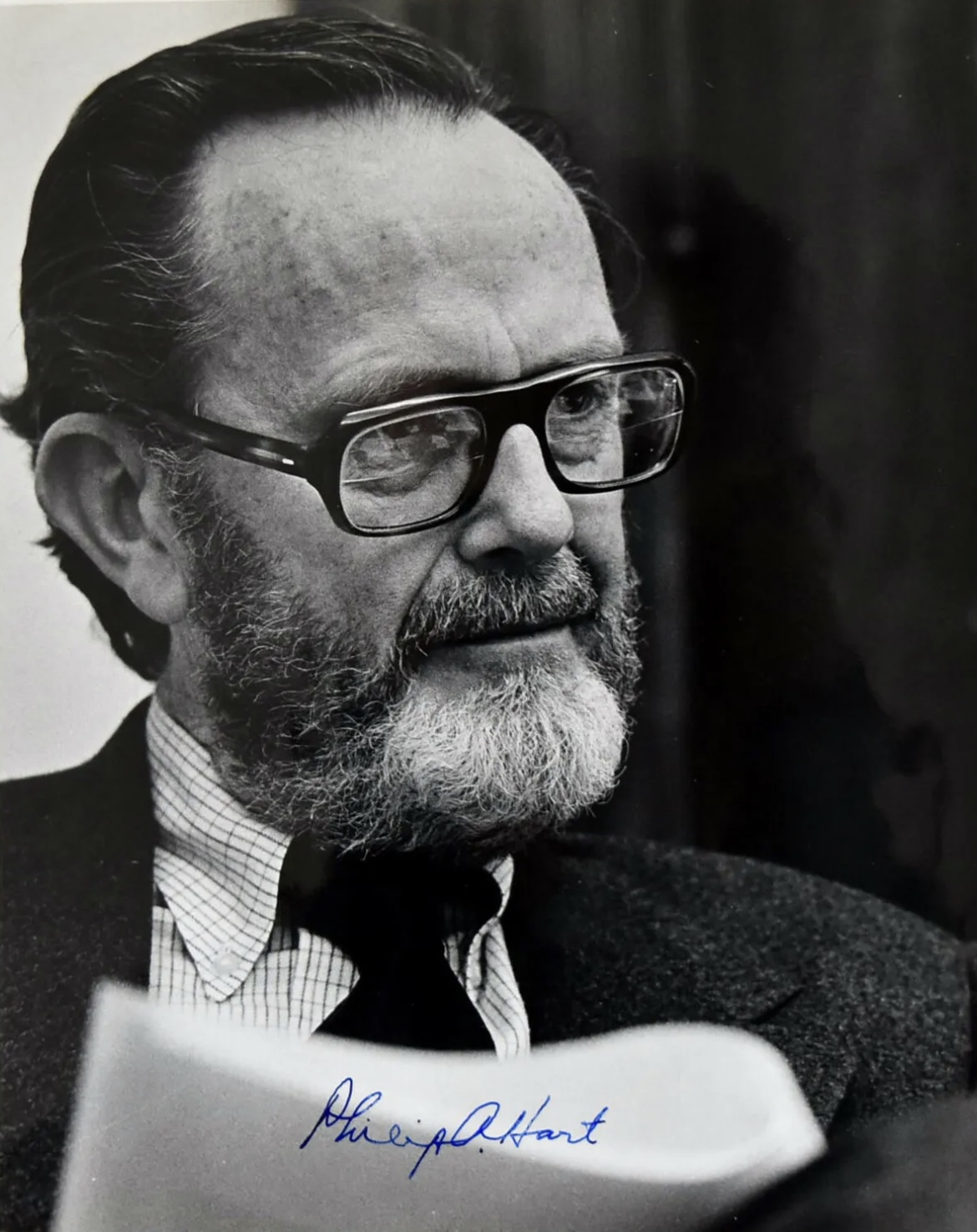
Sen. Hart

- U.S. Senator from Michigan: Patrick V. McNamara (Democrat)
- U.S. Senator from Michigan: Philip Hart (Democrat)
- House District 1: Thaddeus M. Machrowicz (Democrat)/Lucien N. Nedzi (Democrat)
- House District 2: George Meader (Republican)
- House District 3: August E. Johansen (Republican)
- House District 4: Clare Hoffman (Republican)
- House District 5: Gerald Ford (Republican)
- House District 6: Charles E. Chamberlain (Republican)
- House District 7: James G. O'Hara (Democrat)
- House District 8: R. James Harvey (Republican)
- House District 9: Robert P. Griffin (Republican)
- House District 10: Elford Albin Cederberg (Republican)
- House District 11: Victor A. Knox (Republican)
- House District 12: John B. Bennett (Republican)
- House District 13: Charles Diggs (Democrat)
- House District 14: Louis C. Rabaut (Democrat)
- House District 15: John Dingell Jr. (Democrat)
- House District 16: John Lesinski Jr. (Democrat)
- House District 17: Martha Griffiths (Democrat)
- House District 18: William Broomfield (Republican)

== Population ==
In the 1960 United States census, Michigan was recorded as having a population of 7,823,194 persons, ranking as the seventh most populous state in the country. By 1970, the state's population had grown 13.4% to 8,875,083 persons.

=== Cities ===
The following is a list of cities in Michigan with a population of at least 60,000 based on 1960 U.S. Census data. Historic census data from 1950 and 1970 is included to reflect trends in population increases or decreases. Cities that are part of the Detroit metropolitan area are shaded in tan.

1960 Rank	City	County	1950 Pop.	1960 Pop.	1970 Pop.	Change 1960-70
1	Detroit	Wayne	1,849,568	1,670,144	1,514,063	−9.3% ▼
2	Flint	Genesee	163,143	196,940	193,317	−1.8% ▼
3	Grand Rapids	Kent	176,515	177,313	197,649	11.5% ▲
4	Dearborn	Wayne	94,994	112,007	104,199	−7.0% ▼
5	Lansing	Ingham	92,129	107,807	131,403	21.9% ▲
6	Saginaw	Saginaw	92,918	98,265	91,849	−6.5% ▼
7	Warren	Macomb	42,653	89,246	179,260	100.2% ▲
8	Pontiac	Oakland	73,681	82,233	85,279	3.7% ▲
9	Kalamazoo	Kalamazoo	57,704	82,089	85,555	4.1% ▲
10	Royal Oak	Oakland	46,898	80,612	86,238	7.0% ▲
11	St. Clair Shores	Macomb	19,823	76,657	88,093	14.9% ▲
12	Ann Arbor	Washtenaw	48,251	67,340	100,035	48.6% ▲
13	Livonia	Wayne	17,634	66,702	110,109	65.1% ▲
14	Dearborn Heights	Wayne	20,235	61,118	80,069	31.0% ▲
15	Westland	Wayne	30,407	60,743	86,749	42.8% ▲

=== Counties ===
The following is a list of counties in Michigan with populations of at least 100,000 based on 1960 U.S. Census data. Historic census data from 1950 and 1970 are included to reflect trends in population increases or decreases. Counties that are part of the Detroit metropolitan area are shaded in tan.

1960 Rank	County	Largest city	1950 Pop.	1960 Pop.	1970 Pop.	Change 1960-70
1	Wayne	Detroit	2,435,235	2,666,297	2,666,751	0.0% ▲
2	Oakland	Pontiac	396,001	690,259	907,871	31.5% ▲
3	Macomb	Warren	184,961	405,804	625,309	54.1% ▲
4	Genesee	Flint	270,963	374,313	444,341	18.7% ▲
5	Kent	Grand Rapids	288,292	363,187	411,044	13.2% ▲
6	Ingham	Lansing	172,941	211,296	261,039	23.5% ▲
7	Saginaw	Saginaw	153,515	190,752	219,743	15.2% ▲
8	Washtenaw	Ann Arbor	134,606	172,440	234,103	35.8% ▲
9	Kalamazoo	Kalamazoo	126,707	169,712	201,550	18.8% ▲
10	Berrien	Benton Harbor	115,702	149,865	163,875	9.3% ▲
11	Calhoun	Battle Creek	120,813	138,858	141,963	2.2% ▲
12	Jackson	Jackson	108,168	131,994	143,274	8.5% ▲
13	Muskegon	Muskegon	121,545	129,943	157,426	21.2% ▲
14	St. Clair	Port Huron	91,599	107,201	120,175	12.1% ▲
15	Bay	Bay City	88,461	107,042	117,339	9.6% ▲
16	Monroe	Monroe	75,666	101,120	118,479	17.2% ▲

== Sports ==
=== Baseball ===
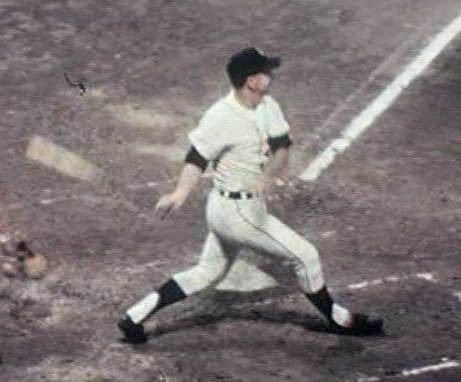
Norm Cash

- 1961 Detroit Tigers season – Under manager Bob Scheffing, the Tigers compiled a 101–61 record (the sixth best win percentage in franchise history) and finished in second place in the American League, eight games behind the New York Yankees. First baseman Norm Cash led the major leagues with a .361 batting average and a .487 on-base percentage. Other Tigers who led the majors in 1961 included outfielder Al Kaline with 41 doubles, second baseman Jake Wood with 14 triples, and pitcher Frank Lary with 22 complete games. The team's other statistical leaders included Rocky Colavito with 45 home runs and 140 RBIs, Frank Lary with 23 wins, and Terry Fox a 1.41 earned run average.
- 1961 Michigan Wolverines baseball team - Under head coach Don Lund, the Wolverines compiled a 20–11 record and won the Big Ten Conference championship. Richard Syring was the team captain. Other notable players included catcher Bill Freehan (.446 batting average in 1961) and pitchers Mike Joyce, Fritz Fisher, and Dennis McGinn (2.14 ERA in 1961).

=== American football ===
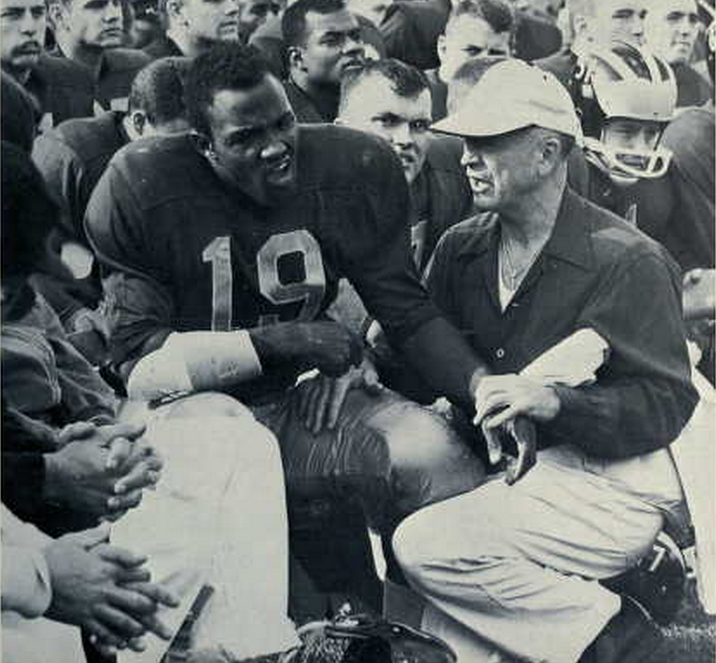
Dave Raimey

- 1961 Detroit Lions season – The Lions, under head coach George Wilson, compiled an 8–5–1 record and finished in second place in the NFL's West Division. The team's statistical leaders included Jim Ninowski with 1,921 passing yards, Nick Pietrosante with 841 rushing yards, Gail Cogdill with 956 receiving yards, and Jim Martin with 70 points scored.
- 1961 Michigan State Spartans football team – Under head coach Duffy Daugherty, the Spartans compiled a 7–2 record and were ranked No. 8 in the final AP Poll. The team's statistical leaders included Pete Smith with 630 passing yards, George Saimes with 451 rushing yards, and Lonnie Sanders with 247 receiving yards.
- 1961 Michigan Wolverines football team – Under head coach Bump Elliott, the Wolverines compiled a 6–3 record. The team's statistical leaders included Dave Glinka with 588 passing yards, Dave Raimey with 496 rushing yards, and Bennie McRae with 210 receiving yards.
- 1961 Detroit Titans football team – Under head coach Jim Miller, the Titans compiled a 5–4 record. The team's statistical leaders included Jerry Gross with 1,126 passing yards and Vic Battani with 358 rushing yards.
- 1961 Western Michigan Broncos football team – Under head coach Merle Schlosser, the Broncos compiled a 4–4–1 record.
- 1961 Central Michigan Chippewas football team – Under head coach Kenneth "Bill" Kelly, the Chippewas compiled a 2–8 record.
- 1961 Wayne State Tartars football team – Under head coach Harold D. Willard, the Tartars compiled a 1–6 record.
- 1961 Eastern Michigan Hurons football team – Under head coach Fred Trosko, the Hurons compiled an 0–8–1 record.

=== Basketball ===
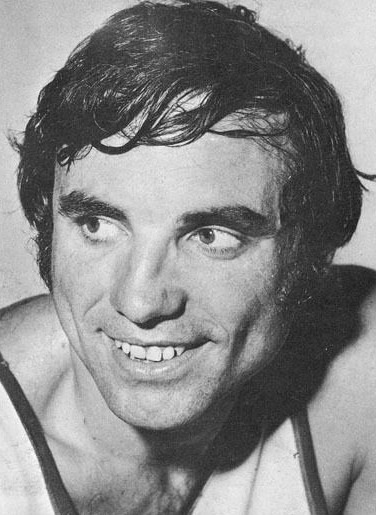
Dave DeBusschere

- 1960–61 Detroit Pistons season – Under head coach Dick McGuire, the Pistons compiled a 34–45 record. The team's statistical leaders included Bailey Howell with 1,815 points and 1,111 rebounds, and Gene Shue with 530 assists.
- 1960–61 Detroit Titans men's basketball team – The Titans compiled an 18–9 record under head coach Bob Calihan. Dave DeBusschere led the team with an average of 22.1 points per game.
- 1960–61 Michigan State Spartans men's basketball team – Under head coach Forddy Anderson, the Spartans compiled a 7–17 record. Dick Hall led the team with an average of 16.3 points per game.
- 1960–61 Michigan Wolverines men's basketball team – Under head coach Dave Strack, the Wolverines compiled a 6–18 record. John Tidwell led the team with an average of 19.2 points per game.
- 1960–61 Western Michigan Broncos men's basketball team – Under head coach Don Boven, the Broncos compiled a 10–14 record.

=== Ice hockey ===
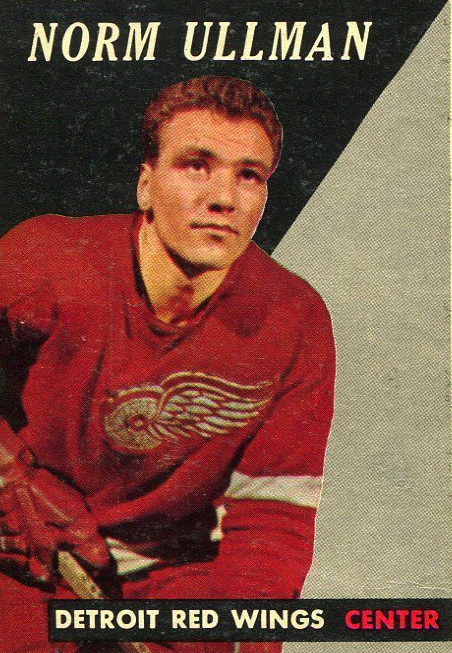
Norm Ullman

- 1960–61 Detroit Red Wings season – Under head coach Sid Abel, the Red Wings compiled a 25–29–16 record and lost to the Chicago Black Hawks in the 1961 Stanley Cup Finals. The team's statistical leaders included Norm Ullman with 28 goals and Gordie Howe with 49 assists, and 72 points. The team's regular goaltenders were Hank Bassen and Terry Sawchuk.
- 1960–61 Michigan Wolverines men's ice hockey season – Under head coach Al Renfrew, the Wolverines compiled a 16–10–2 record.
- 1960–61 Michigan Tech Huskies men's ice hockey team – Under head coach John MacInnes, Michigan Tech compiled a 16–13 record.
- 1960–61 Michigan State Spartans men's ice hockey team – Under head coach Amo Bessone, the Spartans compiled an 11–16 record.

=== Golf ===
- 1961 U.S. Open - Gene Littler won the 61st U.S. Open, played between June 15 and June 17 at Oakland Hills Country Club in Bloomfield Township. The crowds of 20,439 spectators on Saturday and 47,975 overall set U.S. Open records.
- Buick Open - Jackie Burke won the Buick Open, defeating Billy Casper and Johnny Pott in a Monday playoff on July 3 at the Warwick Hills Golf and Country Club in Grand Blanc, Michigan.
- Michigan Open – John Barnum of Grand Rapids successfully defended his Michigan Open championship (his fourth Michigan Open championship), defeating Max Evans in a sudden-death playoff at the Farmington Country Club on August 21.

=== Boat racing ===
- Port Huron to Mackinac Boat Race – The Sixth Girl was the 28th boat to cross the finish line but was declared the winner on July 24 based on its nine-hour handicap. The Dyna, out of Sturgeon Bay, Wisconsin, was the first boat to cross the finish line.
- APBA Gold Cup - Despite failing to win a single heat, Bill Muncey, a Detroit native driving the Miss Century 21 Thriftway Stores, won his third Gold Cup race, the unlimited hydroplane world championship, on Pyramid Lake in Nevada on August 28. Muncey won a total of eight Gold Cup races between 1956 and 1979.
- Silver Cup Race - Bob Hayward, the world power boat champion, was killed when his boat, the Miss Supertest II, crashed in the third heat of the Silver Cup Race on the Detroit River on September 10. Ron Musson won the race in his boat, the Miss Bardahl. The Miss Bardahl went on to win five of six Gold Cup races between 1963 and 1968.

== Music ==
- Runaway by Grand Rapids native Del Shannon was released in February and rose to No. 1 on the Billboard Hot 100.
- I Want a Guy, the debut single from The Supremes with lead vocals by Diana Ross, was released on March 9 on the Tamla label.
- Let Your Conscience Be Your Guide, the debut single from Marvin Gaye, was released on May 25 on the Tamla label.
- Oh Mother of Mine, the debut single from The Temptations, was released on July 24 on the Miracle label. Another single from the group, Check Yourself, was released on November 7 and became a regional hit.
- Please Mr. Postman, the debut single from The Marvelettes, was released in August 1961 on the Tamla label. It became a No. 1 hit on the Billboard Hot 100 and R&B charts. It was the first Motown song to reach No. 1 on the Billboard Hot 100 -- Shop Around had previously reached No. 2.

== Chronology of events ==
=== October ===
- October 8 - Otis M. Smith, the Michigan Auditor General, was appointed to the Michigan Supreme Court by Gov. Swainson. Smith was the first African-American appointed to the state's highest court.

== Births ==
- January 9 - Al Jean, screenwriter and producer (The Simpsons, ALF, It's Garry Shandling's Show), in Farmington Hills, Michigan
- January 11 - Ali Haji-Sheikh, placekicker at Michigan (1980-1982) and in NFL (1983-1987), in Ann Arbor, Michigan
- January 17 - Keith Bostic, safety for Michigan (1979-1982) and in NFL (1983–1990), in Ann Arbor, Michigan
- February 5 - Tim Meadows, actor and comedian and one of the longest-running cast members on Saturday Night Live, in Highland Park, Michigan
- March 9 - Rick Steiner, professional wrestler, in Bay City, Michigan
- April 24 - Roger Mayweather, boxer (held world titles as a super featherweight and as a light welterweight) and trainer (for Floyd Mayweather Jr.), in Grand Rapids, Michigan
- May 7 - Lisa Rainsberger, last American woman to win a Boston Marathon (1985), in Battle Creek, Michigan
- May 20 - Lisa Kron, actress and playwright won the Tony Award for Best Original Score and Best Book of a Musical for Fun Home, in Ann Arbor, Michigan
- June 4 - El DeBarge, singer-songwriter, producer and musician, in Detroit
- July 7 - Dean Hamel, defensive tackle in NFL (1985-1990), in Detroit
- August 18 - Bob Woodruff, television journalist, in Bloomfield Hills, Michigan
- August 29 - Jeff Kellogg, Major League Baseball umpire since 1991 and 5x World Series umpire, in Coldwater, Michigan
- September 28 - Gregory Jbara, Tony Award-winning film, television and stage actor (Billy Elliot the Musical), and singer, in Westland, Michigan
- October 10 - Brian Diemer, track athlete who won bronze medal in 3000m steeplechase at 1984 Olympics, in Grand Rapids, Michigan
- October 24 - Rick Margitza, jazz tenor saxophonist, in Dearborn, Michigan
- October 26 - Matt Crouch, televangelist and filmmaker, in Muskegon, Michigan
- November 29 - Tom Sizemore, actor (Saving Private Ryan, Black Hawk Down), in Detroit
- December 24 - Mary Barra, CEO of General Motors since 2014, in Royal Oak, Michigan

=== Gallery of 1961 births ===
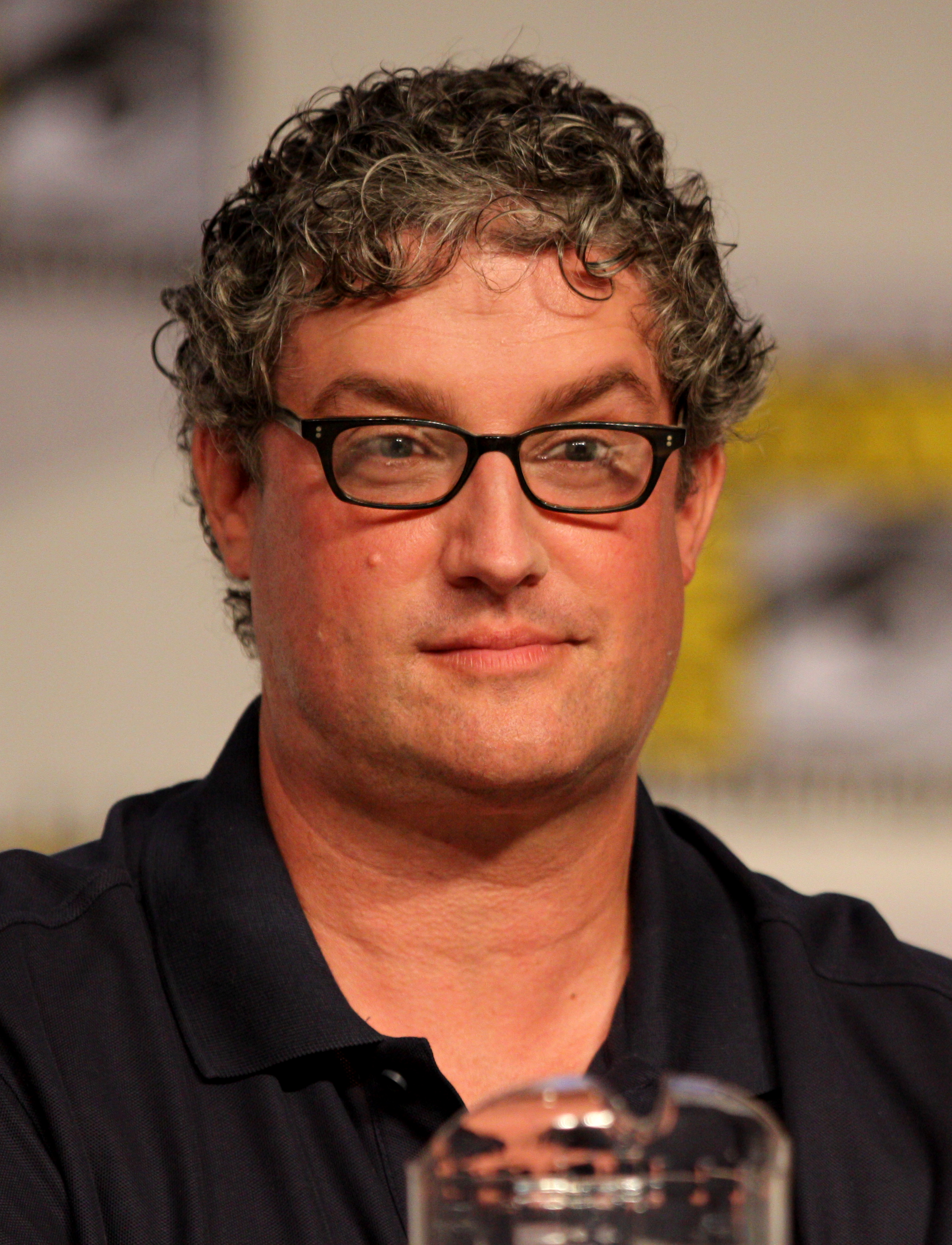
Al Jean

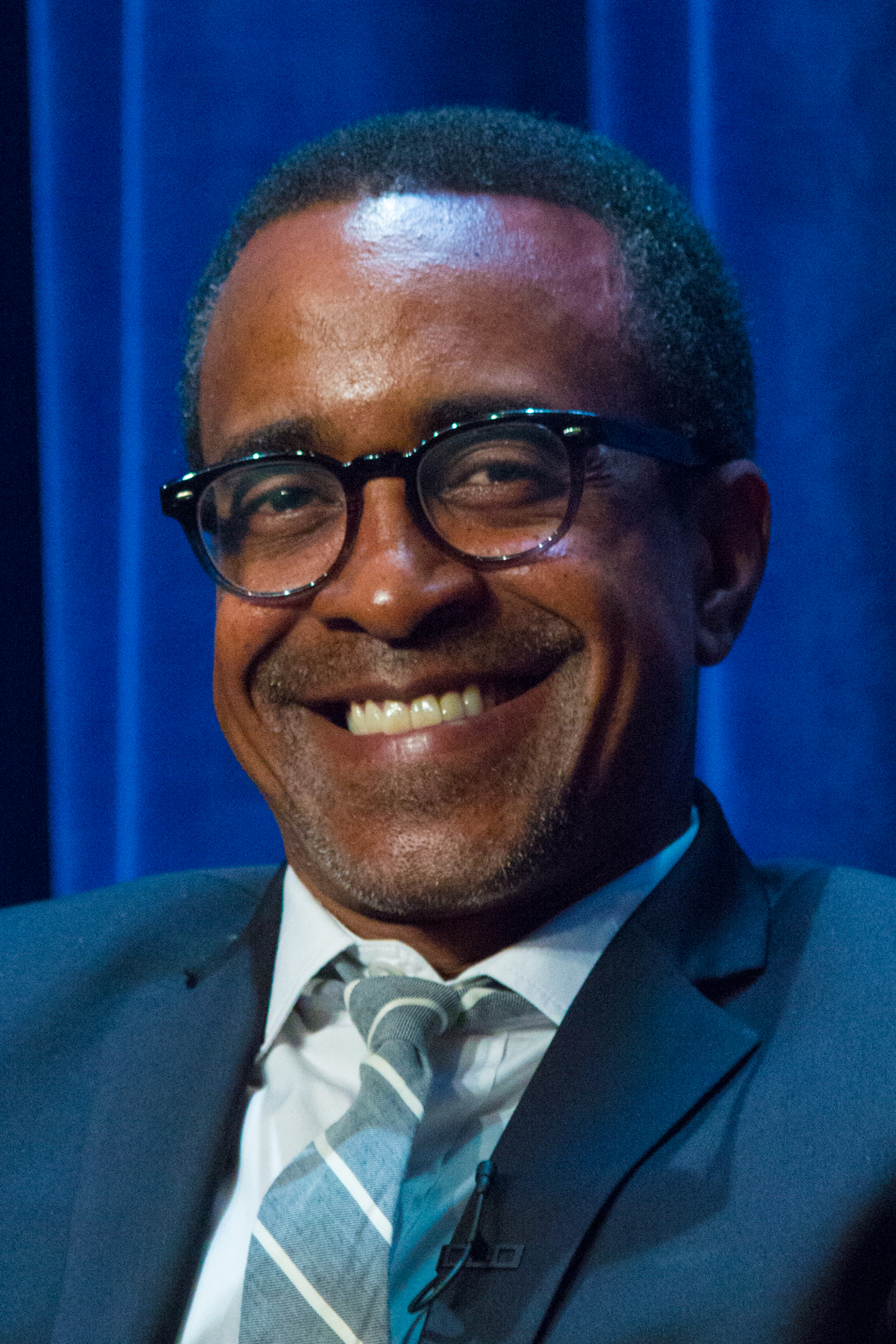
Tim Meadows

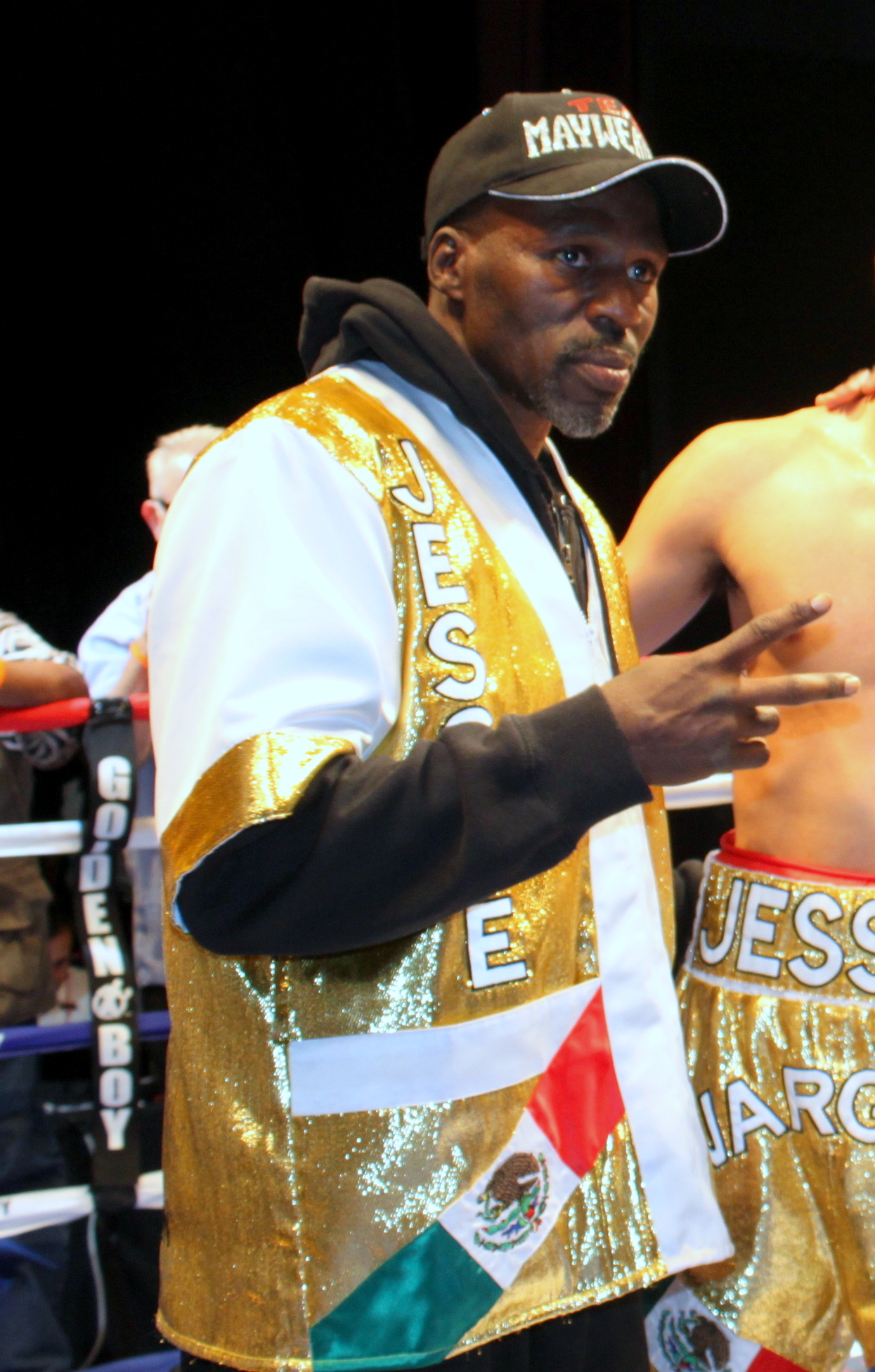
Roger Mayweather

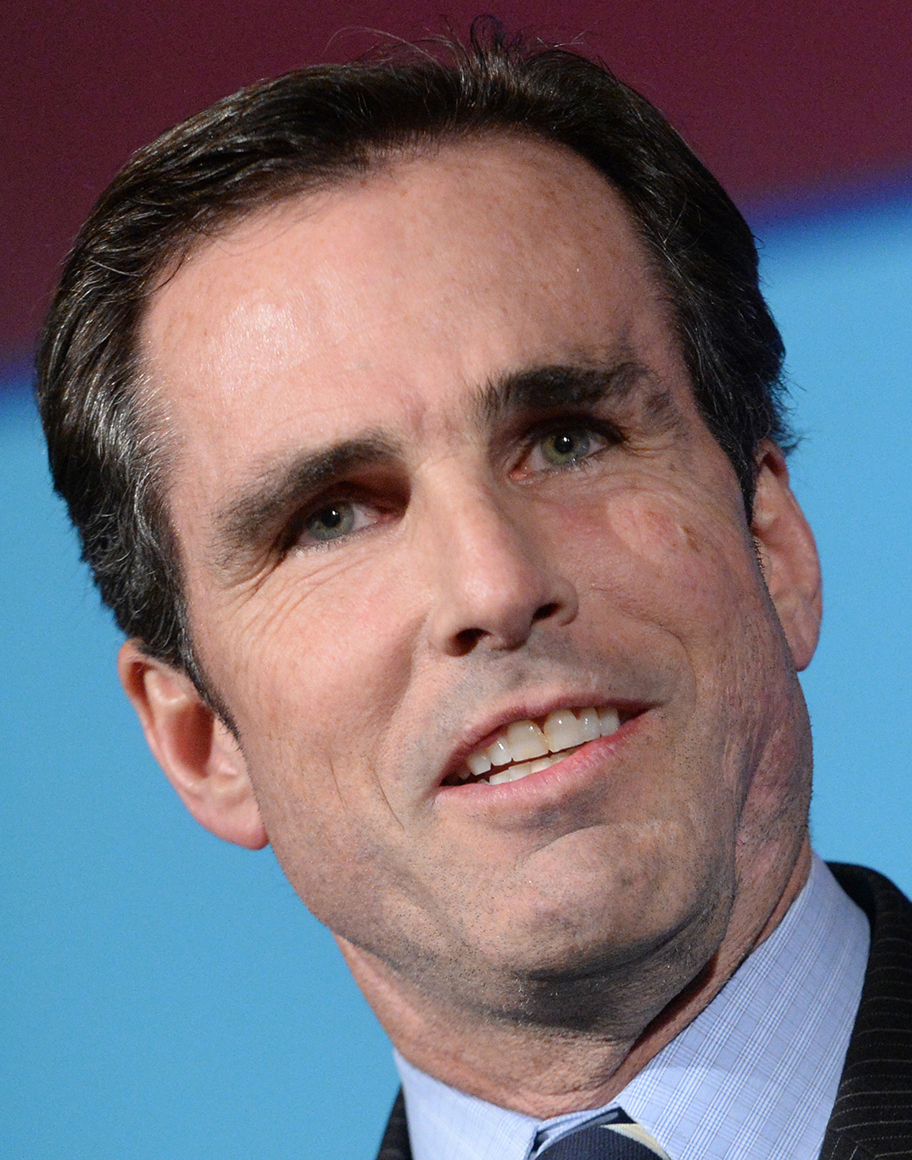
Bob Woodruff

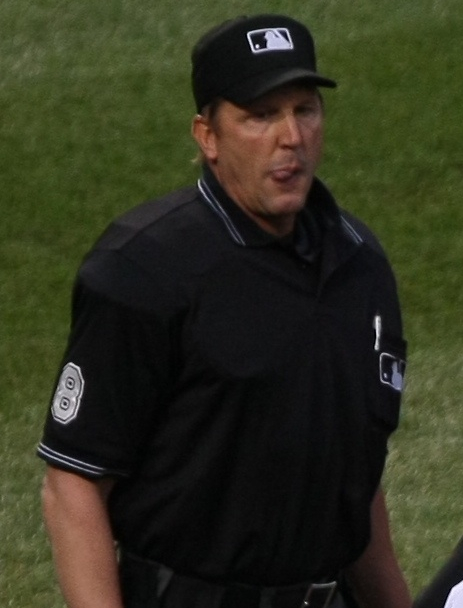
Jeff Kellogg

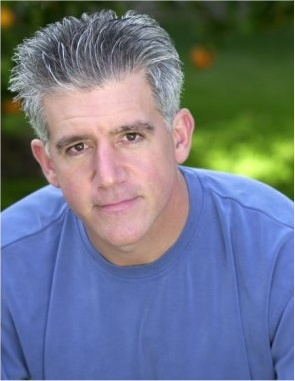
Gregory Jbara

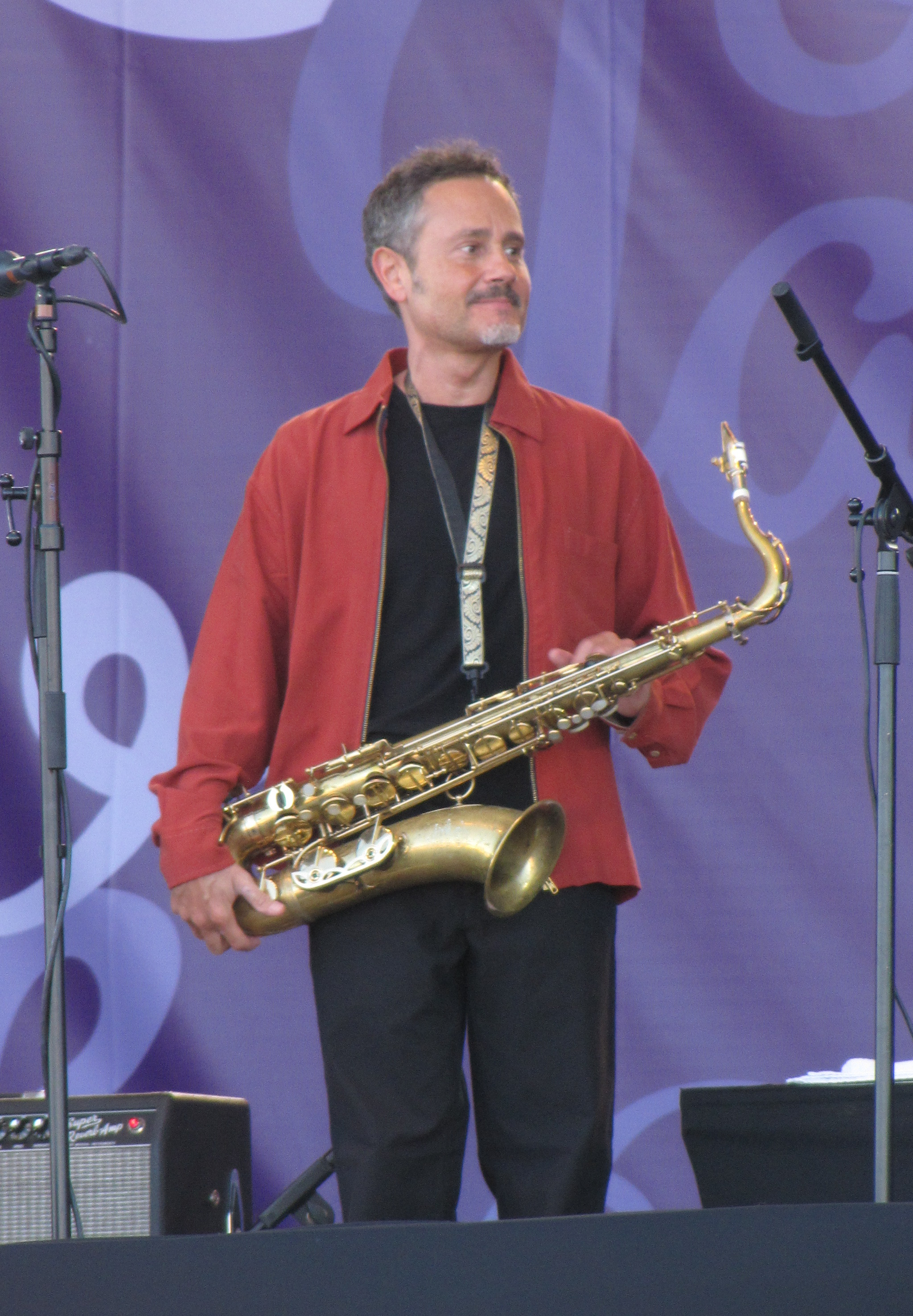
Rick Margitza

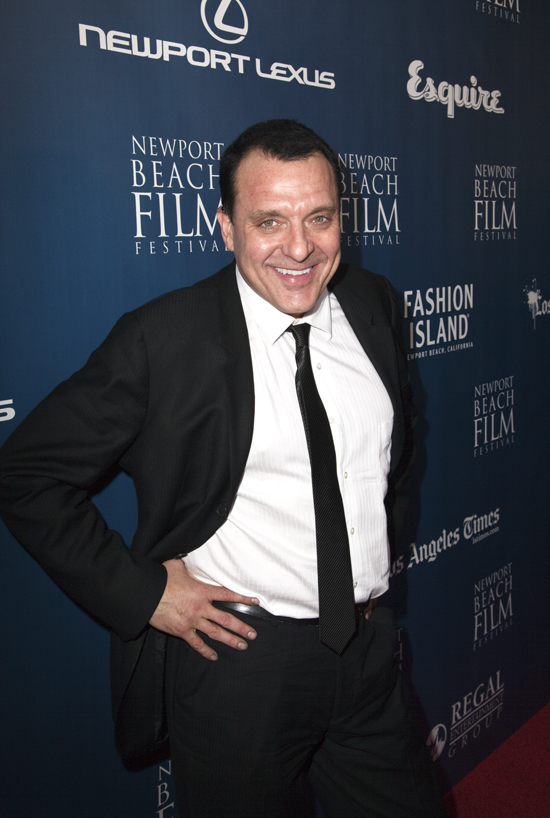
Tom Sizemore

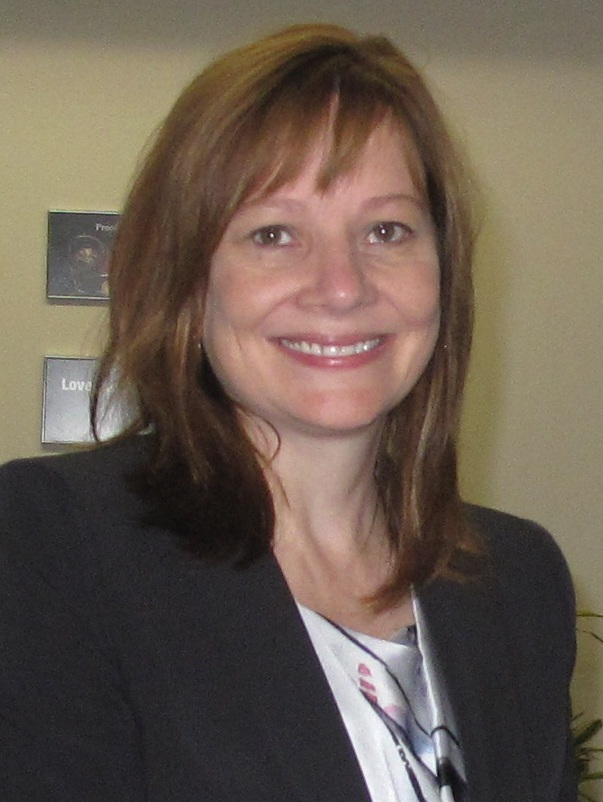
Mary Barra

== Deaths ==
- January 8 - Schoolboy Rowe, pitcher for the Detroit Tigers (1932–1942) and 3× All-Star, at age 50 in El Dorado, Arkansas
- April 15 - Mary Chase Stratton, ceramic artist and co-founder of Pewabic Pottery, at age 94 in Detroit
- July 17 - Ty Cobb, player for the Detroit Tigers (1905–1926) and 12× AL batting champion, at age 74 in Atlanta
- September 1 - Eero Saarinen, architect and industrial designer noted for his neo-futuristic style, at age 51 at the University Medical Center in Ann Arbor, Michigan
- September 26 - C. E. Wilson, President of General Motors (1941-1953), U. S. Secretary of Defense (1953-1957), at age 71 in Norwood, Louisiana
- October 9 - George G. Sadowski, U.S. Congressman (1933-1951), at age 58 in Utica, Michigan
- November 12 - Louis C. Rabaut, U.S. Congressman (1935-1961), at age 74 in Hamtramck, Michigan
- December 27 - Tommy Hughitt, American football player for Michigan (1912-1914) and in pro football (1917-1924), at age 69 in Bartow, Florida

=== Gallery of 1961 deaths ===
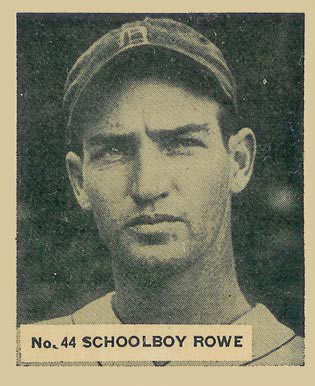
Schoolboy Rowe

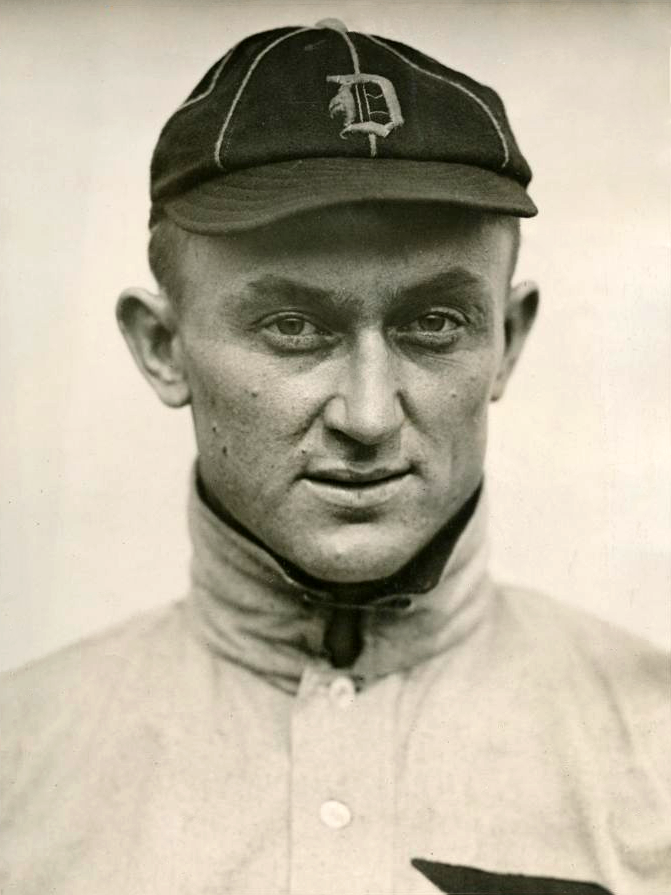
Ty Cobb

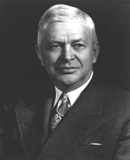
C. E. Wilson

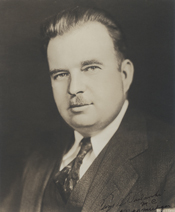
George G. Sadowski

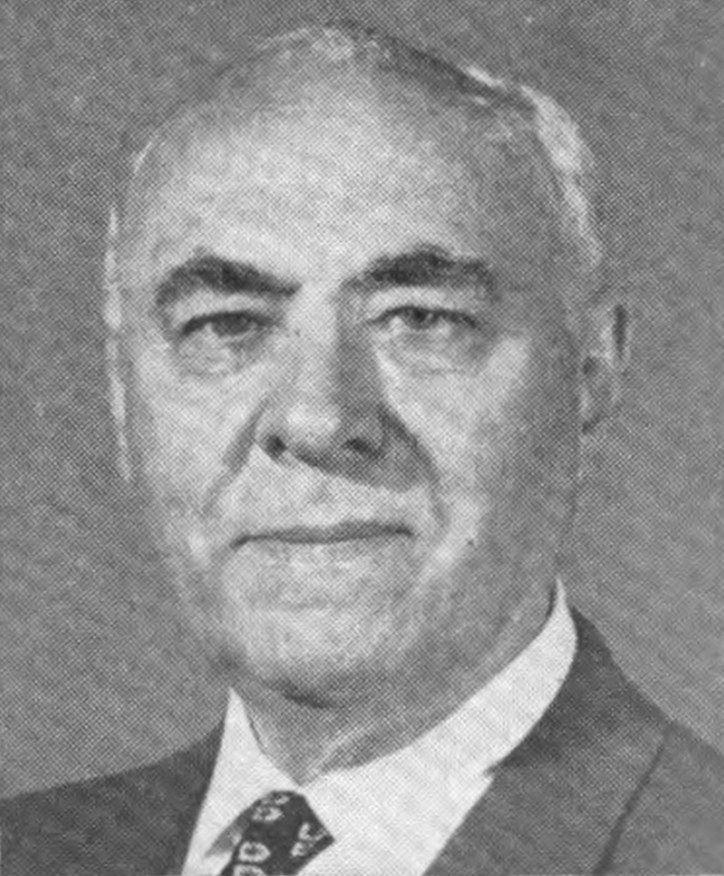
Louis Rabaut

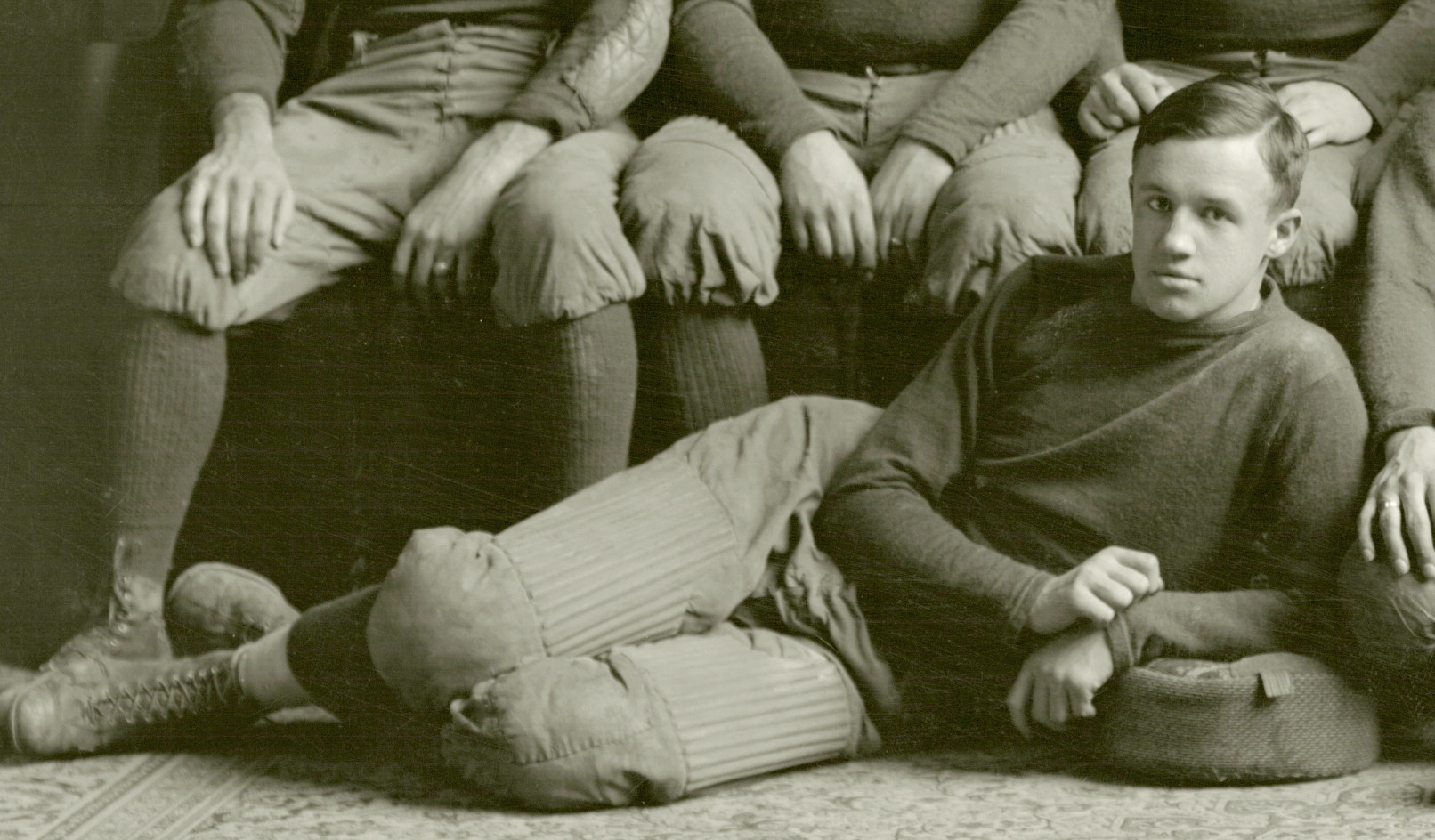
Tommy Hughitt

== See also ==
- History of Michigan
- History of Detroit
