= Bromocresol purple =

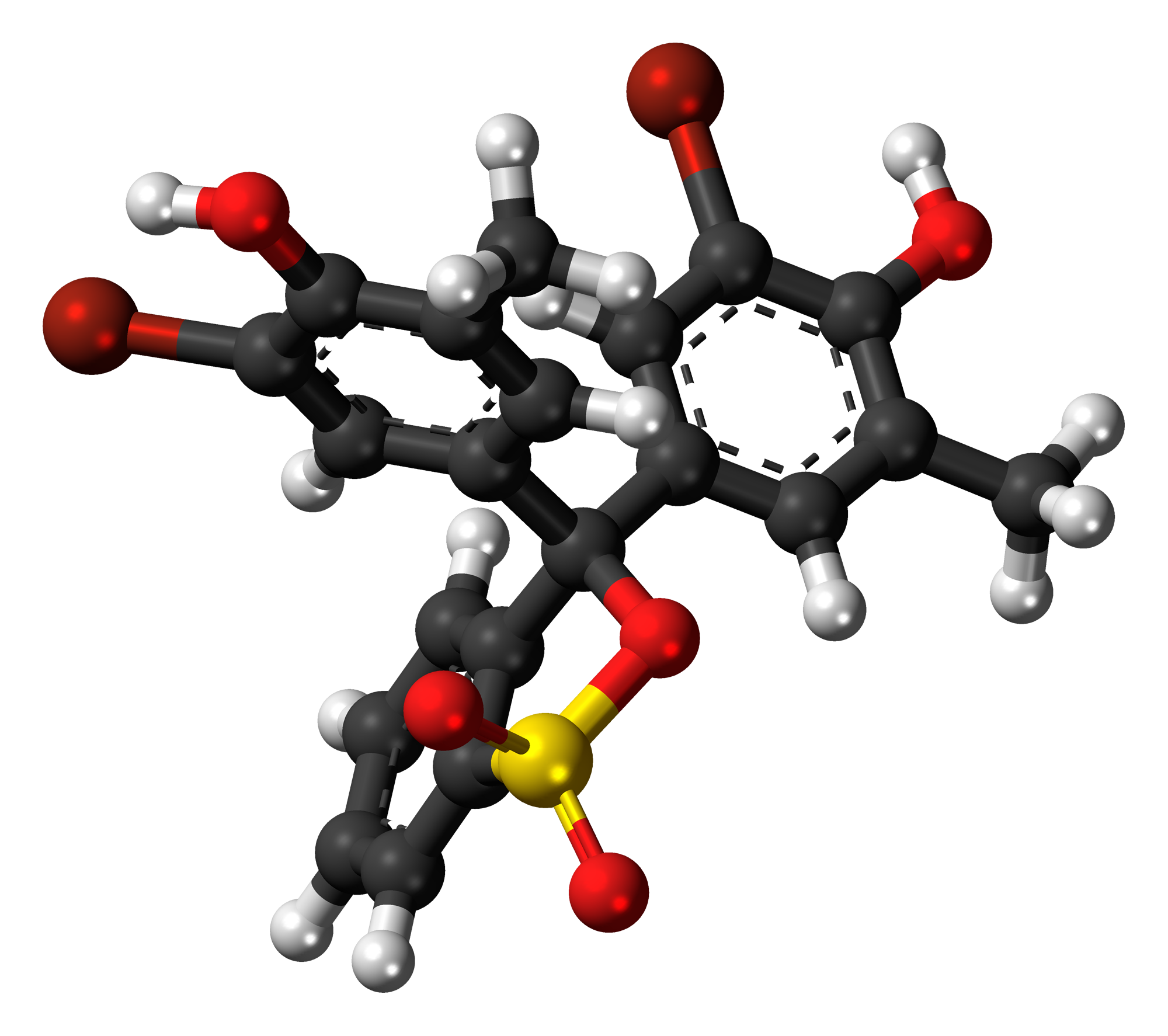

Names
- Preferred IUPAC name 3,3-Bis(3-bromo-4-hydroxy-5-methylphenyl)-2,1λ^{6}-benzoxathiole-1,1(3H)-dione
- Other names 5′,5′′-Dibromo-o-cresolsulfonephthalein; Bromcresol purple

Identifiers
CAS Number	115-40-2
3D model (JSmol)	Interactive image
ChEBI	CHEBI:86154
ChemSpider	7974
ECHA InfoCard	100.003.716
EC Number	204-087-8
PubChem CID	8273
UNII	201C22C3EC
CompTox Dashboard (EPA)	DTXSID3059428
- InChI: InChI=1S/C21H16Br2O5S/c1-11-7-13(9-16(22)19(11)24)21(14-8-12(2)20(25)17(23)10-14)15-5-3-4-6-18(15)29(26,27)28-21/h3-10,24-25H,1-2H3 Key: ABIUHPWEYMSGSR-UHFFFAOYSA-N; InChI=1/C21H16Br2O5S/c1-11-7-13(9-16(22)19(11)24)21(14-8-12(2)20(25)17(23)10-14)15-5-3-4-6-18(15)29(26,27)28-21/h3-10,24-25H,1-2H3 Key: ABIUHPWEYMSGSR-UHFFFAOYAH; InChI=1/C21H17BrO5S/c1-12-9-14(7-8-18(12)23)21(15-10-13(2)20(24)17(22)11-15)16-5-3-4-6-19(16)28(25,26)27-21/h3-11,23-24H,1-2H3
- SMILES: Brc1c(O)c(cc(c1)C3(OS(=O)(=O)c2ccccc23)c4cc(c(O)c(Br)c4)C)C

Properties
Chemical formula	C_{21}H_{16}Br_{2}O_{5}S
Molar mass	540.22 g·mol^{−1}
Appearance	Purple powder
Melting point	241 to 242 °C (466 to 468 °F; 514 to 515 K) (decomposition)
Solubility in water	< 0.1 %

Hazards
- GHS labelling
Pictograms	(GHS07: Exclamation mark)
Signal word	Warning
Hazard statements	H315, H319, H335
Precautionary statements	P261, P264, P271, P280, P302+P352, P304+P340, P305+P351+P338, P312, P321, P332+P313, P337+P313, P362, P403+P233, P405, P501
NFPA 704 (fire diamond)	1 0 0
- Except where otherwise noted, data are given for materials in their standard state (at 25 °C [77 °F], 100 kPa). verify (what is ?) Infobox references

Bromocresol purple (BCP) or 5′,5″-dibromo-o-cresolsulfophthalein, is a dye of the triphenylmethane family (triarylmethane dyes) and a pH indicator. It is colored yellow below pH 5.2, and violet above pH 6.8. In its cyclic sulfonate ester form, it has a pK_{a} value of 6.3, and is usually prepared as a 0.04% aqueous solution.

== Uses ==
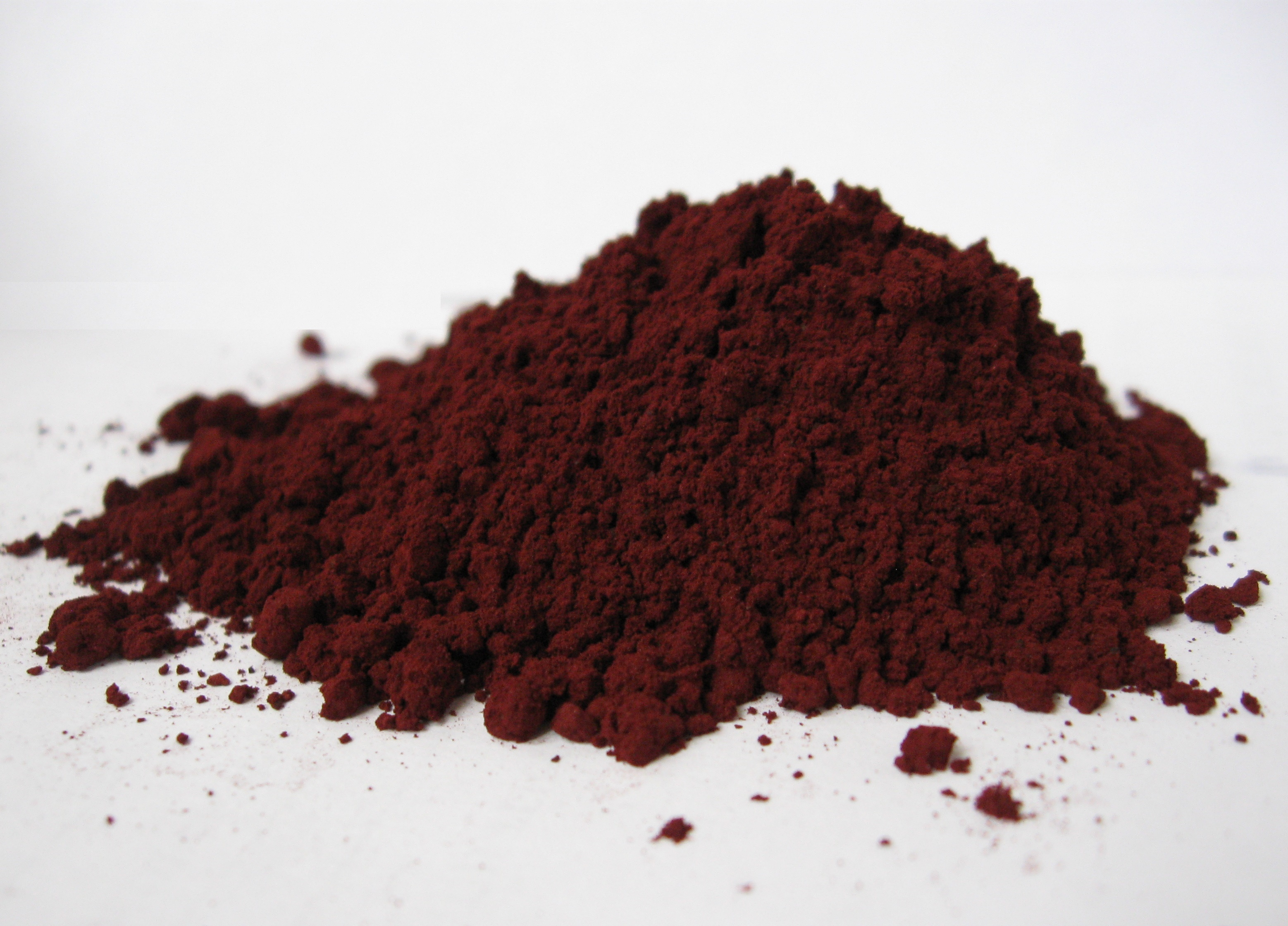
A sample of bromocresol purple in its violet form

Bromocresol purple (pH indicator)
below pH 5.2		above pH 6.8
(yellow) 5.2	⇌	6.8 (violet)

Bromocresol purple is used in medical laboratories to measure albumin. Use of BCP in this application may provide some advantage over older methods using bromocresol green. In microbiology, it is used for staining dead cells based on their acidity, and for the isolation and assaying of lactic acid bacteria.

In photographic processing, it can be used as an additive to acid stop baths to indicate that the bath has reached neutral pH and needs to be replaced.

Bromocresol purple milk solids glucose agar is used as a medium used to distinguish dermatophytes from bacteria and other organisms in cases of ringworm fungus (T. verrucosum) infestation in cattle and other animals.

=== pH Indicator ===
Similar to bromocresol green, the structure of bromocresol purple changes with pH. Changing the level of acidity causes a shift in the equilibrium between two different structures that have different colors. In near-neutral or alkaline solution, the chemical has a sulfonate structure that gives the solution a purple color. As the pH decreases, it converts to a sultone (cyclic sulfonic ester) that colors the solution yellow. In some microbiology tests, this change is used as an indicator of bacterial growth.

== See also ==
- Metacresol purple
