= Max D. Liston =

American chemist and inventor (born 1918)

- Born: Max Davis Liston; March 16, 1918; Oswego, Kansas, U.S.
- Education: University of Minnesota (BA); Chrysler Institute of Engineering; (MS)
- Known for: Infrared spectrophotometry; Capnometry
- Scientific career
- Fields: Engineering
- Workplaces: Perkin-Elmer, General Motors, Liston-Becker

Max Davis Liston (born March 16, 1918) is an American pioneer in the development of instruments for infrared spectrophotometry and non-dispersive infrared analysis. Two of his innovations, the breaker-type direct-coupled amplifier and the vacuum thermocouple, were essential to the development of infrared spectrometry technology. Among others, Liston has developed instruments for capnometry, the measurement of carbon dioxide in respiratory gases, used to monitor patients. He also developed instruments to measure smog and car exhaust emissions, essential to attempts to improve Los Angeles air quality in the 1950s.

== Early life and education ==
Max Davis Liston was born on March 16, 1918, in Oswego, Kansas, United States to Virdon (or Verdon) Milne Liston and Madge Ruth Davis. He had an older sister, Lorene. His father was a superintendent of schools. Liston attended high school in Fort Scott, Kansas. Because the science options there were limited, he took summer classes in physics at Northwestern University.

Liston received a B.A. in electrical engineering with a minor in communications (electronics) from the University of Minnesota in 1940. In his junior year he wrote a paper on "Modulation of incandescent lamps", winning an IEEE prize. In his senior year he wrote a "Study of the negative transconductance of pentodes". He was the first undergraduate to be admitted into the University of Minnesota Sigma Psi chapter.

Hired by the Chrysler Corporation, he worked at Chrysler from 1940 to 1942, receiving his M.S. in mechanical engineering in 1941 through an innovative work-study program, the Chrysler Institute of Engineering. He developed a bonded strain gauge pressure sensor, modifying a previous Pullman Company design, and presented the work to the American Automotive Society.

== War-time work ==
In 1942 Liston joined General Motors. A number of projects at GM were related to World War II, and involved researchers in other companies, universities and government. Initially Liston worked with a group led by Charles F. Kettering at GM to develop a sensor to detect submarines and with Harrison M. Randall of the University of Michigan on the improvement of infrared spectroscopy equipment for analysis of high-octane Triptane aviation fuel.

In 1943, Liston developed the breaker-type direct-coupled amplifier. This allowed a signal to be sent directly from a thermocouple to a recording device. It was initially classified as top-secret because of its use in military applications. These included submarine detection instruments, heat-tracking sensors for experimental glide bombs, oximeters for high-altitude aviation, and instruments to measure thermal radiation released in atomic bomb tests for the Manhattan Project. Liston published a paper on the d.c. amplifier in 1954.

Through his war work, Liston met James Elam and George Saxton. He also met August Herman Pfund of Johns Hopkins University, who had patented both early positive and negative IR-analyzers. While visiting the Naval Research Laboratories, Liston was able to identify positive type infrared analyzers which had been brought back from Germany at the end of the war.

When GM and Dupont decided to build their own spectrophotometers, Liston and David Frye from GM apprenticed with Harrison Randall at the University of Michigan to learn more about spectrophotometry. They then helped Dr. Downing at Dupont Experimental Station to build a spectrophotometer for use in petrochemical classification and plastics research.

To further improve GM's spectrophotometer, Liston worked with Charles Morris Reeder to develop a vacuum thermocouple that eliminated the problem of thermal drift in spectroscopy measurements. The breaker-type direct-coupled amplifier and the vacuum thermocouple became essential contributions to the development of infrared spectrometry technology.

== Perkin Elmer ==
In 1946, Richard Scott Perkin recruited Liston to join Perkin-Elmer as a chief engineer. Liston, John U. White, Van Zandt Williams and Vincent J. Coates formed the double-beam spectrophotometer research group. Liston's breaker amplifier and the Reeder thermocouple were incorporated into designs for the Perkin-Elmer Model 12 single-beam and Model 21 double-beam spectrophotometers, which became extremely successful.

== Liston-Becker ==
In 1950, Morris Folb and Max Liston formed the Liston-Folb company, focusing on the development of nondispersive infrared analyzers. In 1951, they received backing from Albert Austin and Richard S. Becker, who created the Liston-Becker Instrument Company to handle instrument sales. The Liston-Becker plant was located in Springdale, Connecticut. They developed and sold the Model 16 capnograph and Mark II and Mark III atmospheric analyzers for the US Navy's submarines.

=== Capnometry ===
Liston's initial development work on the capnograph occurred before the formation of Liston-Folb. Capnometry is the measurement of the concentration of carbon dioxide (CO_{2}) in the respiratory gases, an important monitoring tool for patients undergoing anesthesia and in intensive care. Liston-Becker was one of a number of companies seeking to develop instruments to measure CO_{2} using infrared absorption.

Soon after leaving Perkin-Elmer, Liston was approached by Drs. James Elam and George Saxton, who he had met doing war work, to build a CO_{2} analyzer to test their theories about causes of cardiac arrest in anesthesia patients. In 1951, Liston provided Elam with a prototype nondispersive infrared analyzer, which Elam used in his human respiratory physiology research at Barnes Hospital and Washington University in St. Louis. After relocating to Roswell Park Comprehensive Cancer Center (then known as the Roswell Park Memorial Institute) in Buffalo, New York in 1953, Elam used a newer Liston-Becker model analyzer in his research. With Liston's apparatus, Elam was able to make important contributions to the study of respiratory physiology, and substantial improvements to anesthesia machines. The color indicators on the instruments were not working properly, allowing patients to inhale high levels of dangerous CO_{2} undetected, and a valve in the apparatus tended to stick and cause rebreathing. Once identified, both problems were fixed. Liston also provided prototypes to Dr. Philip Drinker of Harvard Medical School, to Dr. John Wendell Severinghaus of Johns Hopkins University, and to Dr. J. L. Whittenberger. Liston's first sale was to Dr. Julius H. Comroe, Jr. at the University of Pennsylvania.

Initially the medical spectrophotometer had a mask-style attachment, into which the patient breathed. This was later modified to use a nasal catheter because many polio patients could not use the mouth-breathing apparatus. Eventually the Polio Foundation began to use Liston's Model 16 CO_{2} analyzer to monitor Iron Lung machines, cutting in half both the time that patients spent in the machines and the death rate of Iron Lung machine users.

Liston developed an industrial analyzer in response to a request from Dupont. The industrial analyzer performed similar types of analysis, but was built in an explosive-proof case to meet industrial safety requirements. The Model 15 had a cheap metal case and could be used for non-explosive laboratory work.

=== Atmospheric analysis ===
Beckman Instruments Mark V Atomic Submarine Atmosphere Analyzer, 1965

By 1958, Liston-Becker had also delivered several atmospheric-analyzer models for the US Navy's submarines, some of which were tested on the USSN Nautilus, the first atomic-powered submarine. The Navy was interested in monitoring the air quality on submarines during long submersion, particularly the presence of carbon monoxide, carbon dioxide, hydrogen, oxygen and Freon. Liston-Becker redesigned a Pauling Oxygen meter from Beckman Instruments for the oxygen detection. The final atmospheric analyzer had to pass Navy tests for measuring air quality, withstanding shock, and tilt sensitivity. Liston-Becker's first atmosphere analyzers were the Mark II, built in 1953, and the Mark III, built in 1954. Fourteen Mark III analyzers were sold to the Navy, for $75,000 each. After the Beckman Instruments company took over Liston-Becker, Beckman continued the development of the Mark IV and Mark V.

== Beckman Instruments ==
In 1955, Liston's backers, Albert Austin and Richard S. Becker, agreed to sell their company to Beckman Instruments. Max Liston joined Beckman Instruments, Inc. in 1955 and remained with the company until 1965, initially as manager of Liston-Becker. After the Connecticut-based Liston-Becker plant was closed in a reorganization in 1958, Liston became Beckman Instruments Director of Engineering in California.

=== Smog analysis ===
Arnold Beckman lived in Altadena, California and had a strong interest in solving the smog issue. One of Liston's most significant projects at Beckman Instruments involved automobile-emissions analyzers for smog tests in L.A.

In 1952, Arie Jan Haagen-Smit presented results that suggested that car exhausts were a major contributor to the development of California smog. In 1956 the city of Los Angeles conducted emissions tests to determine whether cars were to blame for the smog of Los Angeles. Determining the effects of automobiles required the development of a mobile instrument capable of measuring smog and automobile emissions. The Liston-Becker Model 28 could be put in the back of a car and powered by batteries in the trunk. The city tested 1000 cars, owned by local businesses, at the Los Angeles riverbed. Seven Liston analyzers were used in the tests. The emissions tests revealed that many of the test cars had poorly maintained V8 engines. The engines' cylinders fired poorly and in some cases raw fuel escaped. The experimenters also discovered that the smog in L.A. caused varnish to form in the automobiles’ carburetors, changing the fuel-to-air ratio. The Model 28 and Model 30 emissions analyzers were sold to major U.S. auto manufacturers such as Chrysler and General Motors and used for the inspection and servicing of automobiles. Liston also worked with Haagen-Smit on equipment for monitoring SO_{2} from power stacks and refineries.

While at Beckman Instruments, Liston helped to develop the Mark IV submarine analyzer. He also developed the first pulse oximeter, but Beckman Instruments was not interested in marketing it. Liston retired from the company in 1965, not long after Arnold Beckman stepped down as president of the company.

== Liston Scientific ==
After leaving Beckman Instruments, Liston continued to work on a variety of projects with various partners, eventually forming Liston Scientific, of which he became president.

One project was to improve the design of medical respirators, which were of interest to Forrest Bird, Dr. Albert Starr and Miles "Lowell" Edwards of Edwards Lifesciences. Liston believed he could create a ventilator with an integrated circuit to detect when the patient was able to breathe on his own, automatically switching between a preset ventilation rate and a patient-dependent one as needed. He was able to develop such an instrument for Edwards.

Another project, involving Miles Edwards, Jr. was the development of an Instrument Positive Pressure Breathalyzer (IPPB) for treating asthma patients. Liston's design was known as the Handi-Vent IPPB. It was later licensed to Ohio Medical Products.

SmithKline approached Liston to improve the design of its spectrophotometer. They needed a machine that could meet tight specifications, for analyzing reagents in temperature-dependent rate reactions. Liston's design and 35 prototypes made by Edward Murphy were accepted by SmithKline. Liston Scientific completed its part of the project in 1966, helping to set up the Corbin-Farnsworth factory for production. Liston's design was manufactured by SmithKline as the Alpha spectrophotometer, part of a system called the Escalab.

In 1966 and 1967, Liston developed a Digital-Alpha circuit to calculate the logarithmic decay of a capacitor-resistor. The circuit was patented by Liston Scientific in 1967. It was used in bichromatic analyzers which Liston designed for Abbott Laboratories, beginning with the ABA-100. The ABA-100 was a single-reagent double-channel kinetic analyzer for ultra-micro chemical analysis and simultaneous bichromatic spectrophotometry. One module of the instrument performed the chemical processing, dispensing the reagent and sample for the reaction and performing the spectrophotometry measurements. A second module monitored and controlled the processing module and calculated and reported results. Later models incorporated specialty microprocessors instead of memory chips.

Liston was interested in developing a multi-channel unit which could handle multiple tests at once, and which would incorporate a sample-identification system to prevent identification errors. When Abbott was not interested in it, Liston went on to develop the Paramax clinical analyzer for Baxter International.

Liston developed instruments that used selective binding of fluorescent tags and subsequent photodetection for the examination of chemical compounds. One instrument was designed to test blood samples for steroids and other drugs. Liston also developed specialty test instruments for electrolyte testing, Hemoccult testing, glucose testing and blood urea nitrogen (BUN) analysis. He is an innovator in the area of chemical-luminescence instrumentation, particularly measurement of oxides of nitrogen.

In addition, Liston and Lowell Edwards formed the Liston-Edwards company to work on the measurement of hydrocarbons. They developed an emissions analyzer that detected photo-reactive gases, ignoring non-reactive gases.
