= Chrysler Institute of Engineering =

Private university in Highland Park, Michigan, US

Coordinates: 42.4001°N 83.0819°W

- Type: Private graduate school
- Active: 1931–1988
- Parent institution: Chrysler Corporation
- Location: Highland Park, Michigan, United States
- Campus: Urban

The Chrysler Institute of Engineering was an engineering graduate school operated by the Chrysler Corporation from 1931 to 1988. Situated on the company's headquarters complex in the Detroit enclave of Highland Park, Michigan, the school offered master's degrees in mechanical engineering, as well as non-degree training programs for its employees.

== Origins ==
The Chrysler Institute of Engineering was founded to address a shortage of suitable automotive engineers. While the company was successful at recruiting existing engineers, teaching them the "Chrysler way" of doing things was time consuming and expensive. Engineer Carl Breer broached the subject of founding an engineering school to Walter Chrysler, who tasked Vice President K. T. Keller with finding the man to build the school. The first director of the Institute was John J. Caton, formerly the head of the automative engineering department at the University of Detroit. Caton formulated the school's curriculum by studying similar schools established by companies such as General Electric and Westinghouse, and the Institute secured a charter from the Michigan Department of State allowing it grant degrees.

== Operation ==
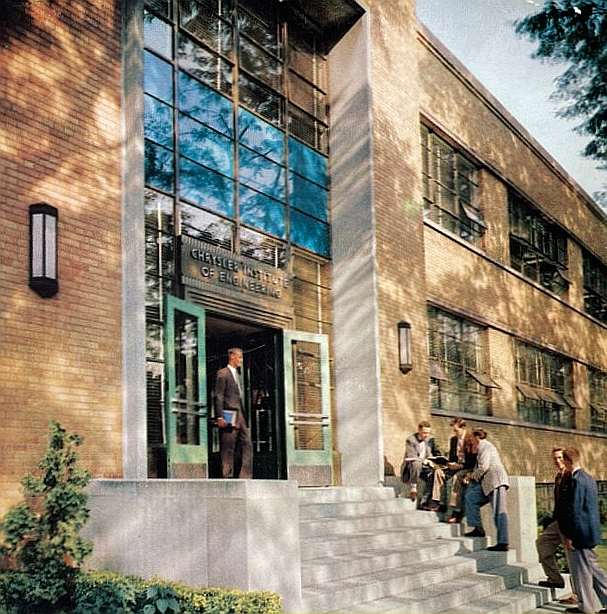
The Engineering Building in the early 1950s

Starting in 1931, the Institute enrolled postgraduate students, both recent college graduates and those with work experience, in a two year program that awarded master's degrees in mechanical engineering. Each student would draw a full time engineer's salary and divide his time between classroom instruction and hands-on experience working in various departments of Chrysler. In 1933, its first class graduated 35 students, awarding 14 master's degrees and 21 diplomas.

The Institute quickly added free evening classes, taught by the graduate students, to offer advanced training to engineering employees. While this program granted a diploma, not a degree, it proved popular, with over 1,000 students enrolled by 1934. In 1940, the Institute allowed messenger boys from the drafting department to study drafting, and women and disabled veterans were extended the opportunity in 1942. In the school's first decade, classes were held in various buildings of the Chrysler complex, but a new Chrysler Institute of Engineering Building was opened at 12260 Oakland Avenue in October 1942, which featured classrooms, laboratories, drafting rooms, and an auditorium. In its first two decades of operation, the Chrysler Institute of Engineering had awarded 545 master's degrees, and the overwhelming majority of students stayed with Chrysler, forming significant percentage of its executives.

In August 1986, Chrysler announced that it would move 5,000 engineering employees from its headquarters in Highland Park to a new technical center in suburban Oakland County. The Chrysler Institute closed in 1988, and by 1996 Chrysler had moved all of its operations to its new headquarters in Auburn Hills.

== Notable alumni ==
- John DeLorean
- Reuben Kelto
- Max D. Liston
- William C. Newberg
- Virginia Sink
- Vaino Jack Vehko

== See also ==
- Kettering University
