= Vaino Jack Vehko =

American aerospace engineer

Vaino Jack Vehko (5 May 1918 – 17 August 1999) was an engineer for the Chrysler Corporation.

Vehko was born in Detroit, Michigan, was the son of James Vehko (aka Jalmari Vehkomäki) of Kolho, Finland. He spent his entire career with Chrysler Corporation developing aircraft engines, guided missiles and booster rockets. In 1952 he joined Chrysler Missile Division as head of engineering for the Redstone and then the Jupiter missile systems. In 1960 he became Director of Engineering on the Saturn S-I and S-IB booster rocket program at Chrysler Space Division's Michoud operation in New Orleans, Louisiana.

The Saturn I was the United States' first heavy lift launch vehicle. It had ten successful flights, including four Apollo boilerplate flights and three Pegasus micrometeoroid satellites. The Saturn IB boosters successfully launched four uncrewed and five crewed Apollo missions. They were the forerunners of the Saturn V that launched the NASA Apollo Moon missions. Vehko retired as General Manager of the Chrysler Space Division in 1976.

He received a B.S. in Mechanical Engineering from the University of Michigan, Ann Arbor in 1940, and a M.S. degree in Automotive Engineering from Chrysler Institute of Engineering, Highland Park, Michigan in 1942. After World War II he worked with recently arrived German rocket designers led by Wernher von Braun in Huntsville, Alabama.

He married Hilda Scherer (1921–2008) in 1941, with whom he had four children. He died in Austin, Texas.

== Publications ==
- Vehko, Vaino J (January 1966). A "zero stage" for the Saturn IB launch vehicle. Society of Automotive Engineers. ASIN B0007HPIXU.
- Vehko, Vaino J (1966). A supersonic / hypersonic aerodynamic investigation of the Saturn IB / Apollo upper stage. NASA contractor report.
