= Isosbestic point =

Invariant spectroscopic point used in chemical kinetics

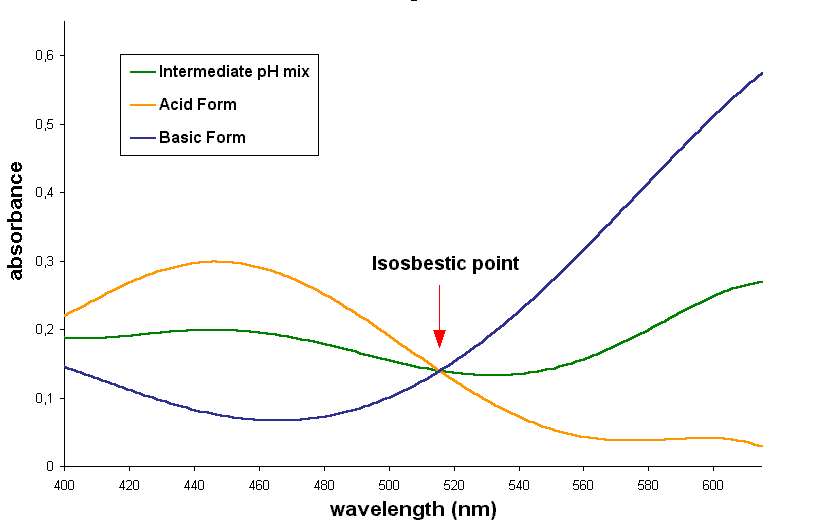
Isosbestic point in the bromocresol green spectrum. The spectra of basic, acid and intermediate pH solutions are shown. The analytical concentration of the dye is the same in all solutions.

In spectroscopy, an isosbestic point is a specific wavelength, wavenumber or frequency at which the total absorbance of a sample does not change during a chemical reaction or a physical change of the sample. The word is derived from two Greek words: "iso", meaning "equal", and "sbestos", meaning "extinguishable".

== Interpretation ==
An isosbestic point corresponds to an absorbance $A_\lambda$ at a fixed wavelength $\lambda$ that remains fixed. The absorbance can be written as sum of absorbances of each species (Beer–Lambert law)
$$A_\lambda  = \ell \sum_{i=1}^n \epsilon_i(\lambda) c_i \,,$$
where $c_i$ the concentration of species i, $\ell$ the optical path length. By definition, an isosbestic point can be interpreted as a fixed linear combination of species concentrations,
$$L = \sum_{i}^n b_i c_i, \ \ \ \frac{d L}{dt} = 0  \,,$$
i.e. an isobestic point is a conservation law.

The IUPAC gold book provides as an example the reaction
$$A + B \rightarrow c C + d D + e E \,,$$
which will lead to an isosbestic point if
$$\epsilon_A(\lambda) + \epsilon_B(\lambda) = c \ \epsilon_C(\lambda) + d \ \epsilon_D(\lambda) + e \ \epsilon_E(\lambda)  \,,$$

Isosbestic points can be observed in a variety of techniques (for instance UV-VIS, IR, NMR). In UV-VIS, an isosbestic point is often interpreted as implying the occurrence of a single linearly independent reaction.

The simplest examples of isosbestic points involve only two species, but isosbestic points do not imply the participation of only two species (e.g. the IUPAC example involves 5 species), which is a common misconception.

== Isosbestic plot ==
When an isosbestic plot is constructed by the superposition of the absorption spectra of two species (whether by using molar absorptivity for the representation, or by using absorbance and keeping the same molar concentration for both species), the isosbestic point corresponds to a wavelength at which these spectra cross each other.

A pair of substances can have several isosbestic points in their spectra.

When a 1-to-1 (one mole of reactant gives one mole of product) chemical reaction (including equilibria) involves a pair of substances with an isosbestic point, the absorbance of the reaction mixture at this wavelength remains invariant, regardless of the extent of reaction (or the position of the chemical equilibrium). This occurs because the two substances absorb light of that specific wavelength to the same extent, and the analytical concentration remains constant.

For the reaction:

$$X \rightarrow Y$$

the analytical concentration is the same at any point in the reaction:

$$c_X  + c_Y = c \,$$.

The absorbance of the reaction mixture (assuming it depends only on X and Y) is:

$$A = l\cdot (\epsilon_{X} c_{X} +  \epsilon_{Y} c_{Y} )$$.

But at the isosbestic point, both molar absorptivities are the same:

$$\epsilon_X  = \epsilon_Y = \epsilon \,$$.

Hence, the absorbance

$$A = l\cdot (\epsilon_{X} c_{X} +  \epsilon_{Y} c_{Y} )=l\cdot\epsilon \cdot (c_{X} + c_{Y} )=l\cdot\epsilon\cdot c$$

does not depend on the extent of reaction (i.e., on the particular concentrations of X and Y)

The requirement for an isosbestic point to occur in this example is that the two species involved are related linearly by stoichiometry, such that the absorbance is invariant at a certain wavelength. It can now also readily be seen that one should not expect an isosbestic point for two successive reactions:

$$X \rightarrow Y \rightarrow Z$$

As we then would need there to be a wavelength $\lambda^*$ at which all three spectra intersect simultaneously:

$$\epsilon_X (\lambda^*) = \epsilon_Y (\lambda^*) =  \epsilon_Z (\lambda^*) \,$$.

It would be very unlikely for three compounds to have extinction coefficients that are linearly related in this way by chance.

== Applications ==
The haemoglobin / oxyhaemoglobin system, measured through pulse oximetry, shows an isosbestic point near 808 nm

Following the photochemical cycloisomerization of a Cd complex of an A/D-seco-corrin to the corresponding metal-free corrin ligand by UV/VIS spectroscopy

In chemical kinetics, isosbestic points are used as reference points in the study of reaction rates, as the absorbance at those wavelengths remains constant throughout the whole reaction.

Isosbestic points are used in medicine in a laboratory technique called oximetry to determine hemoglobin concentration, regardless of its saturation. Oxyhaemoglobin and deoxyhaemoglobin have (not exclusively) isosbestic points at 586 nm and near 808 nm.

Isosbestic points are also used in clinical chemistry, as a quality assurance method, to verify the accuracy in the wavelength of a spectrophotometer. This is done by measuring the spectra of a standard solution at two different pH conditions (above and below the pK_{a} of the substance). The standards used include potassium dichromate (isosbestic points at 339 and 445 nm), bromothymol blue (325 and 498 nm) and congo red (541 nm). The wavelength of the isosbestic point determined does not depend on the concentration of the substance used, and so it becomes a very reliable reference.

One example of the use of isosbestic points in organic synthesis is seen in the photochemical A/D-corrin cycloisomerization ring closure reaction, which was the key step in the Eschenmoser / ETH Zürich vitamin B_{12} total synthesis. The isosbestic points provide proof for a direct conversion of the seco-corrin complex to the metal-free corrin ligand without intermediary or side products (within the detection limits of UV/VIS spectroscopy).
