= Colorimetric capnography =

Technique for detecting carbon dioxide in exhaled gas

Colorimetric capnography is a qualitative measurement method that detects the presence of carbon dioxide (CO_{2}, a relatively acidic gas) in a given gaseous environment. From a medical perspective, the method is usually applied by exposing litmus paper/film to an environment containing a patient's airway gases (i.e. placing it into their breathing circuit/airway circuit), where it will then change color depending on the amount of exhaled CO_{2} within the circuit. Although there are multiple uses, the colorimetric capnography method is most frequently used to quickly confirm that an advanced airway device such as an endotracheal tube (ETT) or nasotracheal tube (NTT) has been placed in the desired location. Correct placement is evidenced by sufficient color change of the litmus paper while exposed to the airway gases which, if the device is properly placed, will contain relatively high amounts of exhaled CO_{2}. Conversely, lack of detection of CO_{2} suggests many possible issues, including improper placement of the advanced airway device, most commonly into the esophagus. There are no contraindications to capnography.

== Equipment ==
Colorimetric capnography devices do not require electricity, change color reversibly (breath-by-breath), and add a small amount of dead space. A variety of devices are available from multiple manufacturers. Specific devices on the market include the Covidien Nellcor EasyCap or PediCap (manufactured by Medtronic), and the StatCO_{2}, Mini StatCO_{2}, and Neo-StatCO_{2} (made by Mercury Medical).

Metacresol purple is an example of a pH-dependent dye commonly used in such devices. The colour change of the EasyCap is from purple to yellow/gold, leading to the phrase 'good as gold' or 'gold is good', as an aide-mémoire for successful tracheal intubation.

== Medical applications ==
=== Airway device placement ===
Colorimetric capnography is most frequently used in medical contexts to determine whether exhaled CO_{2} is present in a patient's airway circuit after placement of an advanced airway device (e.g. ETT or NTT), but the meaningful significance of CO_{2} detection is in reality much more broad. Detection of sufficient CO_{2} suggests that a patient is metabolically active and capable of eliminating CO_{2}, while lack of color change or insufficient color change suggests an issue at one or more of many possible levels including issues with cellular metabolism, airway device integrity and placement, circuit integrity, mucous plugging, cardiopulmonary function, device malfunction, and more.

=== Nasogastric tube placement ===
Inadvertent placement of a nasogastric tube (NGT) into the airway rather than the stomach can lead to complications such as pneumothorax and pneumonia. The use of colorimetric capnography to detect proper placement of a nasogastric tube (NGT) has shown promise, especially in mechanically ventilated patients. With this method, rather than exposing the litmus paper to the patient's airway gases via connection with the airway circuit, the litmus paper is exposed to the gases transmitted via the nasogastric tube. Put simply, just as this method can detect the desired presence of significant CO_{2} in an airway, it can also detect the desired lack of CO_{2} in a properly placed nasogastric tube. Further research on this particular use of colorimetric capnography and the widespread incorporation of adapters will likely be required if this utilization is to become more commonplace.

=== Patient monitoring ===
Data inputs from multiple sources (e.g. blood pressure cuff (sphygmomanometer), pulse oximeter, thermometer, etc.) are used to characterize a patient's vital condition, and the more meaningful data that is available, the more accurate and precise a clinician can be in addressing a patient's health status. Capnography as a whole represents a significantly useful data point in monitoring a patient's respiratory and metabolic status in situations including but not limited to cardiac arrest, metabolic acidemia, mechanical ventilation, and procedural sedation.

== Comparison to quantitative capnography ==
One disadvantage of qualitative capnography methods such as colorimetry is that they do not produce a direct numeric or waveform readout as can a quantitative method such as infrared capnography. The colorimetric method rather presents CO_{2} simply as a color most commonly on the spectrum of purple (lower CO_{2}) to gold (higher CO_{2}) and leaves the clinician to interpret anything beyond this single returned value. Despite being a more rudimentary method of capnography as compared to quantitative methods such as infrared capnography, colorimetric capnography has proven to remain beneficial in multiple contexts in modern medicine as mentioned in the above section. Evidence also suggests that colorimetric capnography is just as effective as infrared capnography at determining correct tracheal airway device placement, but may fall short of infrared capnography when detecting inadvertent esophageal airway device placement.

== Naming controversy ==
There has been debate related to the term 'colorimetric capnography,' especially with the growing employment of this method during the COVID-19 pandemic due to an increased volume of patients requiring mechanical ventilation. The use of the term 'capnography' technically implies some type of quantitative result or readout which, as described above, is not produced by the colorimetric method. Descriptors such as "carbon dioxide colorimetry," "colorimetric carbon dioxide detection," and "chemical colorimetric analysis" have been suggested as potentially more accurate replacements.

== See also ==
- Capnography
- Metacresol purple
- Colorimetric analysis
- Colorimetry (chemical method)
