= Virginia Sink =

American automotive engineer (1913–1986)

Mary Virginia Sink
- Born: September 14, 1913; Denver, Colorado, U.S.
- Died: November 20, 1986 (aged 73); Pontiac, Michigan, U.S.
- Education: University of Colorado (BS); Chrysler Institute of Engineering (MA)
- Occupation: Engineer
- Employer: Chrysler

Virginia Sink (September 14, 1913 – November 20, 1986) was an American chemical engineer and the first woman automotive engineer at Chrysler.

== Early life and education ==
Mary Virginia Sink was born in Denver, September 14, 1913, to Iva and George Sink, who worked in printing. She attended North High School in Denver and was part of the Girls' Athletics Society.

She graduated as a chemical engineer from the University of Colorado in 1936.

She had originally intended becoming a teacher but lacked the finance necessary to complete the training. She later explained the need to tell the engineering department that although she wanted to study chemical engineering she didn't plan on being an engineer. She was admitted to the course and finished in the top three of her class. She went to work for Chrysler where she took a master's degree in engineering in the Chrysler Institute of Engineering. When she graduated in 1938 she was the first woman to do so. Sink then taught at the institute as well as working as an engineer for Chrysler until 1946.

== Career ==
In 1943 Sink was named Supervisor of Laboratory Personnel and was responsible for hiring 500 women during the Second World War. By 1950 she was appointed Group Leader in the Chemical Research Department. Sink gained her chartered member status in the Society of Women Engineers, in the Detroit Section in 1952. Sink worked on the LA smog project from 1957 until 1962 when she co-developed Chrysler's Cleaner Air Package. Sink retired as the Manager of Emission Certification in the Materials Engineering department in 1979.

Sink was a member of the American Chemical Society, the Society of Automotive Engineers, and the National Association of Corrosion Engineers. She was also president of the Soroptomist Federation of America.

== Recognition ==
She was given a number of honours including being the first woman given honorary membership of Tau Beta Pi, the engineering honorary society. In 1950 she was Detroit's Woman of Achievement. Sink was the focus of Charm Magazine in 1956 when they called her a "Symbol of Detroit's Working Women". In 1980, the University of Colorado awarded her the George Norlin Award from in recognition of outstanding achievements. Virginia Sink died in on 20 November 1986 in Pontiac, Michigan.
