= Metacresol purple =

Identifiers
CAS Number	2303-01-7; HCl salt: 67763-22-8
3D model (JSmol)	Interactive image
ChemSpider	2006272
DrugBank	DB05091
ECHA InfoCard	100.017.237
EC Number	218-960-6
PubChem CID	73030
UNII	85ODZ58K3D
CompTox Dashboard (EPA)	DTXSID3062316
- InChI: InChI=1S/C21H18O5S/c1-13-11-15(22)7-9-17(13)21(18-10-8-16(23)12-14(18)2)19-5-3-4-6-20(19)27(24,25)26-21/h3-12,22-23H,1-2H3 Key: OLQIKGSZDTXODA-UHFFFAOYSA-N
- SMILES: CC1=C(C=CC(=C1)O)C2(C3=CC=CC=C3S(=O)(=O)O2)C4=C(C=C(C=C4)O)C

Properties
Chemical formula	C_{21}H_{18}O_{5}S
Molar mass	382.43 g·mol^{−1}
- Except where otherwise noted, data are given for materials in their standard state (at 25 °C [77 °F], 100 kPa). Infobox references

Metacresol purple or m-cresol purple, also called m-cresolsulfonphthalein, is a triarylmethane dye and a pH indicator. It is used as a capnographic indicator for detecting detect end-tidal carbon dioxide to ensure successful tracheal intubation in an emergency. It can be used to measure the pH in subzero temperatures of saline or hypersaline media.

In colorimetric capnography, the indicator is incorporated in an aqueous matrix that provides a pH just above the indicator's colour change. When exposed to carbon dioxide (CO_{2}), it undergoes a colour change from purple to yellow, because when CO_{2} dissolves in the matrix, it forms carbonic acid.

In chemistry, it has two useful indicator ranges:

- pH 1.2–2.8: red to yellow
- pH 7.4–9.0: yellow to purple

== See also ==
- Bromocresol purple
