= Bromocresol green =

Chemical dye and pH indicator

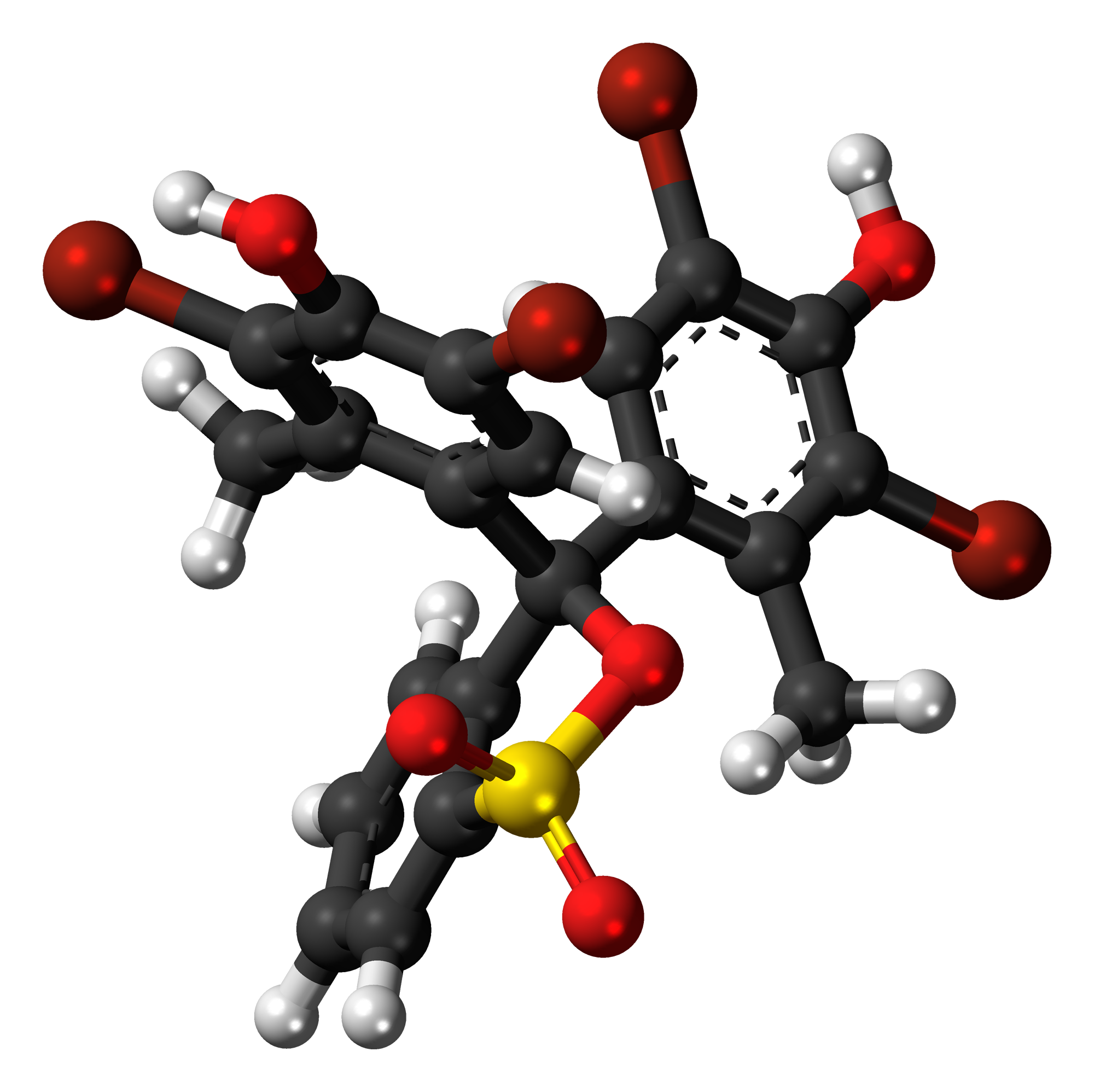

Names
- Preferred IUPAC name 3,3-Bis(3,5-dibromo-4-hydroxy-2-methylphenyl)-2,1λ^{6}-benzoxathiole-1,1(3H)-dione
- Other names 3,3′,5,5′-Tetrabromo-m-cresolsulfonphthalein; Bromcresol green

Identifiers
CAS Number	76-60-8
3D model (JSmol)	Interactive image
Abbreviations	BCG
ChEMBL	ChEMBL145704
ChemSpider	6209
ECHA InfoCard	100.000.885
EC Number	200-972-8
IUPHAR/BPS	4530
PubChem CID	6451
UNII	8YGN0Y942M
CompTox Dashboard (EPA)	DTXSID9044459
- InChI: InChI=1S/C21H14Br4O5S/c1-9-12(7-14(22)19(26)17(9)24)21(13-8-15(23)20(27)18(25)10(13)2)11-5-3-4-6-16(11)31(28,29)30-21/h3-8,26-27H,1-2H3 Key: FRPHFZCDPYBUAU-UHFFFAOYSA-N; InChI=1/C21H14Br4O5S/c1-9-12(7-14(22)19(26)17(9)24)21(13-8-15(23)20(27)18(25)10(13)2)11-5-3-4-6-16(11)31(28,29)30-21/h3-8,26-27H,1-2H3 Key: FRPHFZCDPYBUAU-UHFFFAOYAS
- SMILES: Brc1cc(c(c(Br)c1O)C)C3(OS(=O)(=O)c2ccccc23)c4cc(Br)c(O)c(Br)c4C

Properties
Chemical formula	C_{21}H_{14}Br_{4}O_{5}S
Molar mass	698.01 g·mol^{−1}
Appearance	Beige to brown powder
Odor	Odorless
Melting point	225 °C (437 °F; 498 K) decomposes
Solubility in water	Sparingly soluble
Solubility in other solvents	Soluble in benzene; very soluble in ethanol and diethyl ether
Acidity (pK_{a})	4.90
UV-vis (λ_{max})	423 nm

Hazards
- GHS labelling
Pictograms	(GHS07: Exclamation mark)
Signal word	Warning
Hazard statements	H315, H319, H335
NFPA 704 (fire diamond)	2 1
- Except where otherwise noted, data are given for materials in their standard state (at 25 °C [77 °F], 100 kPa). verify (what is ?) Infobox references

Bromocresol green (pH indicator)
below pH 3.8		above pH 5.4
(yellow) 3.8	⇌	5.4 (blue)

Bromocresol green (BCG) is a dye of the triphenylmethane family (triarylmethane dyes). It belongs to a class of dyes called sulfonephthaleins. It is used as a pH indicator in applications such as growth media for microorganisms and titrations. In clinical practice, it is commonly used as a diagnostic technique. The most common use of bromocresol green is to measure serum albumin concentration within mammalian blood samples in possible cases of kidney failure and liver disease. In chemistry, bromocresol green is used in Thin-layer chromatography staining solutions to visualize acidic compounds.

== Properties ==
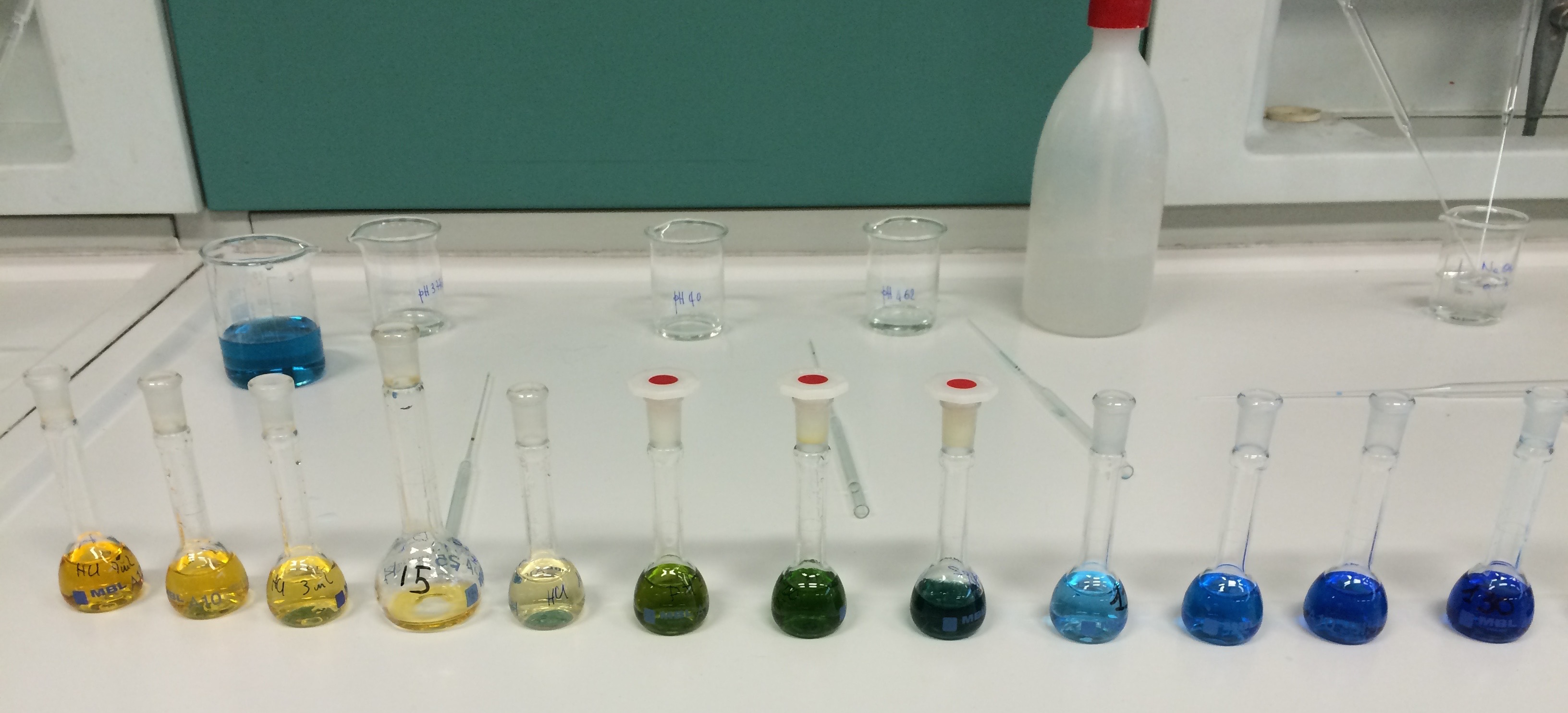
From left to right solutions of 0.1 M HCl, 3 buffer solutions of pH 3.78, 3 of pH 4.00, 3 of pH 4.62 and NaOH 0.1 M after adding different amounts of bromocresol green (more in darker solutions)

In aqueous solution, bromocresol green will ionize to give the monoanionic form (yellow), that further deprotonates at higher pH to give the dianionic form (blue), which is stabilized by resonance:

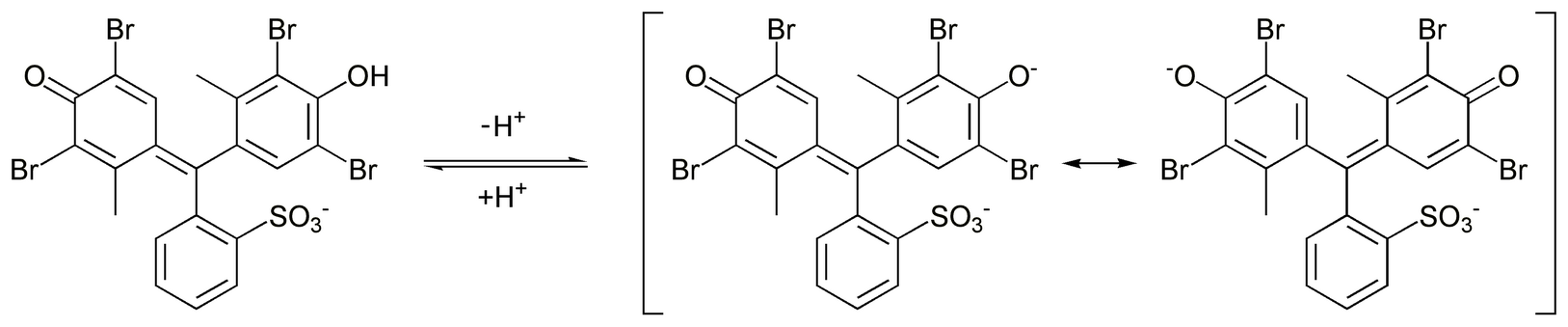

The acid dissociation constant (pK_{a}) of this reaction is 4.8. Tap water is sufficiently basic to give a solution of bromocresol green its characteristic blue-green color.

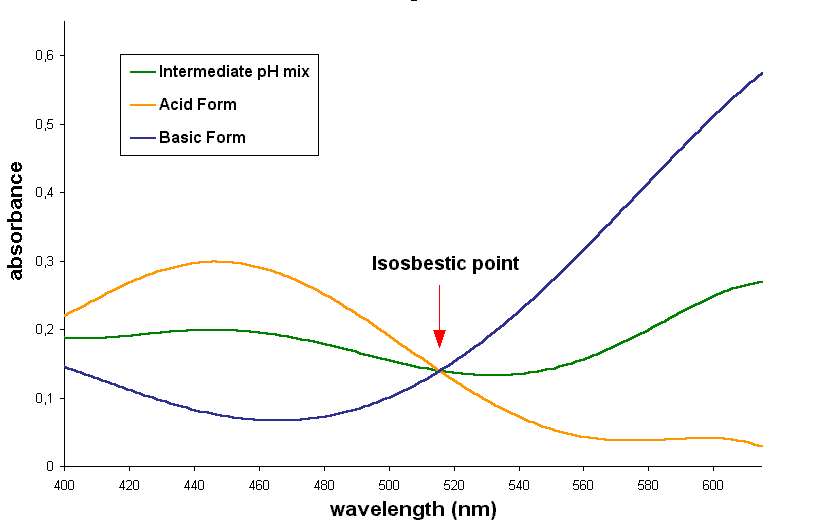
Absorbance spectrum of bromocresol green at different pH values. The isosbestic point occurs where the acid and basic forms and mixtures thereof have the same absorbance

The acid and basic forms of this dye have an isosbestic point in their UV-Visible spectrum around 515 nm, indicating that the two forms interconvert directly without forming any other substance.

An ethanol solution (0.04 wt%) of bromocresol green has been proposed for TLC staining and is suitable for visualisation of the compounds with functional groups whose pK_{a} is below 5.0 (carboxylic acids, sulfonic acids, etc.). These appear as yellow spots on a light or dark blue background; no heating is necessary. Bromophenol blue solution can be used for the same purpose.

The compound is synthesized by bromination of cresol purple (m-cresolsulfonphthalein).

== Uses ==
It is used as a pH indicator and as a tracking dye for DNA agarose gel electrophoresis. It can be used in its free acid form (light brown solid), or as a sodium salt (dark green solid). It is also an inhibitor of the prostaglandin E_{2} transport protein. Additional applications include use in sol-gel matrices, the detection of ammonia, and the measurement of albumin in human plasma and serum.

== Safety ==
Bromocresol green may cause irritation. Skin and eye contact should be avoided.
