= K. T. Keller =

- Born: Kaufman Thuma Keller; November 27, 1885; Mount Joy, Pennsylvania, U.S.
- Died: January 21, 1966 (aged 80); London, England
- Occupations: President Chrysler (1935–1950); Chair of the Board, Chrysler (1950–1956)
- Years active: 1911–1956
- Known for: Creation of Detroit Arsenal
- Spouse: Adelaide
- Children: 2
- Awards: Medal for Merit; Air Force Exceptional Service Award

Kaufman Thuma Keller (27 November 1885 – 21 January 1966), was an American corporate executive who served as the president of Chrysler Corporation from 1935 to 1950 and as its chairman of the board from 1950 to 1956. He is also known for proposing the creation of the Detroit Arsenal.

== Biography ==
=== Automotive career ===
Keller joined the General Motors Company (GMC) in 1911, and he worked as a general master mechanic for one of GMC's divisions, the Buick Motor Company from 1916 to 1919. He quickly rose to become a vice president of Chevrolet in 1921, later becoming a vice president for Chrysler.

From 1935 to 1950 he served as Chrysler's president and then as its chairman of the board until 1956. Under his leadership, Chrysler became second among the world's largest auto producers, with sales exceeding $1 billion in 1947. Further, Chrysler pioneered many of the "engineering advances that are standard today, including high-compression engines and four-wheel hydraulic brakes." Under his leadership Chrysler got a contract from the US government for isolating Uranium 235, and he was a key figure in proposing a nickel plated device for this process that would allow replacement of much of the nickel with less expensive steel.

=== Public service ===
Following World War II, President Harry S. Truman appointed Keller as chairman of the President's Advisory Committee on the Merchant Marine in 1947. Truman also appointed Keller to serve as the director of the Office of Guided Missiles. In 1954, he was one of ten outstanding scientists and industrialists appointed to the newly formed Army Scientific Advisory Panel.

Keller was also a 33rd degree Freemason.

=== Awards ===
Keller received many awards and honors during his lifetime. In 1946, President Truman awarded him the Medal for Merit for his contribution during World War II. In 1954, he received the Air Force Exceptional Service Award. The biggest honor he received occurred in October 1939, when Time honored Keller by not only writing a feature article about his work with Chrysler, but portraying him on the cover of its magazine.

== Footnotes ==
Business positions
Preceded by Walter Chrysler	President of the Chrysler Corporation; July 22, 1935–November 3, 1950	Succeeded by Lester Lum Colbert
Preceded by Walter Chrysler	Chairman of the Chrysler Corporation; November 3, 1950–April 17, 1956	Succeeded by Lester Lum Colbert
