= Lester Lum Colbert =

American businessman (1905–1995)

- Born: Lester Lum Colbert; May 13, 1905; Oakwood, Texas, U.S.
- Died: September 15, 1995 (aged 90); Naples, Florida, U.S.
- Other name: Tex
- Education: University of Texas; Harvard Law School
- Occupation: Former Chrysler chairman and president
- Years active: 1929–1965
- Spouses: Daisy Gorman (m. 1928; died 1970); Robert Ellen Corbin Hoke (m. 1972)
- Children: 3

Lester Lum "Tex" Colbert (June 13, 1905 – September 15, 1995) was an American automobile executive who was president, chairman, and chief executive of the Chrysler Corporation.

== Early life ==
Colbert was born to Sallye (Driver) and Lum Hebert Colbert on June 13, 1905, in Oakwood, Texas. While in high school, Colbert worked as a cotton buyer. He graduated from the University of Texas in 1925 and Harvard Law School in 1929. On November 23, 1928, Colbert married his childhood sweetheart, Daisy Gorman. They had three children.

== Career ==
After graduating from Harvard, Colbert clerked for the New York City firm of Rathbone, Perry, Kelley, and Drye, which was the general counsel for the Chrysler Corporation. When Chrysler decided to hire an in-house counsel in 1933, Colbert was chosen for the job. He was mentored by Chrysler head K. T. Keller, who had Colbert learn about mechanics, engineering, and production, as well as handle labor negotiations and other legal duties. In 1935, Colbert was named vice president of the Dodge division. In 1943, he was put in charge of the new Dodge Chicago Plant and oversaw the construction of most of the B-29 bomber aircraft engines used in World War II. On December 27, 1945, he was promoted to president of Dodge. In 1949 he was made a vice president and director of the Chrysler Corporation.

On November 3, 1950, it was announced that Keller was elected chairman of the board of directors and Colbert would succeed him as the company's president and chief executive. Colbert led the company during prosperous times fueled by the post–World War II economic boom. In August 1955, the company reported all-time records for six months with sales of $1.8 billion, earnings of $70 million, and unit sales of 900,546 cars and trucks (surpassing the prior six-month record of 804,884 cars and trucks). However, by 1958, sales had dropped sharply, with only 165,059 vehicles being sold during the first quarter, and the company posted a loss.

On April 28, 1960, Colbert was elected chairman of the board and was succeeded as president by William C. Newberg. Colbert retained his position as the company's chief executive. Not long after Newberg took office, Colbert instructed the company's general counsel and independent auditors to look into Newberg's interests in vendor companies. On June 30, 1960, Newberg unexpectedly resigned after two months on the job. On July 21, the board of directors announced that it had reached a settlement agreement with Newberg over $450,000 in profits he had made from his stake in two parts suppliers. A second company executive, Jack W. Minor, was forced to resign from his position as director of marketing for the Plymouth–DeSoto–Valiant division after it was found he received $20,000 in sales commissions on Chrysler contracts from two transportation advertising companies he held ownership in. On January 27, 1961, Colbert disclosed that his wife had owned 444 shares in a Chrysler supplier. On July 27, 1961, Colbert announced he was resigning as chairman and president "for the good of the corporation". He was succeeded as chairman by George H. Love and as president by Lynn A. Townsend. Colbert remained with the company as chairman of Chrysler Canada until his retirement on June 30, 1965.

== Later life ==
Colbert's wife died in 1970. In 1972, he married Robert Ellen Corbin Hoke and they settled in Naples, Florida. Colbert died on September 15, 1995, in Naples.

Business positions
Preceded by K. T. Keller; William C. Newberg	President of the Chrysler Corporation; November 3, 1950–April 28, 1960; June 30, 1960–January 27, 1961	Succeeded by William C. Newberg; Lynn A. Townsend
Preceded by K. T. Keller	Chairman of the Chrysler Corporation; April 28, 1960–January 27, 1961	Succeeded by George H. Love
