= William C. Newberg =

American businessman (1910–2003)

- Born: William Charles Newberg; December 17, 1910; Seattle, Washington, U.S.
- Died: December 7, 2003 (aged 92); Reno, Nevada, U.S.
- Education: University of Washington; Chrysler Institute of Engineering
- Occupation: Former Chrysler president
- Years active: 1933–1974
- Spouse: Dorothy Beck (m. 1938)
- Children: 4

William Charles Newberg (December 17, 1910 – December 7, 2003) was an American automotive executive who served as president of Chrysler. His tenure lasted only two months due to a conflict of interest scandal.

== Early life ==
Newberg was born on December 17, 1910, in Seattle to Charles and Anna Newberg. He grew up on a farm near Sedro-Woolley, Washington and worked as a logger, sailor, longshoreman, and car salesman during his youth. He received a degree in engineering from the University of Washington in 1933.

== Chrysler ==
After graduating college, Newberg was hired by Chrysler as a test driver and mechanic. In 1935 he earned his master's in automotive engineering from the Chrysler Institute of Engineering. From 1935 to 1942, he was an engineer for the company. During World War II, Newberg was the chief engineer of the Dodge Chicago Plant, which manufactured B-29 bomber aircraft engines. After the war, Newberg worked for various Chrysler subsidiaries. In 1947, he was named president of Airtemp. Three years later he became vice president of Chrysler's Dodge division. On September 4, 1951, he was named president of Dodge. He was given the additional role of Chrysler Corporation vice president in 1953 and was elected to the board of directors the following year. As part of an executive shuffling in 1956, Newberg was named to the new position of group vice president-automotive, which supervised all of Chrysler's vehicle and Mopar divisions. Two years later he was promoted to executive vice president.

On April 28, 1960, Chrysler president Lester Lum Colbert was elevated to the position of chairman and Newberg succeeded him as president. Colbert, who retained the title of chief executive officer, retained overall management of the corporation while Newberg served as chief operations officer and ran the day-to-day operations. Not long after Newberg took office, Colbert instructed the company's general counsel and independent auditors to look into Newberg's interests in vendor companies. On June 30, 1960, Chrysler announced that Newberg had resigned due to a difference of opinion on corporate policy. On July 21, 1960, the board of directors announced that it had reached a settlement agreement with Newberg over $450,000 in profits he had made from his stake in two parts suppliers.

In 1961, Newberg sued Colbert for $5.2 million and filed a separated suit against Chrysler that sought to cancel his agreement to pay the company $455,000. He alleged that Colbert had long known of his interests in the parts suppliers and had fired him to cover up his own "incompetence, maladministration, neglect, breaches of duty and self-dealing". In 1962, Newberg and Colbert got into a physical altercation in the locker room of the Bloomfield Hills County Club. In 1970, Chrysler agreed to pay Newberg $85,000 in exchange for him dropping his lawsuits.

== Later life ==
After leaving Chrysler, Newberg served as CEO of the Posi-Trac Safety Tire Corporation and president of Astro Programs Inc. In 1974, he moved to Reno, Nevada, where he remained until his death on December 7, 2003.

Business positions
| Preceded by Lester Lum Colbert | President of the Chrysler Corporation; April 28, 1960–June 30, 1960 | Succeeded by Lester Lum Colbert |
