= Marie-Angélique Anel Le Rebours =

- Born: Marie-Angélique Anel; 1731; Paris, Kingdom of France
- Died: 1821 (aged 89–90); Paris, Kingdom of France
- Occupations: Midwife, author, breasfeeding advocate
- Notable work: Avis aux mères qui veulent nourrir leurs enfants ("Advice to Mothers Who Wish to Nurse Their Infants")

Marie-Angélique Anel Le Rebours (1731–1821), also known as Marie-Angelique Anel Le Rebours, Anel Le Rebours, Le Rebours, and Lerebours, was a French midwife and author who wrote an influential and pioneering manual on breastfeeding. Published in 1767, Avis aux mères qui veulent nourrir leurs enfants (“Advice to Mothers Who Wish to Nurse Their Infants”), suggested best practices for lactation and the care of newborns. Breaking from advice conveyed by male writers at the time, she advised women to introduce babies to their breasts within twelve hours of birth instead of waiting for several days.

As the first woman to publish a book about breastfeeding based on her own experiences as a mother, Anel Le Rebours encouraged the practice at a time when more than 90% of French babies were fed by wet-nurses and when infant mortality rates were high. During her lifetime, her book appeared in several French editions and in translations in Dutch, German, and Danish. The philosopher Jean-Jacques Rousseau, who saw breastfeeding as a route to social regeneration, reportedly gave her the idea for writing this book.

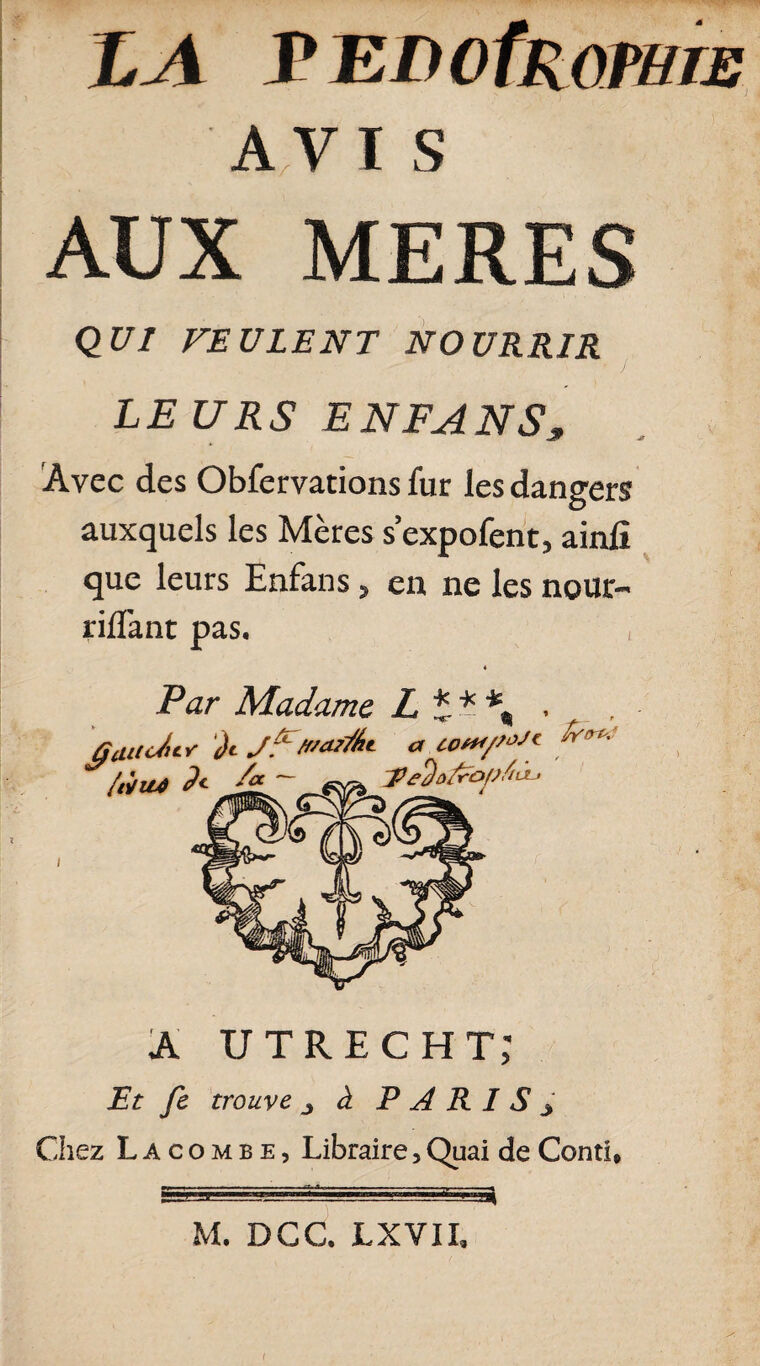
Title page of Avis aux meres qui peulent nourrir leurs enfants ("Advice to Mothers Who Wish to Nurse Their Children") (1767 edition)

== Life and career ==
Marie-Angélique Anel was born at as the daughter of the distinguished French surgeon and military doctor, Dominique Anel, who invented the fine-pointed syringe, the precursor to the modern, hypodermic syringe, to remove dirt and infection from soldiers’ wounds. Her father later achieved distinction for using this syringe to operate on tear ducts in treating fistula lacrymalis.

Anels mother Marie Chaperon, was the daughter of a surgeon from Paris. Marie-Angelique father died in 1740. Anels mother was then left to raise Marie-Angelique and her brother Pierre-Antoine by herself.

Marie-Angélique Anel received a strong academic education. In 1759 after marrying Charles Le Rebours (1731- 1776) who was controller general of the French postal system, she became known as Marie-Angélique Anel Le Rebours. She had at least three children and breastfed two of them, judging from one of her letters to Jean-Jacques Rousseau.

Her husband had a background in education as the assistant of the Latin professor at l'École Royale militaire, and authored a treatise on the ideas of education of César Chesneau Dumarsais; Observations sur les manuscrits de feu M. Dumarsais, avec quelques réflexions sur l'éducation (1760) Later he was the publisher of La Gazette du Commerce (1765)

Anel Le Rebours socialized with illustrious thinkers of her era, including Jean-Jacques Rousseau, Denis Diderot, Jean le Rond d'Alembert, and Pierre Samuel du Pont de Nemours. Diderot and d’Alembert drew on her book for the article on lactation (allaitement) in later editions of their encyclopedia. She corresponded with the Swiss physician Samuel-Auguste Tissot (1728–1797), about his book Avis au peuple sur la santé, which helped to popularize current medical knowledge. She wrote as Enlightenment philosophers were beginning to look favorably upon breastfeeding as a route to collective moral regeneration and human proximity to nature. Her book responded to social fears about depopulation in a period when infant mortality rates were high, when women of all social classes hired wet-nurses, and when two-thirds to ninety percent of wet-nursed babies reportedly died relative to an estimated ten to twenty-five percent of babies fed by their mothers.

== Issue ==
Anel Le Rebours had children.

Her son, Pierre-Rene Lerebours (b. 1754) married Francoise-Melanie Gauffre, daughter of a physician from Cluse. This son was trained as a lawyer and then worked as comptroller of the postal system. He was active in the French Revolution and became captain of the Garde Nationale in Pontarlier in 1791. Close with Robespierre, he countersigned death sentences in his capacity as member of the Committee of Public Safety.

Her son, Victor Lerebours, became an actor under the tutelage of François-Joseph Talma.

== Manual on breastfeeding: editions, translations, and authorship ==
In 1767, writing anonymously as "Madame L.", Marie-Angélique Anel Le Rebours published Avis aux mères qui veulent nourrir leurs enfants avec des observations sur les dangers auxquels les mères s'exposent ainsi que leurs enfans, en ne les nourissant ("Advice to mothers who wish to nurse their infants with observations on the dangers to which mothers expose themselves and their infants if they do not nurse"). After the French Revolution, Anel Le Rebours continued to publish anonymously, but as "La Citoyenne L.R." (Citizen L.R.), with this name reflecting the more ideologically egalitarian tone of the 1790s.

The book was first published in the Netherlands, specifically Utrecht, and in Paris. It appeared in multiple French editions during her lifetime as well as in Dutch, German, and Danish translations. The Dutch edition, which was published in Amsterdam in 1801 by Hugh Smith (c. 1736–1789), an English graduate of the medical school in Leiden, bore a title that signaled its emphasis on the well-being of children, by describing itself as a book dedicated to "teaching in a clear and simple manner what one must do to prepare the constitution of young children for a healthy, long, and happy life".

The book grew with each revision. The first edition was 88 pages, while the third edition was 242. Its pocket-sized format made it transportable and contributed to its appeal as a self-help book.

Jean-Jacques Rousseau, whose 1762 treatise Emile, or On Education reflected his interest in child-rearing, reportedly encouraged her to write this book. The popularity of Rousseau's books Emile and Julie; or, The New Heloise helped to start a fad for breastfeeding that Anel Le Rebours's book tapped into and expanded.

== Advice on lactation and neo-natal care ==
Anel Le Rebours advised women to introduce babies to their breasts within twelve hours of births, instead of waiting for several days, which was what many male experts advised at the time. For women, starting early could prevent painful engorgement of the breasts and mastitis. This advice reflected her book's focus on the health of both mothers and infants.

She took an encouraging tone by writing that, "It is natural to nurse, and if one knows how to do it well, one will easily succeed". Her book's focus on practical advice placed it in what literary scholars would now call the self-help genre. "If you follow my advice exactly," she repeated elsewhere in the book, "you will be certain of success".

She advised against swaddling, a practice that was falling out of vogue, and saw no need to wash newborn babies with a mixture of wine and water, as many advised at the time, declaring water sufficient. Her suggestion in her 1770 second edition of bringing the baby into the warm bed with the mother prompted criticism from the chemist Antoine-François de Fourcroy, who accused her of adhering to "an extreme naturalistic philosophy" by suggesting that humans were like other mammals. Many praised her work, including the French toxicologist Henri-François Gaultier de Claubry and the memoirist Madame Roland, who at the time was imprisoned and who was later executed by guillotine during the French Revolution.

In a period when infant mortality rates were high, her book addressed anxieties, prevalent in late eighteenth-century France, about population decline. Her reassuring tone and upbeat, can-do attitude contributed to her book's popularity.

== Legacy and impact ==
Although Anel Le Rebours practiced as a midwife, she did not receive formal medical training, which was closed to women at the time. In the early 19th century, male medical doctors discredited or displaced her work while emphasizing their own higher scientific credentials. A key figure exemplifying this shift was the French doctor and bacteriologist Alfred Donné (1801–1878), who contributed to the "medicalization of childcare" in his 1842 book, Conseils aux mères sur l’allaitement et sur la manière d’éléver les enfans nouveau-nés (translated into English in 1859 as Mothers and Infants, Nurses and Nursing) which appeared in multiple editions and translations in the years before 1905. Donné based his research on the microscopic study and analysis of human milk. Among other things, and in a break from Le Rebours, Donné argued for more regimentation by feeding babies on fixed schedules.

Feminist scholars have suggested that Anel Le Rebours projected a vision of female autonomy in some respects but contributed to the cult of domesticity in other ways, by encouraging practices that confined women to households, made income-generating work outside the home more difficult, treated breastfeeding as a social and cultural duty, and left women feel guilty for not doing it. Scholars have described her as a precursor to Cora Millet-Robinet, author of the 1841 book entitled, Conseils aux jeunes femmes sur leur condition et leurs devoirs de mère, pendant l’allaitement, and her manual as a precursor to La Leche League International's The Womanly Art of Breastfeeding, published in 1963.
