= Amyloid (mycology) =

Adjective describing a positive test result for starches

In mycology a tissue or feature is said to be amyloid if it has a positive amyloid reaction when subjected to a crude chemical test using iodine as an ingredient of either Melzer's reagent or Lugol's solution, producing a blue to blue-black staining. The term "amyloid" is derived from the Latin amyloideus ("starch-like"). It refers to the fact that starch gives a similar reaction, also called an amyloid reaction. The test can be on microscopic features, such as spore walls or hyphal walls, or the apical apparatus or entire ascus wall of an ascus, or be a macroscopic reaction on tissue where a drop of the reagent is applied. Negative reactions, called inamyloid or nonamyloid, are for structures that remain pale yellow-brown or clear. A reaction producing a deep reddish to reddish-brown staining is either termed a dextrinoid reaction (pseudoamyloid is a synonym) or a hemiamyloid reaction.

== Melzer's reagent reactions ==
Melzer's is used by exposing fungal tissue or cells to the reagent, typically in a microscope slide preparation, and looking for any of three color reactions:

- Amyloid or Melzer's-positive reaction, in which the material reacts blue to black.
- Pseudoamyloid or dextrinoid reaction, in which the material reacts brown to reddish brown.
- Inamyloid or Melzer's-negative, in which the tissues do not change color, or react faintly yellow-brown.

Among the amyloid reaction, two types can be distinguished:

- Euamyloid reaction, in which the material turns blue without potassium hydroxide (KOH)-pretreatment.
- Hemiamyloid reaction, in which the material turns red in Lugol's solution, but shows no reaction in Melzer's reagent; when KOH-pretreated it turns blue in both reagents (hemiamyloidity).

Melzer's reactions are typically almost immediate, though in some cases the reaction may take up to 20 minutes to develop.

The function of the chemicals that make up Melzer's reagent are several. The chloral hydrate is a clearing agent, bleaching and improving the transparency of various dark-colored microscopic materials. The potassium iodide is used to improve the solubility of the iodine, which is otherwise only semi-soluble in water. Iodine is thought to be the main active staining agent in Melzer's; it is thought to react with starch-like polysaccharides in the cell walls of amyloid material, however, its mechanism of action is not entirely understood. It has been observed that hemiamyloid material reacts differently when exposed to Melzer's than it does when exposed to other IKI solutions such as Lugol's, and that in some cases an amyloid reaction is shown in material that had prior exposure to KOH, but an inamyloid reaction without such pretreatment.

An experiment in which spores from 35 species of basidiomycetes were tested for reactions to both Melzer's and Lugol's showed that spores in a large percentage of the species tested display very different reactions between the two reagents. These varied from being weakly or non-reactive in Lugols, to giving iodine-positive reactions in Lugol's but not in Melzer's, to even giving dextrinoid reactions in Lugol's while giving amyloid reactions in Melzer's.

Melzer's degrades into a cloudy precipitate when combined with alkaline solutions, hence it cannot be used in combination or in direct series with such common mycological reagents such as potassium hydroxide or ammonium hydroxide solutions. When potassium hydroxide is used as a pretreatment, the alkalinity must be first neutralized before adding Melzer's.

== Hemiamyloidity ==
Hemiamyloidity in mycology refers to a special case of cell wall amyloidity where the blue staining by iodine only occurs when the tissue was pretreated with potassium hydroxide solution (KOH) or other strong bases, whereas direct application of iodine causes a red reaction when using Lugol's solution, but no reaction when using Melzer's reagent. Hemiamyloidity is so far only known in Ascomycota, but here widespread and an important taxonomic distinction criterion. If cell walls stain blue by iodine reagents without pretreatment with KOH, this is called euamyloid. The term amyloid comprises both variants.

=== Properties ===
A hemiamyloid element of the cell wall does not directly stain blue with iodine reagents added to a water preparation, but only when it has been pretreated with potassium hydroxide solution (KOH). Without KOH pretreatment, the result depends much on the type of iodine reagent: with Lugol's solution (IKI), hemiamyloid structures react red to reddish-brown, whereas any reaction is suppressed when using Melzer's reagent (MLZ). This masking effect (false inamyloidity) is due to the high chloral hydrate concentration in MLZ. The alternative to hemiamyloid is called euamyloid. Euamyloid and KOH-pretreated hemiamyloid structures react blue regardless of the type of iodine reagent. Hemiamyloid and euamyloid reactions may occur at a time, either at spatially separated sites of the cell wall (e.g., ascus apical ring euamyloid, lateral wall hemiamyloid), or as an intermediate type of the same wall region. In the latter case, an overlay of blue and red can be observed in Lugol's solution without KOH pretreatment: a color change from blue to dirty reddish-brown occurs when the iodine reagent slowly diffuses into the water preparation, because the euamyloid reaction appears at lower iodine concentrations than the hemiamyloid reaction. Asci with entirely reactive walls of this type of hemiamyloidity show rainbow-like colours when low-concentrated IKI is applied.

	inamyloid		hemiamyloid		euamyloid	
	IKI	MLZ	IKI	MLZ	IKI	MLZ
prior to KOH	–	–	red	–	blue	blue
KOH-pretreated	–	–	blue	blue	blue	blue

Hemiamyloid (red) reaction in IKI prior to KOH, in comparison with euamyloid (blue) and inamyloid (negative). Only the hemiamyloid reaction strongly depends on the applied iodine reagent (IKI, MLZ) and pretreatment with KOH, being negative in MLZ and blue when KOH-pretreated (in IKI or MLZ). Direct application of IKI to a water munt (without KOH, highlighted) is the easiest way to recognize hemiamyloidity.

	IKI (= Lugol's solution)	MLZ (= Melzer's reagent)
prior to KOH		
KOH-pretreated		

Iodine reaction of hemiamyloid ascus apical rings of Hysteropezizella (Helotiales) in dependence of iodine reagent (IKI, MLZ) and pretreatment with KOH.

=== Occurrence, significance ===
Hemiamyloidity occurs in many groups of ascomycetes. In most members of Lecanorales and Ostropales, whether lichenized or not, the entire outer ascus wall layer reacts hemiamyloid. Roughly 20% of Helotiales have hemiamyloid ascus apical rings compared to estimated 50% with euamyloid apical rings. In Pezizomycetes and different classes of pyrenomycetes hemiamyloid reactions are rare. Although hemiamyloidity is a very valuable taxonomic marker that permits differentiation between species or genera, this type of reaction, in particular the red reaction in IKI, is often overlooked. This neglect occurred since mycologists switched to Melzer's reagent, which was introduced in 1924 and almost completely displaced the previously used Lugol's solution. Hemiamyloidity was first reported by applying Melzer's reagent which gave a negative result without KOH, but a blue reaction when treated with KOH beforehand. Because of the frequency of hemiamyloidity in lichens, lichenologists generally did not join this change but continued using Lugol's solution. The widespread usage of swelling herborized fungi in KOH before study further contributes to the frequent overlooking of hemiamyloidity.

=== Chemistry ===
The chemical background of hemiamyloidity is not clear. A hypothesis claims that short helical sections of a carbohydrate chain alternate with shorter or longer linear sections. The short helical sections, similar to dextrinoidity of glycogen, would cause the red reaction by inclusion of iodine atoms into the spiral, and the linear sections might curl up under the influence of KOH, resulting in long helical chains which cause a blue stain upon iodine inclusion. The hypothetical spiral structure of these macromolecules seems to be related to the extensibility of the ascus wall, which is a prerequisite for the active, explosive ejection of ascospores from an ascus when its high cell turgor is released. A high cell wall extensibility is particularly required at the area of the apical pore-like opening (apical ring), through which the ascospores are pressed when the ascus bursts.

== See also ==
- Color reaction
- Iodine test
