= Cerimetry =

Cerimetry or cerimetric titration, also known as cerate oximetry, is a method of volumetric chemical analysis developed by Ion Atanasiu. It is a redox titration in which an iron(II)–1,10-phenanthroline complex (ferroin) color change indicates the end point. Ferroin can be reversibly discolored in its oxidized form upon titration with a Ce^{4+} solution. The use of cerium(IV) salts as reagents for volumetric analysis was first proposed in the middle of 19th century, but systematic studies did not start until about 70 years later. Standard solutions can be prepared from different Ce^{4+} salts, but often cerium sulfate is chosen.

Since cerimetry is linked to the Fe^{3+}/Fe^{2+} redox pair, it can be used for analyses of nonstoichiometric levels that either oxidize Fe^{2+} or reduce Fe^{3+}. For the case of oxidation, a precise excess of high-purity crystalline Mohr's salt is added upon the oxide digestion in aqueous hydrogen chloride (HCl), while for the case of reduction, an excess of 1 M iron trichloride (FeCl_{3}) is added. In both cases, Fe^{2+} ions will be titrated subsequently. Because the Ce^{4+} solution is prone to hydrolysis, the titration is done in a strongly HCl-acidic solution into which some phosphoric acid (H_{3}PO_{4}) is added to obtain a less colored phosphato complex of Fe^{3+}.

According to tabulated values of standard potentials at pH 0 for the first-row transition metals, any nonstoichiometry below the following oxidation states will reduce 1 M FeCl_{3} solution whereas any nonstoichiometry above them will oxidize the Mohr's salt: Ti^{4+}, V^{4+}, Cr^{3+}, Mn^{2+}, Co^{2+}, and Ni^{2+}. In addition, any nonstoichiometry in the Fe(III)–Fe(II) range is titrated directly with no additives, any nonstoichiometry below Fe^{2+} will reduce 1 M FeCl_{3} whereas any nonstoichiometry above Fe^{3+} will oxidize Mohr's salt. In the second- and third-row transition metals, only the early elements would be suitable for the titration, and the limiting oxidation states are Zr^{4+}, Nb^{5+}, Mo^{4+}, Hf^{4+}, Ta^{5+}, and W^{6+}. Standard potentials involving rhenium ions are too close to E^{0} for Fe^{3+}/Fe^{2+} as well as to each other. Nonstoichiometry of oxides containing several elements in oxidation states suitable for cerimetry is determined in one titration.

== See also ==
- Iodometry
- Redox titration
- Nonstoichiometry
- Redox indicator
- Oxidizing agent
- Reducing agent
