= Redox titration =

Type of titration based on redox reactions

A redox titration is a type of titration based on a redox reaction between the analyte and titrant. It may involve the use of a redox indicator and/or a potentiometer. A common example of a redox titration is the treatment of a solution of iodine with a reducing agent to produce iodide using a starch indicator to help detect the endpoint. For instance, Iodine (I_{2}) can be reduced to iodide (I^{−}) by thiosulfate (S_{2}O^{2−}_{3}), and when all the iodine is consumed, the blue colour disappears. This is called an iodometric titration.

Most often, the reduction of iodine to iodide is the last step in a series of reactions where the initial reactions convert an unknown amount of the solute (the substance being analyzed) to an equivalent amount of iodine, which may then be titrated. Sometimes other halogens (or haloalkanes) besides iodine are used in the intermediate reactions because they are available in better measurable standard solutions and/or react more readily with the solute. The extra steps in iodometric titration may be worthwhile because the equivalence point, where the blue turns a bit colourless, is more distinct than in some other analytical or volumetric methods.

The main redox titration types are:

Redox titration	Titrant
Iodometry	Iodine (I_{2})
Bromatometry	Bromine (Br_{2})
Cerimetry	Cerium(IV) salts
Permanganometry	Potassium permanganate
Dichrometry	Potassium dichromate

== See also ==
- Oxidizing agent
- Reducing agent
