= Barium thiosulfate =

Identifiers
CAS Number	35112-53-9
3D model (JSmol)	Interactive image
ChemSpider	148373
ECHA InfoCard	100.047.599
EC Number	252-375-7
PubChem CID	169663
CompTox Dashboard (EPA)	DTXSID20956550
- InChI: InChI=1S/Ba.H2O3S2/c;1-5(2,3)4/h;(H2,1,2,3,4)/q+2;/p-2 Key: ONPIOWQPHWNPOQ-UHFFFAOYSA-L
- SMILES: [O-]S(=O)(=S)[O-].[Ba+2]

Properties
Chemical formula	BaS_{2}O_{3}
Molar mass	249.46 g/mol
Appearance	White crystalline solid
Melting point	220 °C (decomposes)
Solubility in water	Slightly soluble in water; practically insoluble in ethanol

Hazards
- GHS labelling
Pictograms	(GHS07: Exclamation mark)
Signal word	Warning
Hazard statements	H302, H332
Precautionary statements	P261, P264, P271, P301+P312, P304+P340+P312, P501
- Except where otherwise noted, data are given for materials in their standard state (at 25 °C [77 °F], 100 kPa). Infobox references

Barium thiosulfate is an inorganic compound of barium and the thiosulfate ion, with the chemical formula BaS_{2}O_{3}. It is a white crystalline solid that is only slightly soluble in water. A monohydrate, BaS_{2}O_{3}·H_{2}O, is also known.

== Properties ==
Barium thiosulfate is a white crystalline solid. It is only slightly soluble in water and is practically insoluble in ethanol. A solubility of about 0.25 g per 100 mL of water at 15 °C has been reported.

The monohydrate, BaS_{2}O_{3}·H_{2}O, crystallizes in the orthorhombic crystal system. It has been reported in space group Pbcn (equivalent settings of the structure have also been described as Pnca), with eight formula units per unit cell. Powder diffraction measurements give lattice parameters of approximately a = 7.386 Å, b = 20.050 Å and c = 7.191 Å.

The crystal structure contains discrete thiosulfate ions with approximately tetrahedral geometry around the central sulfur atom. Neutron diffraction studies have also been carried out on the monohydrate.

The monohydrate loses its water of crystallization on heating to about 110 °C. At higher temperatures barium thiosulfate decomposes, with decomposition reported near 220–230 °C. Products reported for the thermal decomposition include barium sulfate, elemental sulfur and sulfur dioxide.

== Preparation ==
Barium thiosulfate can be prepared by precipitation from aqueous solutions of a soluble barium salt and sodium thiosulfate. For example, reaction of barium chloride with sodium thiosulfate gives barium thiosulfate:

BaCl_{2} + Na_{2}S_{2}O_{3} → BaS_{2}O_{3}↓ + 2 NaCl

Barium nitrate can be used similarly:

Ba(NO_{3})_{2} + Na_{2}S_{2}O_{3} → BaS_{2}O_{3}↓ + 2 NaNO_{3}

Because barium thiosulfate is only sparingly soluble in water, it precipitates readily from concentrated solutions. Crystallisation from aqueous solution commonly gives the monohydrate, BaS_{2}O_{3}·H_{2}O.

== Applications ==
Barium thiosulfate has been used in the manufacture of explosives, luminous paints, matches and varnishes. It has also been used as an iodometric standard and in photographic diffusion-transfer processes.
