= Polyiodide =

Anions composed of many iodine atoms

The polyiodides are a class of polyhalogen anions composed entirely of iodine atoms. The most common member is the triiodide ion, I^{−}_{3}. Other known larger polyiodides include [I_{4}]^{2−}, [I_{5}]^{−}, [I_{6}]^{2−}, [I_{7}]^{−}, [I_{8}]^{2−}, [I_{9}]^{−}, [I_{10}]^{2−}, [I_{10}]^{4−}, [I_{11}]^{3−}, [I_{12}]^{2−}, [I_{13}]^{3−}, [I_{14}]^{4-}, [I_{16}]^{2−}, [I_{22}]^{4−}, [I_{26}]^{3−}, [I_{26}]^{4−}, [I_{28}]^{4−} and [I_{29}]^{3−}. All these can be considered as formed from the interaction of the I^{–}, I_{2}, and I^{−}_{3} building blocks.

== Preparation ==
The polyiodides can be made by addition of stoichiometric amounts of I_{2} to solutions containing I^{−} and I^{−}_{3}, with the presence of large countercations to stabilize them. For example, KI_{3}·H_{2}O can be crystallized from a saturated solution of KI when a stoichiometric amount of I_{2} is added and cooled.

== Structure ==
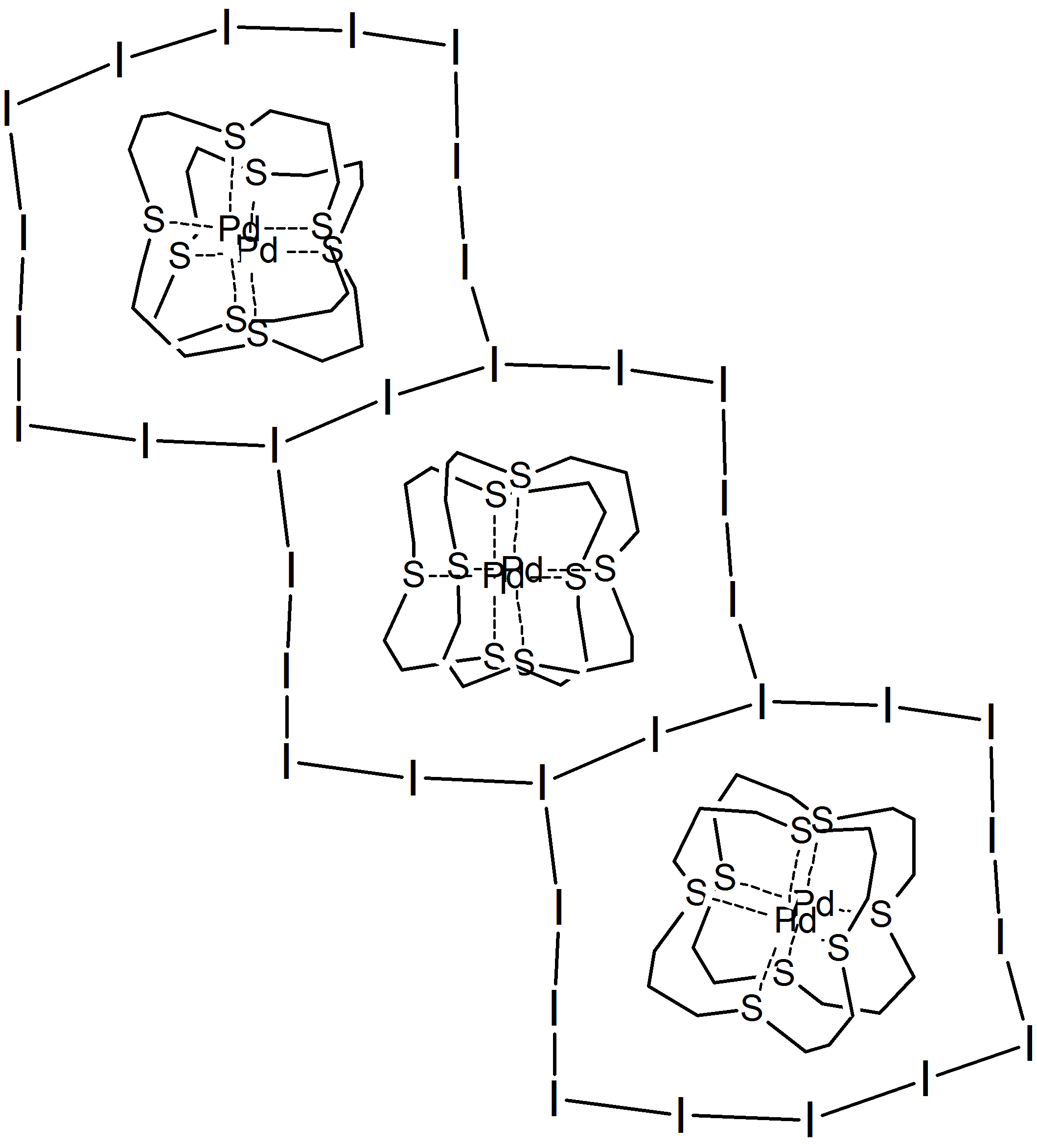
The 14-membered ring array of iodine atoms in [([16]aneS_{4})PdIPd([16]aneS_{4})][I_{11}]

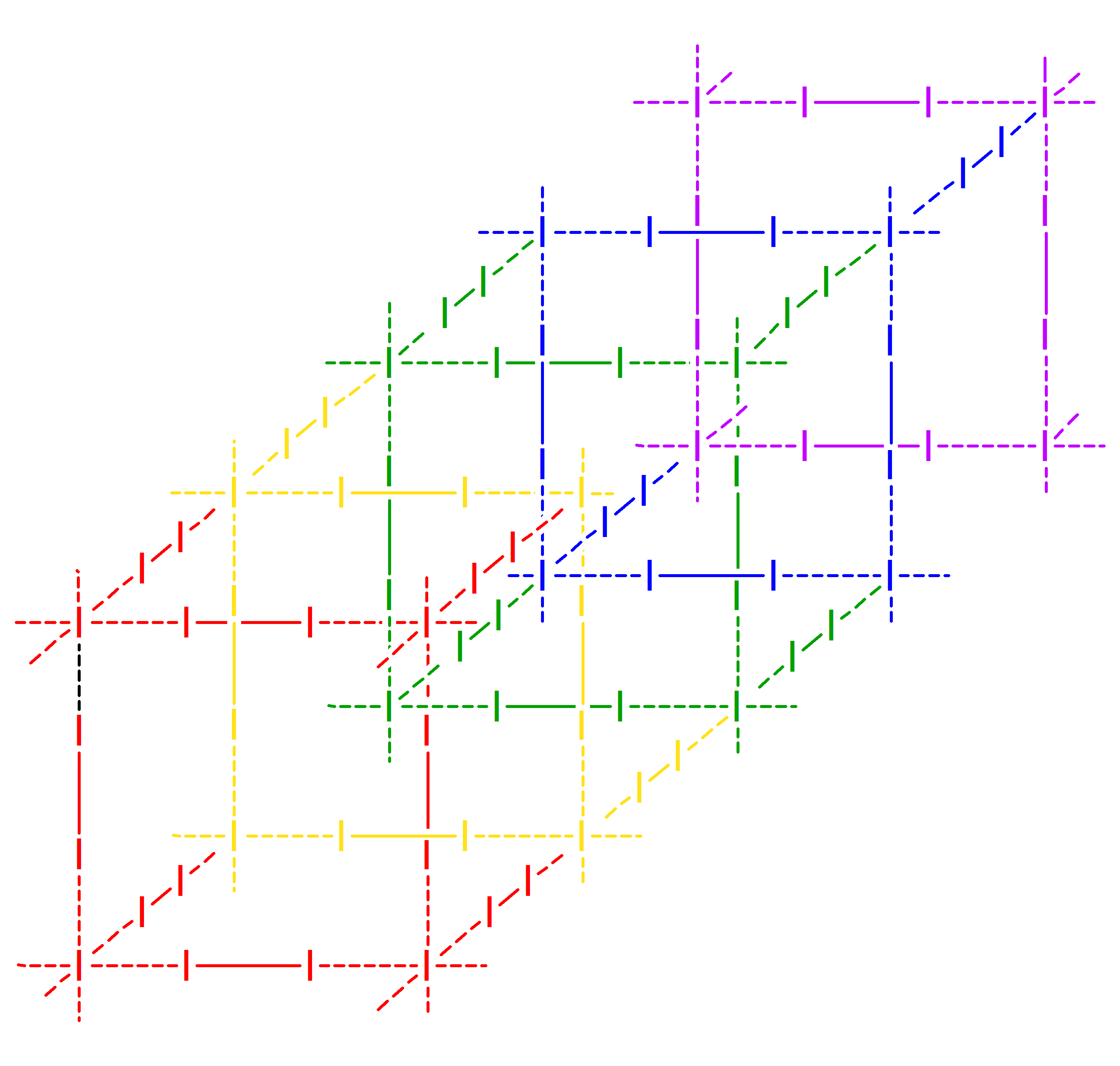
The primitive cubic lattice of iodide ions bridge by I_{2} molecules, present in [Cp*_{2}Fe]_{4}[I_{26}]

Polyiodides adopt diverse structures. Most can be considered as associations of I_{2}, I^{−}, and I^{−}_{3} units. Discrete polyiodides are usually linear. The more complex two- or three-dimensional network structures of chains and cages are formed as the ions interact with each other, with their shapes depending on their associated cations quite strongly, a phenomenon named dimensional caging. The table below lists the polyiodide salts which have been structurally characterized, along with their counter-cation.

Structure of higher polyiodides
Anion	Counter-cation	Structural description
[I_{2}]^{−}	Na(C_{3}H_{6}O)^{+}_{3}	linear
[I_{3}]^{−}	Cs^{+}, (C_{4}H_{9})_{4}N^{+}	linear
[I_{4}]^{2−}	[Cu(NH_{3})_{4}]^{2+}	symmetric linear array of iodine atoms
[I_{5}]^{−}	[EtMe_{3}N]^{+}	V-shaped with polymeric layers
[I_{5}]^{−}	[EtMePh_{2}N]^{+}	V-shaped with isolated [I_{5}]^{−} ions
[I_{6}]^{2−}	[NH_{3}(CH_{2})_{8}NH_{3}]^{2+}	almost linear []
[I_{7}]^{−}	[Ag(18aneS_{6})]^{+}	an anionic network derived from a primitive rhombohedral lattice of iodide ions bridged by I_{2} molecules
[I_{8}]^{2−}	[Ni(phen)_{3}]^{2+}	regular anionic shapes, can be described as [I^{−}_{3}·I_{2}·I^{−}_{3}] or [I^{−}_{3}·I^{−}_{5}]
[I_{9}]^{−}	[Me_{2}^{i}PrPhN]^{+}	14-membered ring tied by two I_{2} bridges to give 10-membered rings
[I_{9}]^{−}	[Me_{4}N]^{+}	non-octahedral, but a twisted "h"-like arrangement of I^{−}_{3} and I_{2} units
[I_{10}]^{2−}	[Cd(12-crown-4)_{2}]^{2+;} Theophyllinium	twisted ring configuration with two I^{−}_{3} units linked by two I_{2} molecules
[I_{11}]^{3−}	[(16aneS_{4})PdIPd(16aneS_{4})]^{3+}	14-membered ring (9.66 × 12.64 Å) around the complex cation, with the rings interlink further to give an infinite 2D sheet
[I_{12}]^{2−}	[Ag_{2}(15aneS_{5})_{2}]^{2+}	extended 3D spiral superstructure supported by Ag–I bonds and weak I⋯S interactions
[I_{12}]^{2−}	[Cu(Dafone)_{3}]^{2+}	planar configuration
[I_{13}]^{3−}	[Me_{2}Ph_{2}N]^{+}	consists of zigzag chains of I^{−} and I_{2}
[I_{14}]^{4−}	4,4′-bipyridinium	double hook [I^{−}_{3}·I_{2}·I^{−}·I_{2}·I^{−}·I_{2}·I^{−}_{3}]
[I_{16}]^{2−}	[Me_{2}Ph_{2}N]^{+}	centrosymmetric arrangement of [I^{−}_{7}·I_{2}·I^{−}_{7}]
[I_{16}]^{2−}	[^{i}PrMe_{2}PhN]^{+}	the anion forms 14-membered rings catenated by I_{2} molecules, which further link into layers with 10- and 14-membered rings
[I_{22}]^{4−}	[MePh_{3}P]^{+}	two L-shaped [I_{5}]^{−} units linked by an I_{2} molecule and completed by two end-on [I_{5}]^{−} groups
[I_{26}]^{3−}	[Me_{3}S]^{+}	consists of [I_{5}]^{−} and [I_{7}]^{−} ions with intercalated I_{2} molecules
[I_{26}]^{4−}	Cp*_{2}Fe^{+}	an anionic network derived from a primitive cubic lattice built from I^{−} ions, with I_{2} bridges on all edges and systematically removing 1/12 of the I_{2} molecules
[I_{29}]^{3−}	Cp_{2}Fe^{+}	an anionic 3D network with a cage-like structure of [{(I^{−}_{5})_{1/2}·I_{2}}·{(I^{2−}_{12})_{1/2}·I_{2}}·I_{2}], with [Cp_{2}Fe]^{+} ions interacting with the anion in the cavities
[I_{∞}]^{δ−}	Pyrroloperylene^{+•}	Infinite polyiodide homopolymer.

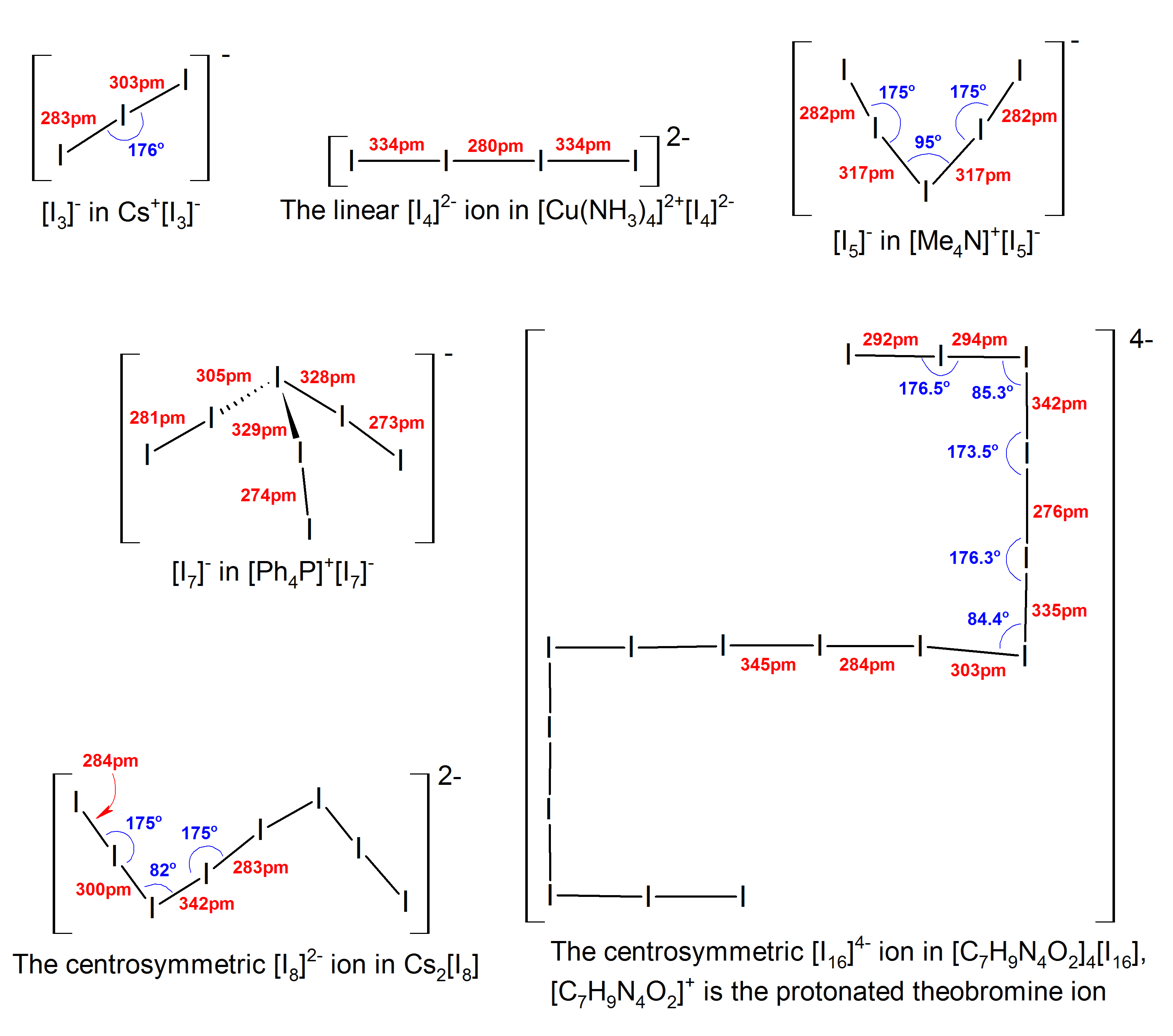
Structures of some polyiodide ions.

== Reactivity ==
Polyiodide compounds are generally sensitive to light.

Triiodide, I^{−}_{3}, undergoes unimolecular photodissociation. Polyiodide has been used to improve the scalability in the synthesis of halide perovskite photovoltaic materials.

== Conductivity ==
Solid state compounds containing linear-chain polyiodide ions exhibit enhanced conductivity than their simple iodide counterparts. The conductivity can be drastically modified by external pressure, which changes the interatomic distances between iodine moieties and the charge distribution.

== See also ==
- Triiodide
- Polyhalogen ions
- Iodine–starch test
- Dye-sensitized solar cell
- Halogen bond
- Catenation
- Inorganic polymer
