= Ion Atanasiu =

Romanian chemist

Ion A. Atanasiu (25 September 1894 – 19 December 1978) was the founder of the Romanian School of Electrochemistry and the first to teach this subject in Romania. He is known as the originator of cerimetry, an analytical method based on Cerium (IV) as titration reagent.

== Works ==
I. Atanasiu, G. Facsko, Electrochimie. Principii teoretice, 1958
