= Bromatometry =

Bromatometry is a titration process in which the bromination of a chemical indicator is observed.

Potassium bromate alone can be used for the analysis of organoarsenicals.

== See also ==
- Iodometry
