= Dominique Anel =

French surgeon

- Born: c. 1679; Toulouse
- Died: c. 1730
- Occupation: Surgeon
- Known for: Surgical treatment of fistula lacrymalis

Dominique Anel (c. 1679 – c. 1730), was a French surgeon who was born at Toulouse, Languedoc. Anel was a pupil of well-known French surgeons J. L. Petit (1674-1750) and Georges Mareschal (1658-1736). After studying at Montpellier and Paris, he served as surgeon-major in the French army in Alsace; then after two years at Vienna he went to Italy and served in the Austrian army. In 1710 he was teaching surgery in Rouen, whence he went to Genoa, and in 1716 he was practising in Paris.

In military, Anel’s job was to clean soldiers’ wounds at the battle fields. He invented a small suction syringe which was used to remove much of the dirt and infection. This prevented the professional ‘suckers’ who followed the armies at that time to offer lip-service for money. Anel’s syringe survived with modification for 250 years. This became the forerunner of modern aspirator. Based on this unique design, hypodermic syringes were ultimately improved.

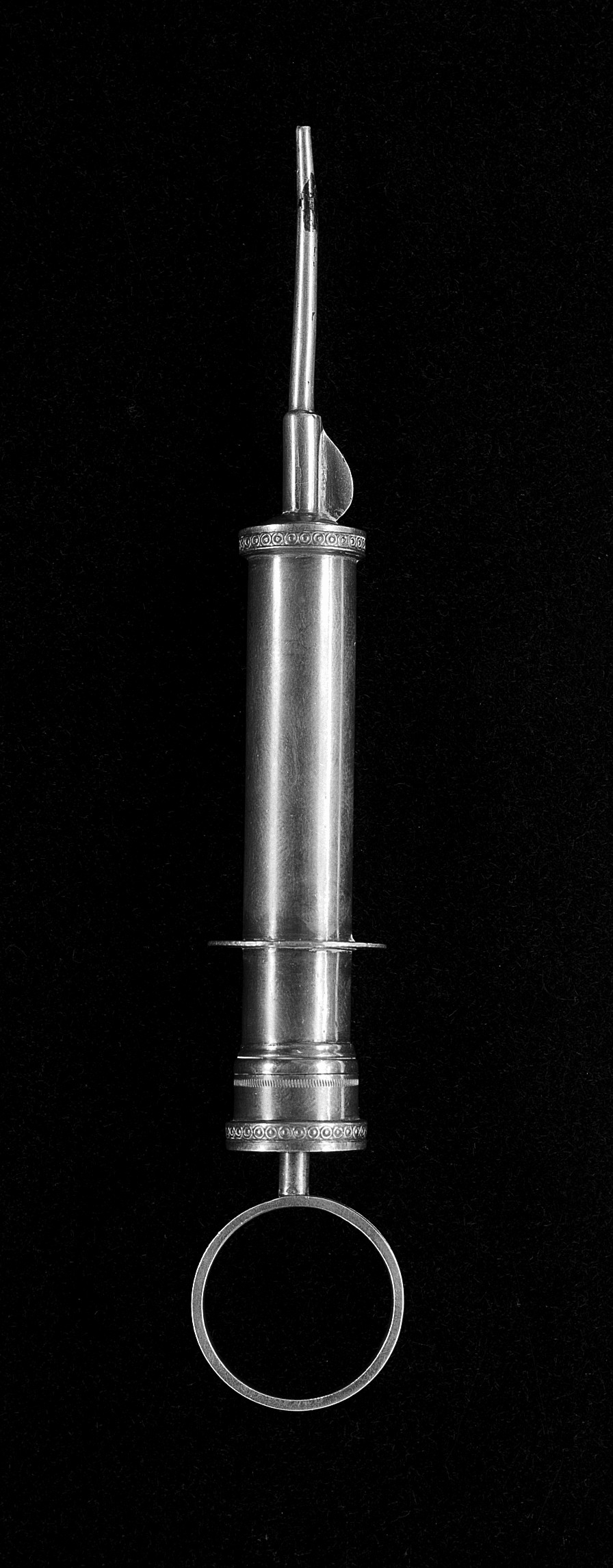
The Anel syringe. Credit: Wellcome Collection

Anel was celebrated for his successful surgical treatment of fistula lacrymalis, and while at Genoa invented for use in connection with the operation the fine-pointed syringe known by his name. In 1713, Anel became famous after he treated the Duchess of Savoy for lacrimal fistulae in a period of ten days.

His daughter was Marie-Angélique Anel Le Rebours, the first woman to write a book and manual about breastfeeding.
