= Iodine–starch test =

Method to detect presence of polysaccharides

- Schematic view of I_{3}^{−} ions embedded in amylose helix
- Classification: Colorimetric method
- Analytes: Starch

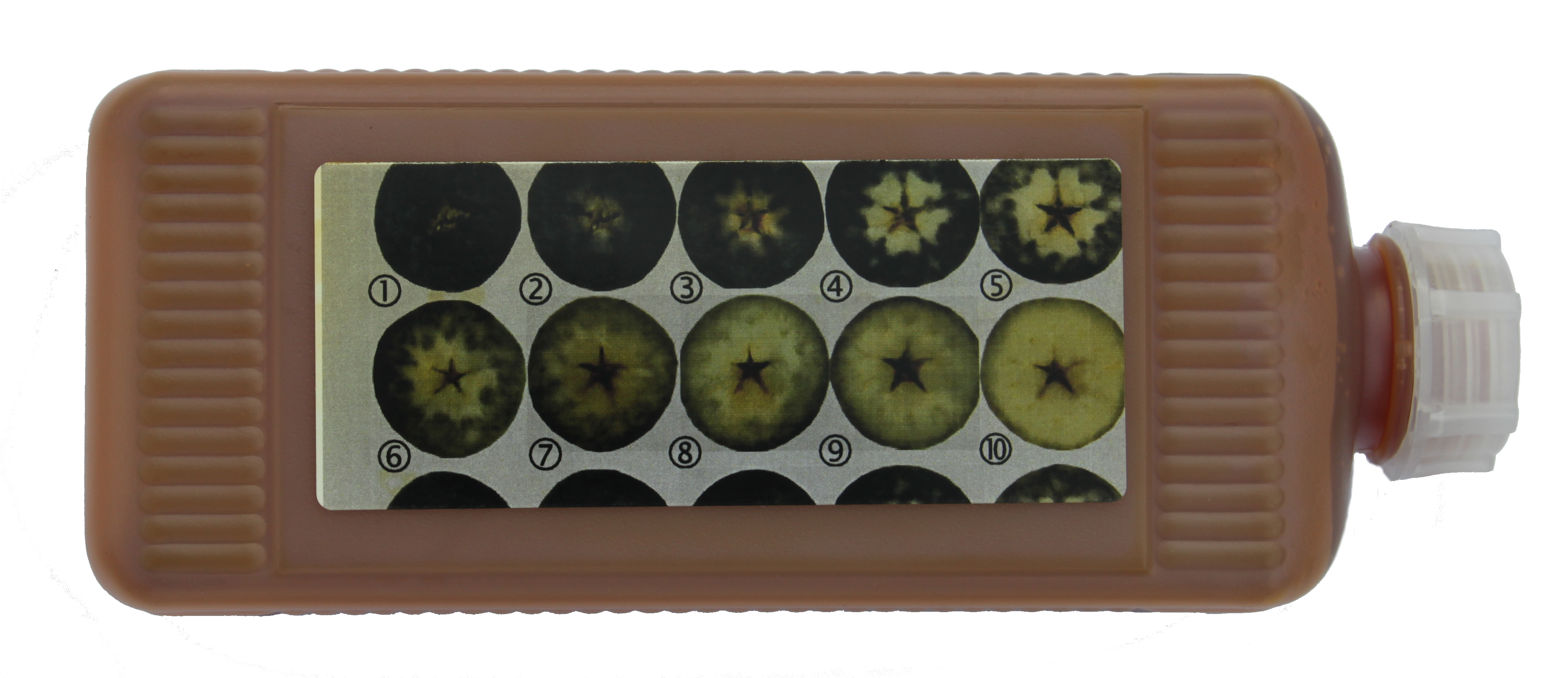
A bottle of iodine solution used on apples to determine the correct harvest time. The chart shows the level of residual starch.

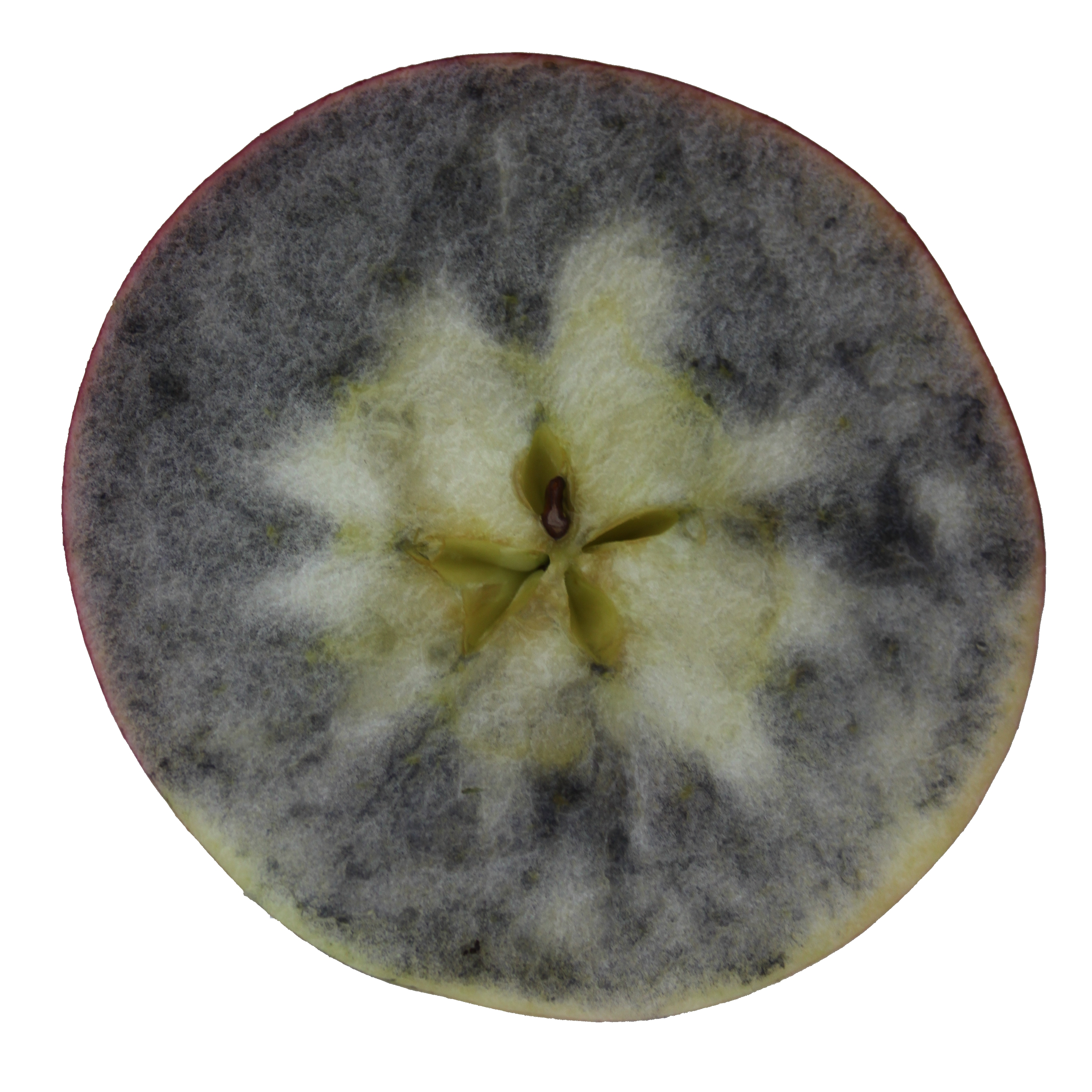
The cut surface of an apple stained with iodine, indicating a starch level of 4–5.

The iodine–starch test is a chemical reaction that is used to test for the presence of starch or for iodine. The combination of starch and iodine is intensely blue-black. The interaction between starch and the triiodide anion (I^{−}_{3}) is the basis for iodometry.

== History and principles ==
The iodine–starch test was first described in 1814 by Jean-Jacques Colin and Henri-François Gaultier de Claubry, and independently by Friedrich Stromeyer the same year.

In 1937, Canadian-American biochemist Charles S. Hanes extensively investigated the action of amylases on starch and the changes in iodine coloration during starch degradation and proposed a spiral chain conformation for the starch molecule, suggesting that fragments with more than one complete coil of the spiral might be necessary for iodine coloration.

Karl Freudenberg et al., in 1939, building upon Hanes' helical model, proposed that the helical conformation of amylose creates a hydrophobic cavity lined with CH groups, which attracts iodine molecules and leads to a shift in iodine's absorption spectrum, explaining the characteristic blue color of the complex.

This model was subsequently confirmed by Robert E. Rundle and co-workers ca. 1943, who used X-ray diffraction and optical studies to provide experimental evidence for the linear arrangement of iodine molecules within the amylose helix.

Research in the mid-20th century began to highlight the importance of iodide anion (as opposed to neutral molecules) in the complex formation, particularly in aqueous solutions. Studies by Mukherjee and Bhattacharyya demonstrated in 1946 that varying potassium iodide concentrations affected the ratio of I^{–} to I_{2} in the complex. Thoma and French in 1960 further emphasized the necessity of iodide for complex formation in aqueous media.

By the 1980s, the presence of polyiodide chains within the amylose helix became widely accepted. However, the precise composition/structure of these chains, including the balance between molecular iodine and various iodide anions, continues to be debated and investigated, with a 2022 article suggesting that they might alternate.

The triiodide anion instantly produces an intense blue-black colour upon contact with starch. The intensity of the colour decreases with increasing temperature and with the presence of water-miscible organic solvents such as ethanol. It is thought that the iodine–iodide mixture combines with the starch to form an infinite polyiodide homopolymer. This was rationalized through single-crystal X-ray crystallography and comparative Raman spectroscopy.

== Starch as an indicator ==
Starch is often used in chemistry as an indicator for redox titrations where triiodide is present. Starch forms a very dark blue-black complex with triiodide. However, the complex is not formed if only iodine or only iodide (I^{−}) is present. The colour of the starch complex is so deep, that it can be detected visually when the concentration of the iodine is as low as 20 μM at 20 °C. During iodine titrations, concentrated iodine solutions must be reacted with some titrant, often thiosulfate, in order to remove most of the iodine before the starch is added. This is due to the insolubility of the starch–triiodide complex which may prevent some of the iodine reacting with the titrant. Close to the endpoint, the starch is added, and the titration process is resumed taking into account the amount of thiosulfate added before adding the starch.

The color change can be used to detect moisture or perspiration, as in the Minor test or starch–iodine test.

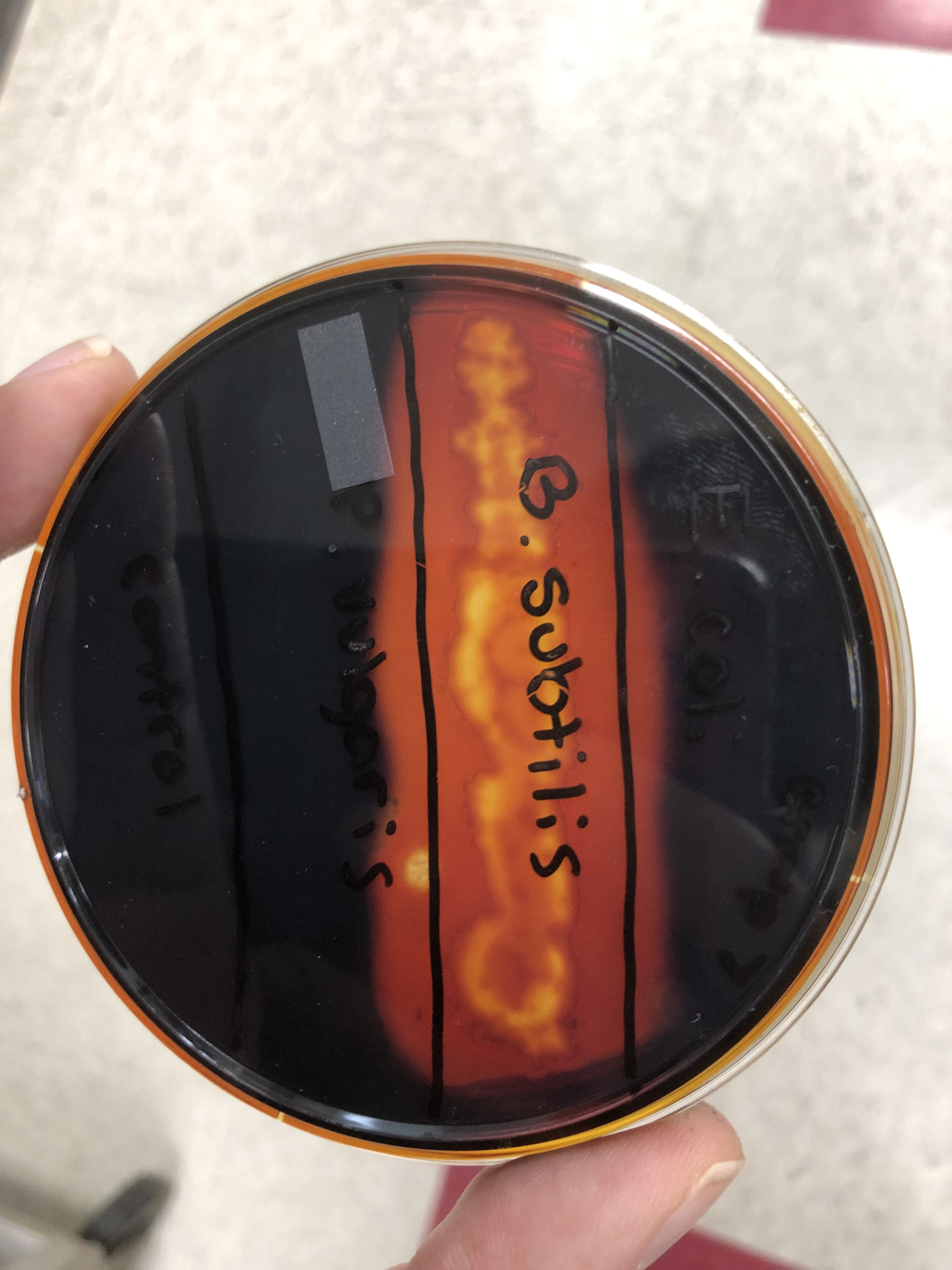
A starch agar plate filled up with iodine. A halo is present around B. subtilis.

Starch is also useful in detecting the enzyme amylase, which breaks down starch into sugars. Many bacteria like Bacillus subtilis can produce such an enzyme to help scientists identify unknown bacterial samples – the starch–iodine test is one of many tests needed to identify the exact bacterium. The positive test for bacteria that has starch hydrolysis capabilities (able to produce amylase) is the presence of a yellow zone around a colony when iodine is added to detect starch.

== Medical use ==
Although the starch-iodine test is predominantly employed in the lab, recent assessments have shown potential for clinical use, such as confirming the diagnosis of Horner's syndrome. Hospitals with limited technical accessibility can exploit this diagnostic tool since it requires resources that may be easily attainable. In order to perform the experiment, a patient's skin is first dried with 70% alcohol after which the iodine solution is added. After the skin dries completely once more, it will be dusted with a starch material. Inducing sweating conditions will cause the skin to turn dark blue. Physicians can then make a diagnosis if the test shows sweating of different intensities on the left and right side of the body.

== See also ==
- Lugol's iodine
- Counterfeit banknote detection pen
