= Henri-François Gaultier de Claubry =

French chemist (1792–1878)

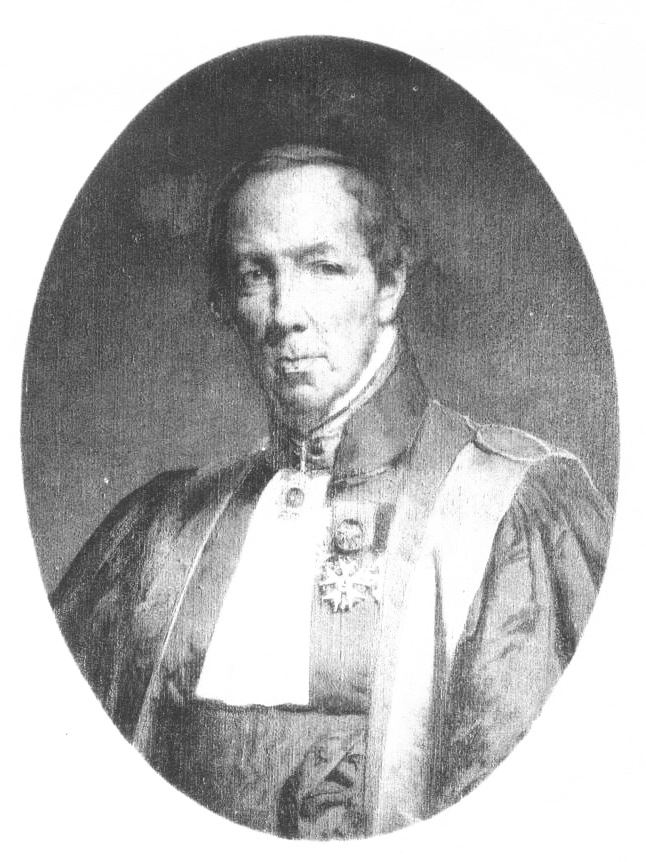

Henri-François Gaultier de Claubry (21 Jul 1792 – 4 Jul 1878) was a French chemist and toxicologist. Following the discovery of iodine in 1811, he examined its properties along with Jean-Jacques Colin (1784-1865) and identified its ability to react with starch in 1814.

== Biography ==
Gaultier de Claubry was born in Paris, son of well-known physician Charles-Daniel. After beginning studies in medicine, he shifted to research and began to apprentice in the pharmacies of Pelletier and Boudet and at the Hôpital de la Charité before joining the laboratory of Gay Lussac at the École Polytechnique. He then worked under Louis Jacques Thenard at the Faculty of Sciences. In 1812 he translated William Henry's Elements of Experimental Chemistry into French.

=== Iodine–starch test ===
The iodine–starch test was first described in 1814 by Gaultier de Claubry and Jean-Jacques Colin, and independently by Friedrich Stromeyer the same year.

=== Classification of minerals ===
His thesis published in 1824 was on the classification of minerals. His work was a critique of the method of Berzelius in which he had disregarded physical forms, depending only on chemical composition and proportions. The minerals examined were silicates.

=== Public health ===
Gaultier de Claubry was also involved in public health after being elected to the Conseil d'Hygiène of the Department of the Seine in 1825 and worked particularly on the testing and examination of products for adulteration, hygiene and disinfection. He thought plague was a variety of typhus as also typhoid although he considered typhus to be aided by overcrowding unlike typhoid.

In 1835 he became a professor of chemistry at the École de Pharmacie. He was elected to the Académie Nationale de Médecine in 1848 and was made officer of the Légion d'honneur in 1849.
