= Jean-Jacques Colin =

French chemist (1784–1865)

Jean-Jacques Colin (16 December 1784 – 1865) was a French chemist known for his work in plant physiology, fermentation, and the chemistry of iodine. He collaborated with Henri-François Gaultier de Claubry on research demonstrating the interaction between iodine and starch, and with Pierre Jean Robiquet on the isolation of alizarin and purpurin from madder root. Colin held teaching positions at the École Polytechnique, the University of Sciences in Dijon, and the École spéciale militaire de Saint-Cyr. Over his career, he published research across chemistry, mineralogy, and biology, contributing to studies on seed germination, fermentation, dye production, and soap manufacturing.

== Early life and education ==
Jean-Jacques Colin was born on 16 December 1784 in Riom, Department of Puy-de-Dôme, France. He was appointed a répétiteur (tutor) of chemistry at the École Polytechnique under Joseph Louis Gay-Lussac, a post he held until 1817. Following the political changes after the Restoration, his salary was reduced, leading to his resignation.

== Career ==
In 1818, Colin was appointed professor of chemistry at the University of Sciences in Dijon. He also taught at the École spéciale militaire de Saint-Cyr and served as a corresponding member of the Philomatic society.

Colin published research across inorganic and organic chemistry, mineralogy, entomology, and plant physiology. Together with Henri-François Gaultier de Claubry, he studied the chemical interactions between iodine and organic substances, observing the reaction between iodine and starch. In collaboration with Pierre-Jean Robiquet, he contributed to the isolation of alizarin and purpurin from madder root.

Colin co-authored studies on seed germination, respiration, and the effects of temperature and humidity on cereal crops. He conducted research on fermentation processes involving organic materials and alcohol production. His additional studies addressed indigo extraction, soap manufacturing, stain removal from textiles, and the properties of pyroligneous acid and creosote.

Colin authored approximately 30 scientific papers and books. He died in 1865.

== Bibliography ==
- Colin, Jean-Jacques (1827). Cours de chimie à l'usage de MM. les élèves de l'École militaire de Saint-Cyr. Paris: Thomine.
- Colin, Jean-Jacques (1841). Considérations élémentaires sur les proportions chimiques, les équivalents et les atomes, pour servir d'introduction à l'étude de la chimie. Paris: Gauthier-Laguionie.
- Robiquet, Pierre-Jean; Colin, Jean-Jacques (1826). "Sur un nouveau principe immédiat des végétaux (l'alizarine) obtenu de la garance". Journal de Pharmacie. 12 (2): 407–412.
- Robiquet, Pierre-Jean; Colin, Jean-Jacques (1827). "Nouvelles recherches sur la matière colorante de la garance". Annales de Chimie et de Physique. 2. 34: 225–253.
- Colin, Jean-Jacques (1825). "Mémoire sur la fermentation du sucre". Annales de Chimie. 28: 128–142.
- Colin, Jean-Jacques (1825). "Mémoire sur la fermentation. Deuxième partie". Annales de Chimie. 30: 42–64.
- Colin, Jean-Jacques (1842). "Nouveaux mémoire sur la fermentation". Mémoires de la Société des Sciences Naturelles et Archéologiques de Seine-et-Oise. 2: 1–43.
- Colin, Jean-Jacques; Gaultier de Claubry, Henri-François (1814). "Sur les combinaisons de l'iode avec les substances végétales et animales". Annales de Chimie. 90: 87–100.
