= Iodometry =

Quantitative analysis of a water-soluble oxidizing agent

Iodometry, known as iodometric titration, is a method of volumetric chemical analysis, a redox titration where the appearance or disappearance of elementary iodine indicates the end point.

Note that iodometry involves indirect titration of iodine liberated by reaction with the analyte, whereas iodimetry involves direct titration using iodine as the titrant.

Redox titration using sodium thiosulphate, Na_{2}S_{2}O_{3} (usually) as a reducing agent is known as iodometric titration since it is used specifically to titrate iodine. The iodometric titration is a general method to determine the concentration of an oxidising agent in solution. In an iodometric titration, a starch solution is used as an indicator since it can absorb the I_{2} that is released, visually indicating a positive iodine-starch test with a deep blue hue. This absorption will cause the solution to change its colour from deep blue to light yellow when titrated with standardized thiosulfate solution. This indicates the end point of the titration. Iodometry is commonly used to analyze the concentration of oxidizing agents in water samples, such as oxygen saturation in ecological studies or active chlorine in swimming pool water analysis.

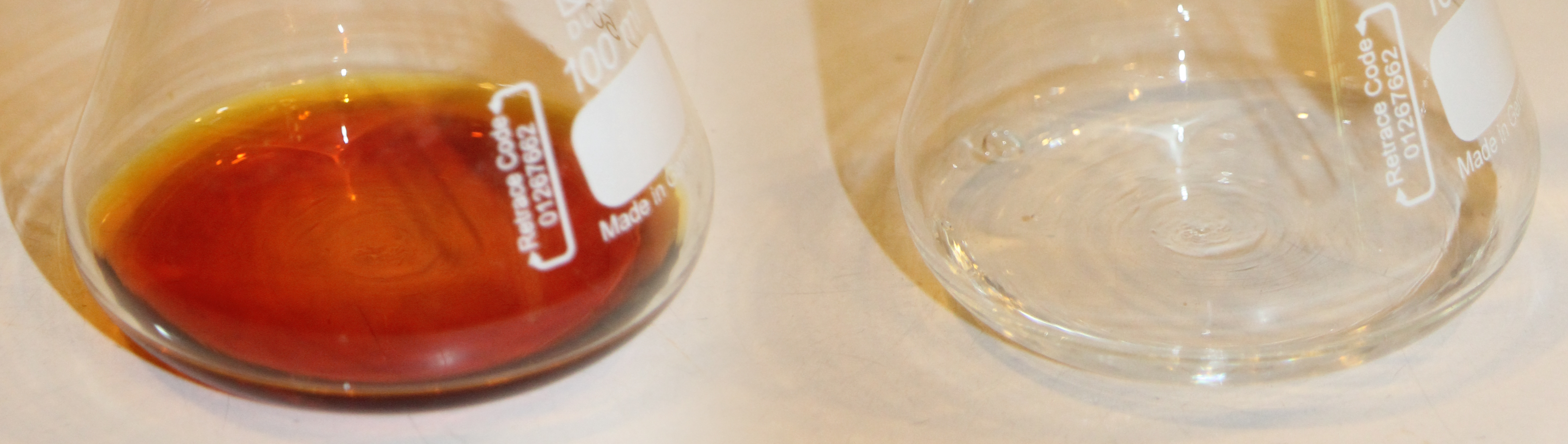
Color of iodometric titration mixture before (left) and after (right) the end point

== Basic principles ==
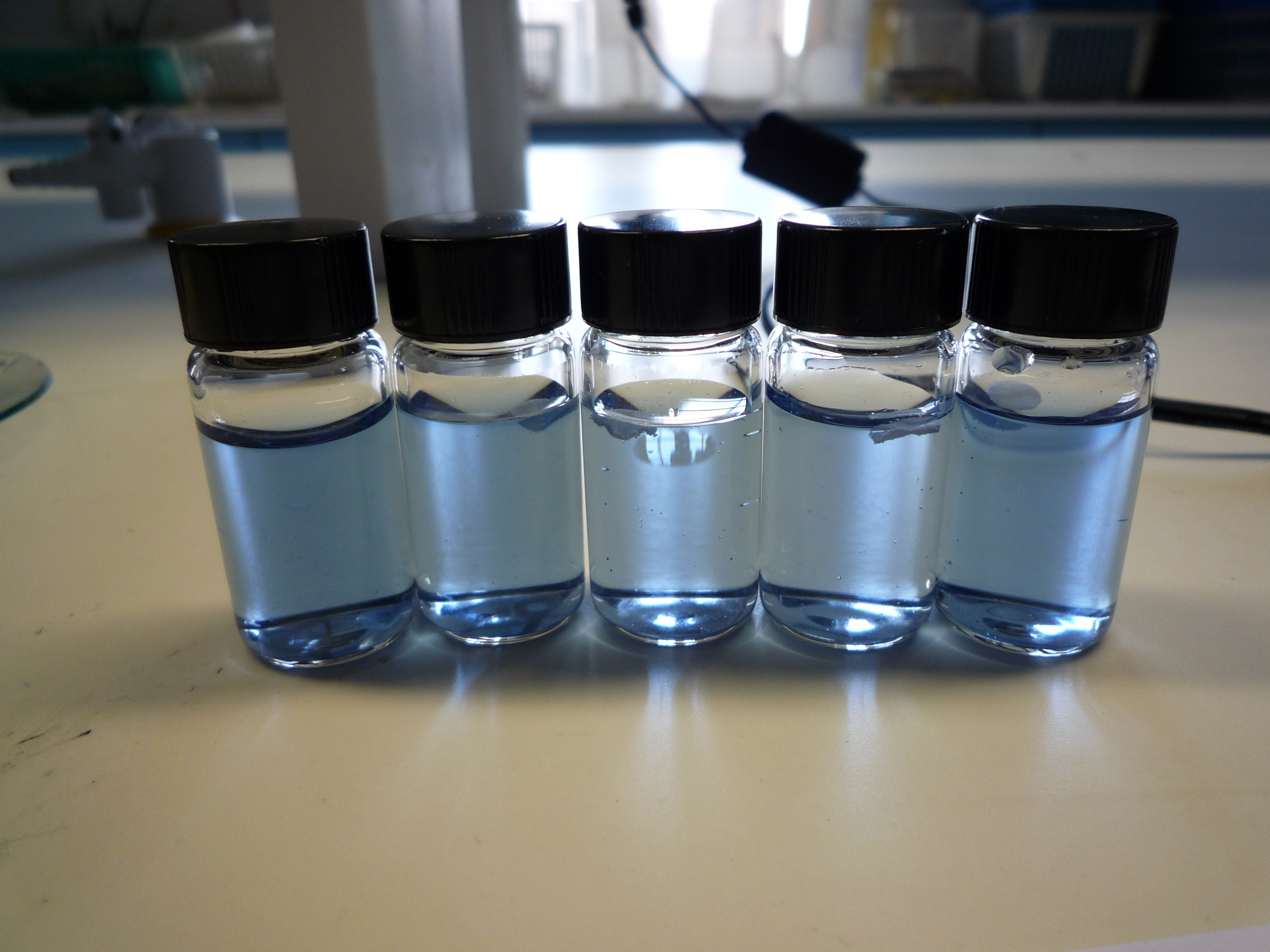
Dilute solutions containing iodine–starch complex. Using starch as an indicator can help create a sharper color change at the endpoint (dark blue to colorless). The color above can be seen just before the endpoint is reached.

To a known volume of sample, an excess but known amount of I^{−} is added, which the oxidizing agent then oxidizes to I_{2}. I_{2} dissolves in the iodide-containing solution to give triiodide ions (I_{3}^{−}), which have a dark brown color. The triiodide ion solution is then titrated against standard thiosulfate solution to give iodide again using starch indicator:

I^{−}_{3} + 2 e^{−} ⇌ 3 I^{−} (E^{0} = +0.54 V)

Together with reduction potential of thiosulfate:

S_{4}O^{2−}_{6} + 2 e^{−} ⇌ 2 S_{2}O^{2−}_{3} (E^{0} = +0.08 V)

The overall reaction is thus:

I^{−}_{3} + 2 S_{2}O^{2−}_{3} → S_{4}O^{2−}_{6} + 3 I^{−} (E_{reaction} = +0.46 V)

For simplicity, the equations will usually be written in terms of aqueous molecular iodine rather than the triiodide ion, as the iodide ion did not participate in the reaction in terms of mole ratio analysis. The disappearance of the deep blue color is, due to the decomposition of the iodine-starch clathrate, marks the end point.

The reducing agent used does not necessarily need to be thiosulfate; stannous chloride, sulfites, sulfides, arsenic(III), and antimony(III) salts are commonly used alternatives at pH above 8.

At low pH, the following reaction might occur with thiosulfate:

S_{2}O^{2−}_{3} + 2 H^{+} → SO_{2} + S + H_{2}O

Some reactions involving certain reductants are reversible at certain pH, thus the pH of the sample solution should be carefully adjusted before performing the analysis. For example, the reaction:

H_{3}AsO_{3} + I_{2} + H_{2}O → H_{3}AsO_{4} + 2 H^{+} + 2 I^{−}

is reversible at pH below 4.

The volatility of iodine is also a source of error for the titration, this can be effectively prevented by ensuring an excess iodide is present and cooling the titration mixture. Strong light, nitrite and copper ions catalyse the conversion of iodide to iodine, so these should be removed prior to the addition of iodide to the sample.

For prolonged titrations, it is advised to add dry ice to the titration mixture to displace air from the Erlenmeyer flask so as to prevent the aerial oxidation of iodide to iodine. Standard iodine solution is prepared from potassium iodate and potassium iodide, which are both primary standards:

IO^{−}_{3} + 8 I^{−} + 6 H^{+} → 3 I^{−}_{3} + 3 H_{2}O

Iodine in organic solvents, such as diethyl ether and carbon tetrachloride, may be titrated against sodium thiosulfate dissolved in acetone.

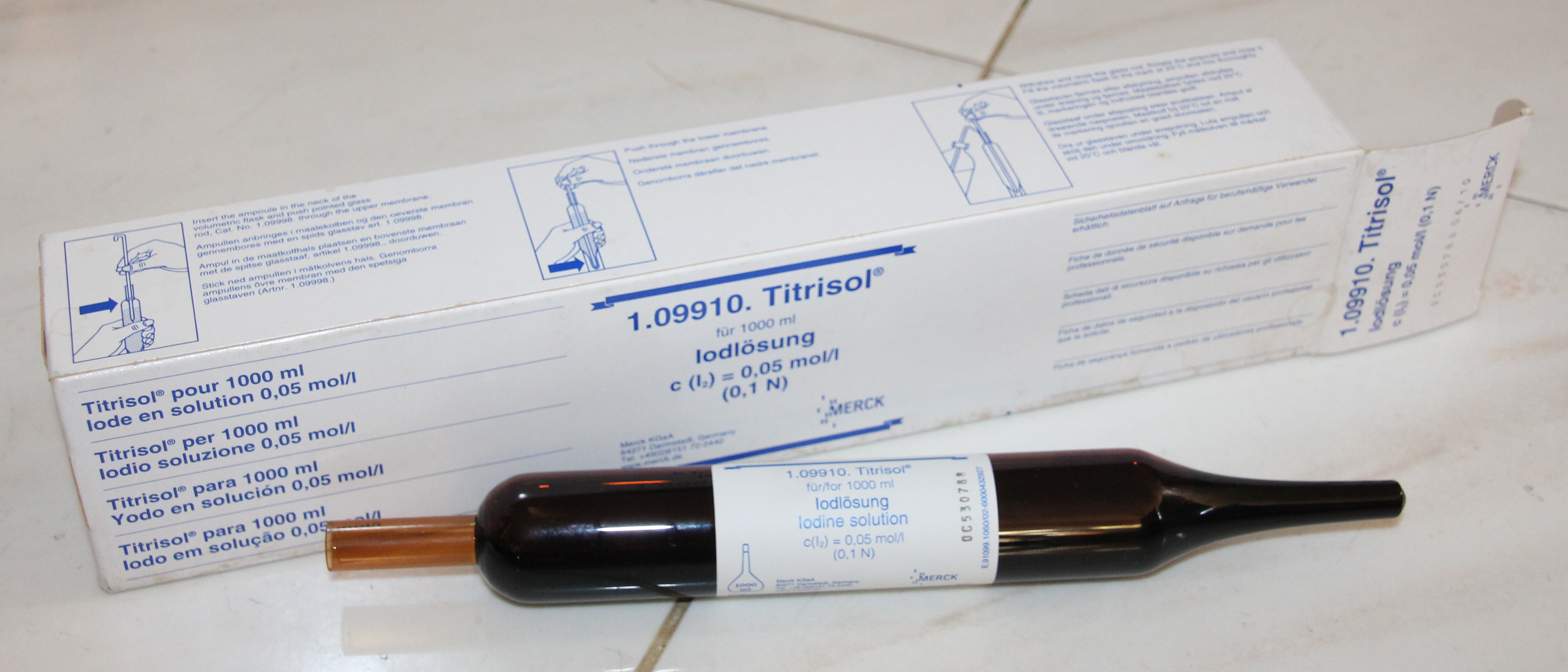
Iodine standard solution, sealed in an ampoule for iodometric analysis.

== Applications ==
Iodometry in its many variations is extremely useful in volumetric analysis. Examples include the determination of copper(II), chlorate, hydrogen peroxide, and dissolved oxygen:

2 Cu^{2+} + 4 I^{−} → 2 CuI + I_{2}
6 H^{+} + ClO^{−}_{3} + 6 I^{−} → 3 I_{2} + Cl^{−} + 3 H_{2}O
2 H^{+} + H_{2}O_{2} + 2 I^{−} → I_{2} + 2 H_{2}O
2 H_{2}O + 4 Mn(OH)_{2} + O_{2} → 4 Mn(OH)_{3}
2 Mn^{3+} + 2 I^{−} → I_{2} + 2 Mn^{2+}

Available chlorine refers to chlorine liberated by the action of dilute acids on hypochlorite. Iodometry is commonly employed to determine the active amount of hypochlorite in bleach responsible for the bleaching action. In this method, excess but known amount of iodide is added to known volume of sample, in which only the active (electrophilic) can oxidize iodide to iodine. The iodine content and thus the active chlorine content can be determined with iodometry.

The determination of arsenic(VI) compounds is the reverse of the standardization of iodine solution with sodium arsenite, where a known and excess amount of iodide is added to the sample:

As_{2}O_{5} + 4 H^{+} + 4 I^{−} ⇌ As_{2}O_{3} + 2 I_{2} + 2 H_{2}O

For analysis of antimony(V) compounds, some tartaric acid is added to solubilize the antimony(III) product.

=== Determination of hydrogensulfites and sulfites ===
Sulfites and hydrogensulfites reduce iodine readily in acidic medium to iodide. Thus when a diluted but excess amount of standard iodine solution is added to known volume of sample, the sulfurous acid and sulfites present reduces iodine quantitatively:

SO^{2−}_{3} + I_{2} + H_{2}O → SO^{2−}_{4} + 2 H^{+} + 2 I^{−}

HSO^{−}_{3} + I_{2} + H_{2}O → SO^{2−}_{4} + 3 H^{+} + 2 I^{−}

(This application is used for iodimetry titration because here iodine is directly used)

=== Determination of sulfides and hydrogensulfides ===
Although the sulfide content in sample can be determined straight forwardly as described for sulfites, the results are often poor and inaccurate. A better, alternative method with higher accuracy is available, which involves the addition of excess but known volume of standard sodium arsenite solution to the sample, during which arsenic trisulfide is precipitated:

As_{2}O_{3} + 3 H_{2}S → As_{2}S_{3} + 3 H_{2}O

The excess arsenic trioxide is then determined by titrating against standard iodine solution using starch indicator. Note that for the best results, the sulfide solution must be dilute with the sulfide concentration not greater than 0.01 M.

=== Determination of hexacyanoferrate(III) ===
When iodide is added to a solution of hexacyanoferrate(III), the following equilibrium exists:

2 [Fe(CN)_{6}]^{3−} + 2 I^{−} ⇌ 2 [Fe(CN)_{6}]^{4−} + I_{2}

Under strongly acidic solution, the above equilibrium lies far to the right hand side, but is reversed in almost neutral solution. This makes analysis of hexacyanoferrate(III) troublesome as the iodide and thiosulfate decomposes in strongly acidic medium. To drive the reaction to completion, an excess amount of zinc salt can be added to the reaction mixture containing potassium ions, which precipitates the hexacyanoferrate(II) ion quantitatively:

2 [Fe(CN)_{6}]^{3−} + 2 I^{−} + 2 K^{+} + 2 Zn^{2+} → 2 KZn[Fe(CN)_{6}]^{−} + I_{2}

The precipitation occurs in slightly acidic medium, thus avoids the problem of decomposition of iodide and thiosulfate in strongly acidic medium, and the hexacyanoferrate(III) can be determined by iodometry as usual.

== See also ==
- Iodine–starch test
