= Sealer =

Sealer may refer to:

- A person or ship engaged in seal hunting
- Sealant, a blocking substance, often used in construction
  - Concrete sealers, products applied to concrete to protect it from corrosion
  - Heat sealer, machine using heat to seal products
  - Stone sealer, surface treatment product to retard staining and corrosion in natural stone
- One who seals, in the tradition of sealing (Mormonism)

== See also ==
- Sealer Hill, South Shetland Islands, Antarctica
- Sealers' Oven, bread oven of mud and stone built by sealers around 1800 near Albany, Western Australia
- Sealers Passage, marine channel in the South Shetland Islands, Antarctica
- Sealers' War, conflict in southern New Zealand started by sealers in 1810
- Seal (disambiguation)
- Sealing (disambiguation)
