= Murder of Tristan Brübach =

1998 child murder in Germany

Tristan Brübach
- Born: 3 October 1984; Frankfurt am Main, Hesse, West Germany
- Died: 26 March 1998 (aged 13); Frankfurt am Main, Hesse Germany
- Cause of death: Homicide by slashing
- Occupation: Student
- Known for: Victim of unsolved murder

Tristan Brübach (3 October 1984 – 26 March 1998) was a 13-year-old German boy who was murdered in the Frankfurt suburb of Höchst. His murder remains unsolved.

== Life ==
Tristan Brübach was born on 3 October 1984 in Frankfurt am Main to parents Iris and Bernd. Iris died by suicide in 1995, leaving Bernd to raise Tristan alone. Brübach grew up in Höchst and Unterliederbach, both suburban neighbourhoods on the outer fringes of Frankfurt. He attended Walter Kolb Primary School in Höchst before going to secondary school in Sindlingen, another suburb of Frankfurt.

Tristan was described as shy but very streetwise, spending a lot of his free time walking around his neighbourhood with no specific purpose. He owned a pet rabbit and was extremely fond of animals: despite his shyness in all other scenarios, he would regularly approach strangers of all ages who were walking their dogs, so that he could enter into conversation with them about their pets.

== Murder ==
Brübach had attended school until 1:30 p.m. when he was excused after complaining about back pain. A fellow student confirmed that Brübach entered a line bus bound for Frankfurt-Höchst railway station. Between 2:00 p.m. and 2:20 p.m., a friend of Brübach saw him still riding public transport. The friend, who was seated in a different bus, unsuccessfully attempted to get Brübach's attention, then exited the vehicle at the next stop to walk to Höchst train station on foot, but went home after he did not find him there. A student walking home saw Brübach sitting on a bench by himself at the train station between 2:15 p.m. and 2:25 p.m.

Brübach was last seen alive at Bruno-Asch-Anlage – a park in front of Höchst station – at 3:20 p.m. on the day of his murder. At around 4:00 p.m., the body was discovered by children walking home from school. They returned to the school to tell their teachers, and the police were informed at 5:08 p.m. Brübach's body was in a pedestrian tunnel that runs alongside an underground section of the Liederbach river; the tunnel is known locally as the Liederbach Tunnel.

Brübach had been beaten unconscious and strangled, though the cause of death was a long slash across his neck, deep enough to cut against the spinal cord. Both testicles, as well as flesh from his buttocks and thighs, had been removed. The murder weapon lay on a concrete block nearby. The murder had been seen from a distance by three teenagers (not the same people as the children who discovered Brübach's body); however, they did not realise at the time what they were witnessing. These witnesses gave the police a description of the suspect and a composite sketch was produced.

In March 1999, a year after the murder, Brübach's rucksack was found in a forest in Niedernhausen, 25 kilometres (15 miles) from the crime scene. The rucksack contained a Czech-language road atlas of Germany, which is believed not to have belonged to Brübach, who did not speak Czech and had no reason or means to possess such an item. The police consequently expanded their enquiries to the Czech Republic and Slovakia, but no viable leads emerged.

== Investigation ==
Crime scene reconstruction indicated that Brübach was swiftly ambushed and killed near the river, where his body was left to bleed out. Afterwards, the body was dragged into the tunnel and mutilated. Investigators estimate that the murder and mutilation took less than 15 minutes.

=== Fingerprinting ===
A large-scale fingerprinting operation began in 2002. All males aged between 15 and 45 from Höchst and Unterliederbach, as well as male commuters in that age bracket who used Frankfurt-Höchst railway station (Frankfurt's second busiest) at the time of the murder, have been invited to submit fingerprints samples voluntarily. By 2014, 98.65% of 15-to-45-year-old males from Höchst and 92.95% of those from Unterliederbach had done so.

=== False leads ===
Among other false leads, an American woman told the police that her German ex-husband was the murderer. However, after providing investigators with clues for seven months, she recanted her accusation, admitting that she had made up the story to take revenge on her ex-husband after an acrimonious divorce. The woman was fined for false accusation.

=== Manfred Seel ===
On 19 May 2016, the Hessen State Office of Criminal Investigations (Hessisches Landeskriminalamt) in Wiesbaden announced that Manfred Seel was being looked into as a suspect. Seel died in 2014 aged 67. He lived a seemingly ordinary life, holding the same job for decades, raising a family, having no criminal record and being an active and respected member of his local community, among other things being in a jazz band. However, after his death, his daughter was looking through his belongings in a rented storage facility and found human remains and diaries containing graphic descriptions and sketches of murders. The police are certain that Seel murdered at least five women, and perhaps as many as nine – primarily sex workers, drug addicts and people suffering from mental illnesses – between 1971 and 2004.

Seel was considered a potential suspect primarily because he and Brübach lived in the same area, rather than there being any evidence linking him to Brübach's murder. Brübach does not fit Seel's victim profile in terms of age and gender. However, Seel did exhibit sexual sadism in his presumed murders and kept the genitals of some of his victims. In October 2017, the press officer of the Frankfurt Police announced that Seel had been excluded as a suspect in Brübach's murder.

== Particularities ==
=== Unidentified ponytailed man ===
The prime suspect is a male aged between 20 and 30 with either a cleft lip or a large scar on his upper lip and of a generally unkempt appearance. This man was seen by several people, all of whom contributed to drawing up the composite sketch. The sketch was shared with law enforcement authorities worldwide, but no suspects matching the image have emerged. The first person to see the suspect on the day of the murder was a 12-year-old girl walking through the Liederbach Tunnel, where Brübach would later be murdered. The girl reported that she saw the man at around 3:50 p.m., half an hour after the murder, coming out from behind a bush. He was wearing a hat, with a ponytail visibly dangling from the back of it. About a week later, a man turned up at the offices of a law firm and told a paralegal, "I've only just been released from prison and I've already screwed up." The employee directed the man to another law firm, which dealt with criminal law matters, but the man never went there. A week after this sighting, another witness – who gave Brübach private academic tuition – came forward. She stated that a few days before Brübach's murder, she had seen him in the company of a man who closely resembled the composite sketch. She was sure that she had seen this man more than once in the recent past.

In 2008, two former employees of Justizvollzugsanstalt Höchst claimed that a man matching the composite sketch had served a prison sentence at the facility. Investigator Uwe Fey researched many of the inmate dossiers, but only had access to those who had already been released. Fey sent requests for prisoner files to all roughly 400 prisons and correctional facilities in Germany, but less than 80 sent back responses.

The woman believed to have been the last person to see Brübach alive, at Bruno-Asch-Anlage, provided a description that differed from that of the ponytailed man. According to this witness, she was sitting on a park bench when Brübach, who was alone, sat down on the same bench and smoked a cigarette. The witness briefly engaged in small talk with Brübach before leaving the bench. After she had left, she turned around and saw two men sit down on the bench – one to Brübach's left and one to his right. Brübach was murdered between 10 and 25 minutes later, 500 metres away in the Liederbach Tunnel.

=== Unknown caller ===
On 7 April 1998, the day after Brübach's funeral, a man called the police to report that he was the murderer. He reported that he was at Höchst railway station and would wait there for the police to come and arrest him. The caller described himself to the officer as 180 cm with long black hair. When the police arrived, he was nowhere to be found. Parts of the call were made public and can be heard on YouTube. The caller has never been identified.

=== Grave ===
In October 1999, an unknown person entered Höchst Cemetery at night and dug 1.2 metres into the ground, down to Brübach's coffin. The coffin was not opened. The police believe that the act was committed by a mentally disturbed person with no connection to Brübach or his murder. Under German law, graves in public cemeteries are maintained by the state for a certain period of time (20 years in Hessen, the state where Brübach lived), after which the deceased person's family must pay to lease the grave site if they wish to keep their loved one there. If the family does not pay, the headstone is removed and the grave is reused for a new deceased person. Brübach's father died aged 59 in 2015 and no other relatives could afford to pay the fees to keep Brübach's grave in place, so a public initiative was launched to fund a memorial stone. In March 2018, after Brübach's grave was reused, a memorial stone was erected under a nearby tree, within sight of the grave.

=== Rewards offered ===
The Frankfurt am Main Prosecutor's Office is offering 15,000 euros for any information leading to conviction of Brübach's murderer. A private individual has added 5,000 euros to this, making the total reward sum 20,000 euros. Another private individual offered a time-limited 80,000-euro reward, but it expired in May 2016 with no one coming forward. The 20,000-euro reward remains in place.

== See also ==
- List of unsolved murders
