= Sealing =

Sealing may refer to:

== Processes ==
- Seal (emblem), applying a seal to a document for authentication
- Sealing wax, a wax material of a seal which, after melting, hardens quickly
- Duct sealing, the sealing of leaks in air ducts
- Induction sealing, method of heating a metal disk to seal a cap or top on a container
- Porosity sealing, the process of filling a porous substrate to make it airtight
- Record sealing, the practice of making court records confidential
- Stone sealing, the application of a surface treatment to products constructed of natural stone
- Sealing compound, sealant, used to block the passage of fluids
- Searing meat (and other foods), commonly but erroneously referred to as 'sealing in the juices' etc.

== Religion ==
- Sealing (Mormonism), a ritual intended to make family relationships permanent even after death
- Sealing power, in Mormonism
- Sealing room, an ordinance room

== Other ==
- Sealing the Tomb, altarpiece triptych by William Hogarth in the English city of Bristol
- Seal hunting, personal or commercial hunting of seals

== See also ==
- Seal (disambiguation)
- Seale (disambiguation)
- Sealer (disambiguation)
- Seals (disambiguation)
