= Thoelke =

Thoelke is a surname. Notable people with the surname include:

- Bjarne Thoelke (born 1992), German footballer
- Wim Thoelke (1927–1995), German television presenter
