= Navy SEALs (disambiguation) =

The Navy SEALs are the U.S. Navy's primary special operations force.

Navy SEALs may also refer to:

- Naval Special Warfare Command (Thailand)
- Navy SEALs (film), a 1990 American military action film
  - Navy SEALs (video game), a 1990 video game based on the 1990 film
- Navy Seals vs. Zombies, a 2015 American action horror film
- Underwater Demolition Assault Unit, a Thai special operations force unit colloquially known as the Royal Thai Navy Seals
- United States Navy Marine Mammal Program, a research program that investigates military use of sea lions

== See also ==
- SEAL (disambiguation)
- Seals (disambiguation)
