= Seals (surname) =

Seals is an English surname, a variant of the surname Seal.

== List of people with surname Seals ==
- Baby Franklin Seals (c.1880–1915), American vaudeville performer and songwriter
- Brady Seals (born 1969), American country music artist
- Bruce Seals (1953–2020), American basketball player
- Carl H. Seals (1883–1955), United States Army officer and prisoner of war
- Catherine Seals (c.1874–1930), American religious leader and faith healer
- Dan Seals (1948–2009), American musician
- Dan Seals (politician) (born 1971), American politician
- Darren Seals (1987–2016), American activist from Ferguson, Missouri
- David Seals (1947–2017), American poet
- George Seals (1942–2022), American football player
- Jay Seals (born 1976), American actor
- Jim Seals (1942–2022), American musician, of the duo Seals and Crofts
- Ken Seals, American college football quarterback
- Leon Seals (born 1964), American football player
- Melvin Seals (born 1953), American musician, with rock band JGB
- Ray Seals (1965–2025), American football player
- Richard Seals (born 1976), American professional football player
- Ricky Seals-Jones (born 1995), American football player
- Shea Seals (born 1975), American basketball player
- Son Seals (1942–2004), American blues guitarist and singer
- Sugar Ray Seales (born 1952), American boxer
- Tré Seals (born 1993), American type designer
- Troy Seals (1938–2025), American singer, songwriter, and guitarist
- Venetta Seals, American politician and businesswoman, Mayor of Pecos, Texas
- Warren Seals (born 1992), South African rugby union player
- Woodrow Bradley Seals (1917–1990), United States District Judge in Texas

== See also ==
- Seals (disambiguation)
- Seales
