= SEAL (disambiguation) =

SEAL may refer to:

- "Sea/Air/Land" and analogous military tactical teams:
  - United States Navy SEALs
  - The Thailand Navy SEALs, an Underwater Demolition Assault Unit
- Other "SEAL" acronyms:
  - SEAL (cipher), a cryptographic algorithm
  - Sea Scout Experience Advanced Leadership (SEAL) training
  - Social and Emotional Aspects of Learning, a UK program re education
  - Select Entry Accelerated Learning, a program used in Victoria, Australia, in some secondary schools
  - SEAL Awards, environmental awards honoring Sustainability, Environmental Achievement, and Leadership
- Southeast Asian Linguistics Society (SEALS)

== See also ==
- Seal (disambiguation)
- Seals (disambiguation)
- Navy SEALs (disambiguation)
