= Seel =

Seel may refer to:

== People ==
- Adolf Seel (1829–1907), German painter
- Cache Seel, the deck boss and only survivor of the FV Big Valley, which sank on January 15, 2005
- Charles Seel (1897–1980), American actor
- Daniela Seel (born 1974), German poet, translator, editor and publisher
- Karen Seel, commissioner in District 5, Pinellas County, FL
- Manfred Seel (1946–2014), German suspected serial killer
- Pierre Seel (1923–2005), only French person to have testified openly about his experience of deportation during World War II due to his homosexuality
- Steve Seel (born 1966), American disc jockey for 89.3 The Current in the Twin Cities, Minnesota
- Wolfgang Seel (born 1948), German footballer

== Places ==
- Seel Park, the home ground of the English football club Mossley A.F.C.
- Keet Seel, a cliff dwelling in the Navajo National Monument
  - 10039 Keet Seel (1Butv 984 LK), a main-belt asteroid named after the cliff dwelling

== Other uses ==
- Seel (Pokémon), a fictional species of Pokémon
- Seeling, a falconry training technique in which a bird was temporarily blinded by sewing its eyes shut; see Medieval hunting

== See also ==
- Seal (disambiguation)
