= CEMP =

CEMP may refer to:

- Central–Eastern Malayo-Polynesian languages
- Convention on the Conservation of Antarctic Marine Living Resources Ecosystem Monitoring Programme
- CEMP star
