= Liederbach =

Liederbach may refer to:

- Liederbach am Taunus, a town in Hesse, Germany
- Liederbach (Main), a river of Hesse, Germany, tributary of the Main

== See also ==
- Unterliederbach, a city district of Frankfurt am Main, Germany
