= The Seventh Seal (disambiguation) =

The Seventh Seal is a 1957 Swedish historical fantasy film written and directed by Ingmar Bergman.

The Seventh Seal may also refer to:

- The seventh seal, a concept in Christian eschatology
- The Seventh Seal (Morgana Lefay album), 1999
- The Seventh Seal (Rakim album), 2009
- The Seventh Seal (Kutless album), 2025 EP
- "The Seventh Seal", from Scott Walker's 1969 album Scott 4
- "The Seventh Seal", Op. 50 (1972) by W. Francis McBeth
- "The Seventh Seal", from Van Halen's 1995 album Balance
- "The Seventh Seal", from Groundation's 2004 album We Free Again

== See also ==
- Seven seals (disambiguation)
