= Seven seals (disambiguation) =

The seven seals are seven symbolic seals mentioned in the Book of Revelation whose opening is said to signal the end of the world.

Seven seals may also refer to:

- Seven Seals (album), a 2005 album by German power metal band Primal Fear

== See also ==
- The Seventh Seal (disambiguation)
- De septem sigillis (On the Seven Seals), list of works with this title
