= Convention on the Conservation of Antarctic Marine Living Resources =

1980 environmental treaty

Commission for the Conservation of Antarctic Marine Living Resources
- Logo of the Commission for the Conservation of Antarctic Marine Living Resources
- Abbreviation: CCAMLR
- Formation: 20 May 1980 (46 years ago)
- Type: International organization
- Purpose: Environment
- Headquarters: Hobart, Australia
- Coordinates: 42.8866992°S 147.3243362°E
- Region served: Antarctic
- Members: 27 Members + 10 Acceding States
- Executive Secretary: Dr David Agnew
- Website: www.ccamlr.org

The Convention on the Conservation of Antarctic Marine Living Resources, also known as the CAMLR Convention, is part of the Antarctic Treaty System.

The Convention was opened for signature on 1 August 1980 and entered into force on 7 April 1982 by the Commission for the Conservation of Antarctic Marine Living Resources (CCAMLR), headquartered in Tasmania, Australia. The goal is to preserve marine life and environmental integrity in and near Antarctica.

It was established in large part to concerns that an increase in krill catches in the Southern Ocean could have a serious impact on populations of other marine life which are dependent upon krill for food.

In 1989, CCAMLR set up the Ecosystem Monitoring Program (CEMP) to further monitor the effects of fishing and harvesting of species in the area.

On 19 October 2022, Ecuador became a New Member of the Commission, the 26th member state of the CCAMLR.

== Member states ==
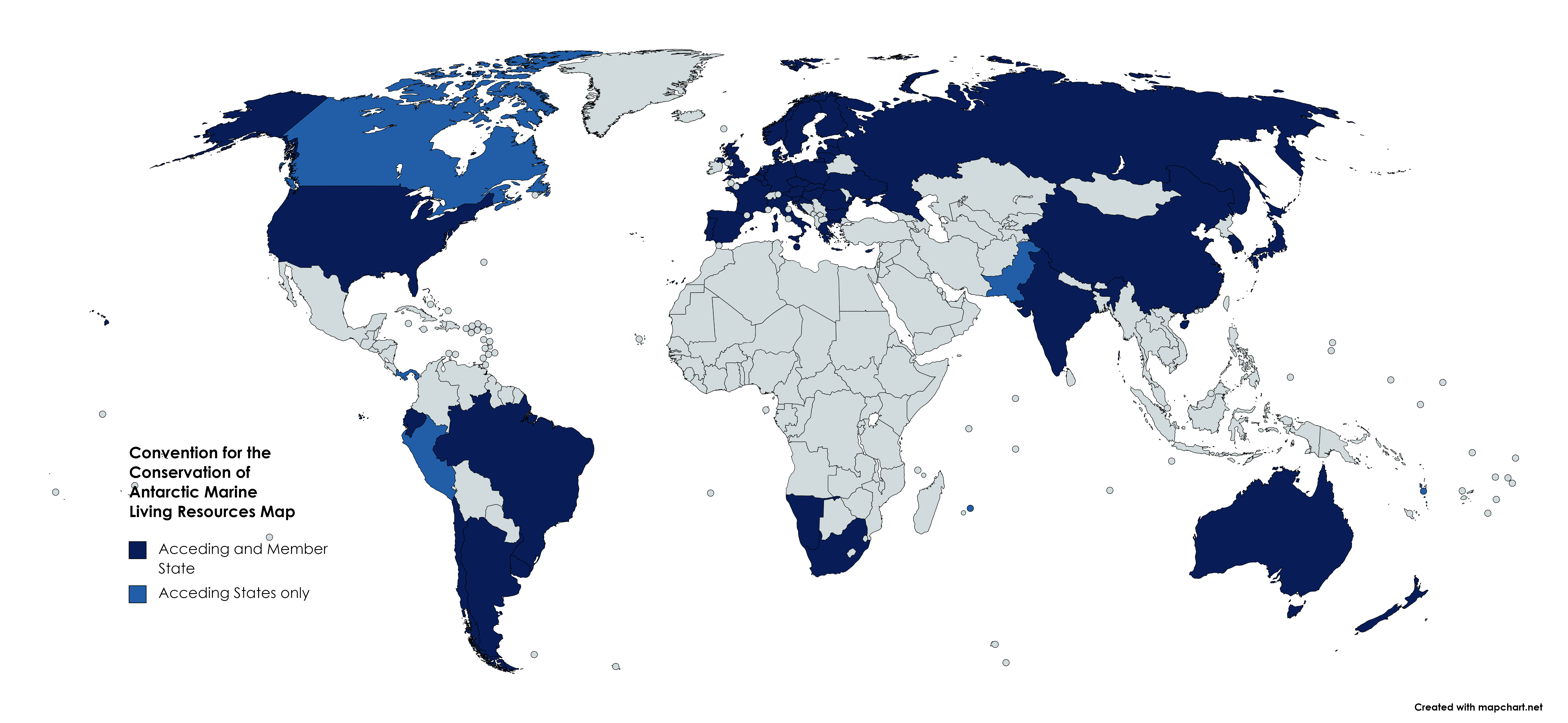
Convention on the Conservation of Antarctic Marine Living Resources Map

Acceding and Member State	Acceding States only
Argentina	Bulgaria
Australia	Canada
Belgium	Cook Islands
Brazil	Finland
Chile	Greece
China	Mauritius
Ecuador	Pakistan
European Union	Panama
France	Peru
Germany	Vanuatu
India	
Italy	
Japan	
South Korea	
Namibia	
Netherlands	
New Zealand	
Norway	
Poland	
Russia	
South Africa	
Spain	
Sweden	
Ukraine	
United Kingdom	
United States	
Uruguay	

== Marine Protected Areas (MPAs) ==
In 2009, the Commission agreed by consensus to creating a representative network of MPAs by 2012. It was the first international body to do this based on recommendations from the United Nations World Summit on Sustainable Development. In 2011, it identified nine planning domains within which to designate these protected areas.

Marine Protected Area	Size	Status	Proposed	Proposed by	Designated
South Orkneys	94,000 km2	Designated		United Kingdom	2009
Ross Sea	1,550,000 km2	Designated	2012	New Zealand, United States	2016
East Antarctica	950,000 km2	Proposal	2010	Australia, France, European Union	N/A
Weddell Sea	1,800,000 km2	Proposal	2016	Germany, European Union	N/A
Antarctic Peninsula	450,000 km2	Proposal	2018	Argentina, Chile	N/A

=== South Orkneys MPA ===
In 2009, the Commission agreed by consensus to establish the world's first high-seas MPA to protect ocean surrounding the South Orkney Islands in the south Atlantic Ocean.

It was proposed by the United Kingdom and covers 94,000 km2. It came into force in May 2010.

=== Ross Sea MPA ===
In 2010, a proposal for an MPA in the Ross Sea were put forward by both the US and New Zealand. These were later combined as a joint proposal.

In July 2013, the Commission held a special meeting in Bremerhaven to consider proposals for MPAs in both the Ross Sea and East Antarctica. Consensus was not reached after Russia voted against the proposals, citing uncertainty about whether the commission had the authority to establish a protected area.

On 28 October 2016, after several years of scientific and diplomatic discussions, the Commission agreed by consensus to designate the Ross Sea marine protected area at its annual meeting in Hobart. The protected area covers 1.55 million square kilometres of ocean, of which 72% is a no-take zone. The remaining 28% include some harvesting of fish and krill for the purpose of scientific research.

The Ross Sea MPA will be in force for 35 years. At the end of its review period in 2052, CCAMLR Members must agree by consensus to renew or modify it as needed.

=== East Antarctic MPA ===
In 2010, Australia, France and the European Union submitted a proposal for an MPA in East Antarctica. It originally included seven representative areas with varying degrees of protection and covered 1.8 million square kilometres of ocean. By 2017, these were scaled back to three areas covering just under 1 million square kilometres. This was due to the political concerns and economic interests expressed by some Member states. The proposal was also amended to include an expiration of 30 years after designation and the ability to review its monitoring and management every ten years. It has been under consideration by the Commission since 2012.
