= St. Martha, Engenhahn =

Church in Niedernhausen, Germany

Coordinates: 50.17290421248702°N 8.247712254524231°E

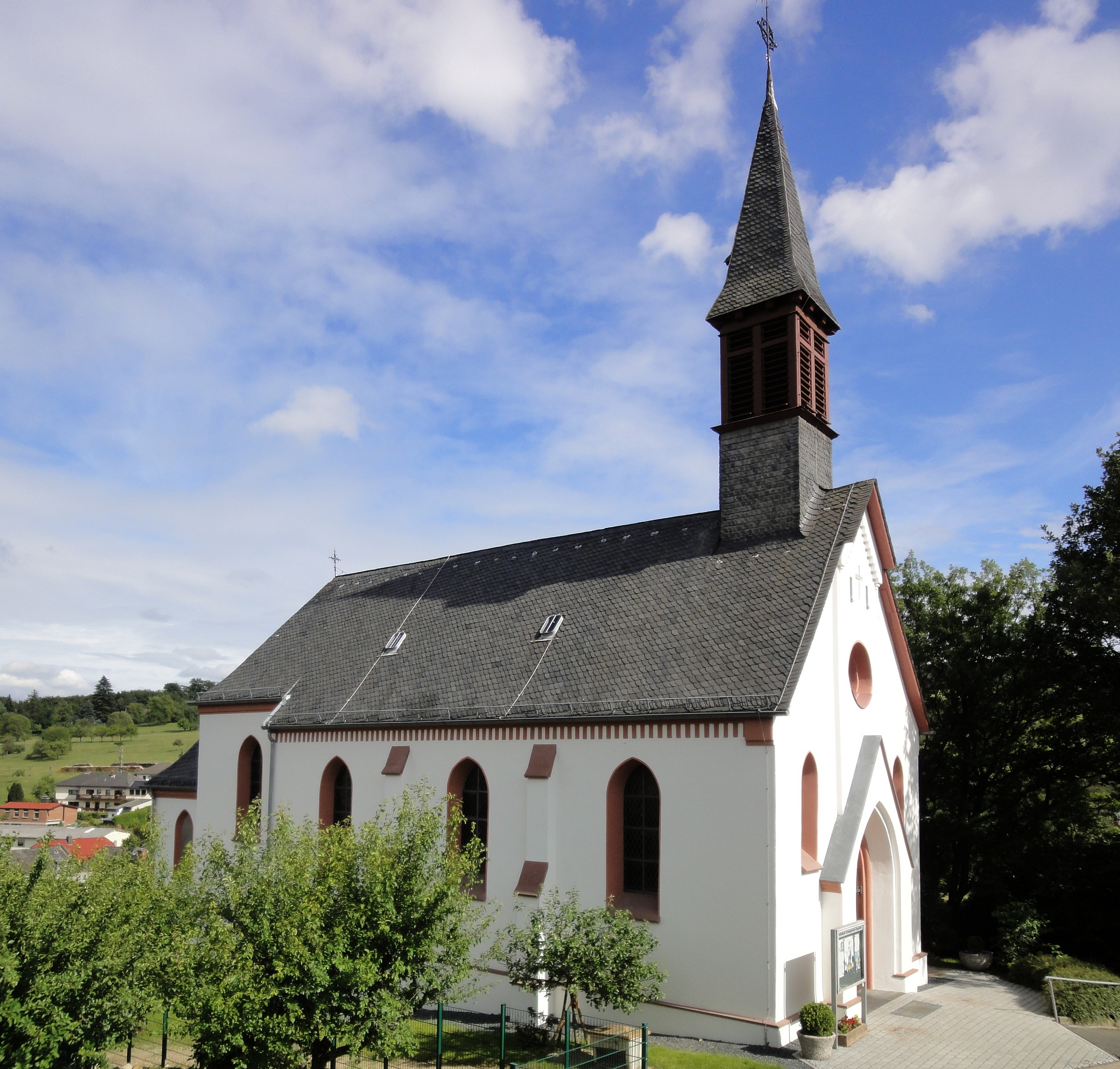
St. Martha

St. Martha is a Catholic church in Engenhahn, now an Ortsteil of Niedernhausen, Hesse, Germany. It was built in 1890/91 in the west of the village, designed by Alois Vogt, who taught at the Bauschule in Idstein. It was built on an initiative of the Idstein priest Schilo, who collected donations to build a church in both Idstein and Engenhahn.

The church served as a chapel until 1924. In 1963, a parish of the same name was installed, but it was merged to St. Martin, Idstein, in 2017.
