= Seal =

Seal may refer to:

== Common uses ==
- Pinniped, a diverse group of semi-aquatic mammals, many of which are commonly called seals, particularly:
  - Earless seal, also called "true seal"
  - Eared seal
    - Fur seal
- Seal (emblem), a device to impress an emblem, used as a means of authentication, on paper, wax, clay or another medium (the impression is also called a seal)
- Seal (mechanical), a device which helps prevent leakage, contain pressure, or exclude contamination where two systems join
  - Hermetic seal, an airtight mechanical seal
- Security seals such as labels, tapes, bands, or ties affixed onto a container in order to prevent and detect tampering

== Arts, entertainment and media ==
- Seal (1991 album), by Seal
- Seal (1994 album), sometimes referred to as Seal II, by Seal
- Seal IV, a 2003 album by Seal
- Seal Online, a 2003 massively multiplayer online role-playing game

== Law ==
- Seal (contract law), a legal formality for contracts and other instruments
- Seal (East Asia), a stamp used in East Asia as a form of a signature
- Record sealing

== Military ==
=== Special forces ===
- United States Navy SEALs, the principal special operations force of the U.S. Navy
- Thai Navy Seals, Thai Navy special operations force modelled on the U.S. Navy SEALs
- Naval Special Operations Command, also known as the Philippine Navy SEALs
- ROKN UDT/SEALs, a component of the Republic of Korea Navy Special Warfare Flotilla

=== Other uses in military ===
- Fairey Seal, a 1930s British carrier-borne torpedo bomber aircraft
- HMS Seal, two Royal Navy ships and one submarine
- USS Seal, two American submarines
- Supermarine Seal II, the 1921 British flying boat

== People ==
- Seal (musician) (born 1963), English singer and songwriter
- Seal (surname), including a list of people with the surname

== Places ==
- Seal, Kent, a village and civil parish in England
- Seal, Ohio, an unincorporated community
- Seal Beach, California, a city in Orange County, US
- Seal Cay, an island within the Bahamas
- Seal Harbour, Nova Scotia, a community in Guysborough County, Canada
- Seal Lake, a lake in Greenland

== Other uses ==
- "Seal", a generic term for the surface treatment of sealed roads (and by extension, a term used for the roads themselves)
- Sealing (Mormonism), a religious ordinance
- Seal brown
- Seal of the prophets, a title given to the Islamic prophet, Muhammad
- Seal script, ancient Chinese calligraphy
- BYD Seal, an electric sedan
- Select Entry Accelerated Learning, a program used in Victoria, Australia, in some secondary schools
- sealed, a keyword in Java and C# for constraining inheritance of classes and interfaces (Java also has a keyword non-sealed)

== See also ==
- SEAL (disambiguation)
- Seale (disambiguation)
- Sealing (disambiguation)
- Seals (disambiguation)
- Seel (disambiguation)
