= Manfred Seel =

Suspected German serial killer

- Born: Manfred Adolf Seel; 30 October 1946; Königstein im Taunus, Greater Hesse, Germany
- Died: 26 August 2014 (aged 67); Schwalbach am Taunus, Hesse, Germany
- Other names: The Hesse Ripper; Jack the Ripper of Schwalbach; Alaska
- Conviction: Died before he could be arrested

Details
- Victims: 5–10+
- Span of crimes: 1971–2004
- Country: Germany
- Date apprehended: Never apprehended

Manfred Adolf Seel (30 October 1946 – 26 August 2014), also known as the Hesse Ripper, Jack the Ripper of Schwalbach and Alaska, was a German suspected serial killer believed to have committed at least five murders in the Frankfurt Rhine-Main region between 1971 and 2004, and is currently under investigation for other unresolved deaths. Seel died of esophageal cancer before his alleged crimes were uncovered.

== Life ==
Manfred Seel was born on 30 October 1946 and grew up as an only child in Kronberg im Taunus, Hesse, West Germany. After attending secondary school in Oberursel in 1957, Seel completed an apprenticeship for chemography in the Georg Stritt printing company on Mainzer Landstraße in Frankfurt. Between 1967 and 1969 he began his two years of compulsory military service, serving in the Raketenartilleriebatallion 52 at the Steuben kaserne in Giessen. In 1973, after receiving his abitur, Seel studied art and social history at the Goethe University Frankfurt but did not graduate. Seel married in 1973; his wife died in 2013. His only child, a daughter, was born in 1979.

Seel was described by neighbours as a friendly and inconspicuous man who occasionally had angry outbursts. According to eyewitness testimony, he regularly visited local prostitutes in the early 1990s. One prostitute contacted a helpline for local sex workers and reported being abused by Seel, warning other women about his violent behaviour. In 1996, Seel checked into a rehab clinic in Erbach im Odenwald to treat alcoholism.

Seel died in 2014, one year after he was diagnosed with esophageal cancer. A few weeks after his death, Seel's daughter and her partner discovered human remains in a rented garage near his residence. As of September 2015, the LKA Working Group Alaska had cited Seel as a prime suspect in several murders which are currently being investigated. Alaska was a nickname of Seel, as he was known to often wear fur clothing in warm seasons and because Alaska was one of his preferred travel destinations. Seel was previously considered a "blameless citizen". The investigation led into Frankfurt's red-light district and several cold cases concerning the murders of prostitutes.

== Murders ==
The murders attributed to Seel were brutal and exhibited sexual sadism. The victims were killed by "harsh violence in sexually relevant zones". The killer would gather certain organs or body parts such as genitals, arms or legs, which he later kept in hidden places as trophies. He also probably returned to the crime scenes for sexual gratification.

The victims always had different parts removed. Investigator Frank Hermann said at a press conference: "Sometimes it's a right leg, sometimes a left arm – if you put it together, you could actually make a new body by doing that". The police acknowledge that Seel may have had an accomplice, citing forensic trace evidence and the extreme injury pattern on a corpse which only could have been possible by the interaction of two perpetrators. The State Office of Criminal Investigation is currently appealing to the public for further information about Seel and his victims. Also, they are looking for any surviving victims, with the help of whom conclusions could be drawn for the perpetrator, his motive or the course of events.

Yes, this is definitely the most extraordinary case I've ever worked on. The violence is so despicable and unfathomable, it eclipses everything else I've experienced.

— Detective Chief Superintendent Holger Thomsen, "Alaska" special commission

The police saw Seel as a misogynist or a misanthrope. On the hard drives of several PCs in his basement, investigators found five terabytes of violent pornography, in both photo and video format. According to criminal psychologist Lydia Benecke, Seel saw his victims as objects for the satisfaction of his sadistic fantasies and low self-esteem. The humiliation, dehumanization and control over the victims, along with a greatly diminished sense of empathy, probably played a major role in the murders. The "trophy hunting" and the storage of body parts may have served another desire as well.

According to the criminal psychologist Helmut Kury, Seel felt "lust for violence and aggression" and most likely lacked "emotional vibration ability". He assumes that the "social aide" of his personality and the construction of a bourgeois facade served to conceal his perverse inclinations. The offender was capable of acting intelligently. He had not acted spontaneously and in the effect, but his deeds (selection of the victims and the course of action) were planned. The cause of his sadistic tendencies could have been early childhood developments. Seel's killing instinct, according to the investigators, probably expired between 1971 and 1991, as he had been in a psychologically stable phase due to changing circumstances such as marriage and family formation.

== Victims ==
The police assume that between 1971 and 2004, Seel murdered at least five women. He mostly targeted drug-addicted sex workers from the street, who are classified as a high-risk group because they can be easily addressed and their disappearance is usually not noticed immediately. The murders show large behavioural matches, including a recognizable "signature" of the perpetrator. The commonality of the ritualistic murder series was that all victims were killed by strangulation. In addition, the victims' breasts and pubic areas were defaced, and all body parts or organs were removed. Seel is associated with the unsolved murders of the following women:

- Gudrun Ebel, 19, a cleaner and geriatric care assistant, may have been Seel's first victim. Her body was discovered on 6 February 1971, in a garden shed in Bad Vilbel. According to the investigators, the killer displayed sadistic behaviour, and had opened her lower abdomen with a knife, removing her uterus. Authorities assume that the killer lured her into a gazebo and murdered her there.
- In April 1971, Hatice Erülkeroglu, 23, a Turkish geriatric nurse, may have had a connection between Seel, as he was trained at, and later worked in, the immediate vicinity of the Johanna Kirchner retirement home in Frankfurt. The killer and the victim could possibly have been in an adjacent "party venue", a disused railway carriage on a former brownfield site, which often served as a meeting place for young lovers. The victim, who was attacked on the Camberger Bridge, suffered massive injuries to her head and the genital area had been mutilated, suggesting that the killer had a sexually sadistic personality structure.
- Gisela Singh, 36, was a heroin-addicted and HIV positive sex worker, whose body was discovered by mushroom pickers fourteen days after her disappearance under brushwood in a parking lot in the Hofheim forest. Singh was working on the bar in Frankfurt-Kaiserstrasse. She was last seen on 14 June 1991, at Café Fix (a drug counselling centre on Frankfurt's Moselstrasse). Shortly before, she had undergone medical treatment for advanced HIV. In her handbag, a ticket for the E3414 express train from Karlsruhe to Heidelberg was found in addition to a small tube and a disposable syringe, which had been stamped the same day. Investigators sought a middle-aged suitor named "Hans", who was driving a blue Opel Rekord with a Darmstadt licence plate. Later, it was pointed out that Seel had been one of Singh's suitors. Singh had been strangled and her abdomen and thighs were mutilated. At the time of the discovery, the body was already badly decayed and the head partially skeletonized.
- Dominique Monrose, 32, a drug-addicted, homeless sex worker from Martinique was last seen alive on 3 December 1993. The police assume that she had been killed that same day. Her torso was found in a garbage bag on Friedberger Landstraße. The culprit had severed her head with a knife. Her various body parts were found stored in plastic bags at various points on the so-called Offenbacher Kreuz on the Bundesautobahn 661. It is assumed that the killer had kept her torso in a freezer for about ten days, to be able to deal with it for longer. Monrose was known to have interfered with the scene by undercutting the usual market prices. She had undergone a methadone program and lived with a former suitor who reported her disappearance.
- The severed head of Pia Isabel Heym, 27, a mentally ill bank employee who was reported missing since July 1996, was found in a small garden in Sachsenhausen. According to the police, Heym took tablets for the treatment of schizophrenic features. She may have been a victim of Seel.
- Julie Anna Schröder, 18, was a drug-addicted sex worker who disappeared on 13 July 1998, from the Frankfurt station district.
- Gabriele de Haas, 32, was a drug-addicted sex worker who disappeared on 7 September 1999. It is alleged that the culprit had chatted with her in a forum. The police assume that it was a homicide, and her body has not been found.
- Christine Goldhagen was a woman who went missing from Essen, Germany, on 4 December 2000. She left her mother's apartment on the afternoon of the day she disappeared, and has not been seen since. Like other missing prostitutes, she worked in Frankfurt's Bahnhofsviertel.
- On 4 April 2004, the skeletonized head of a woman wrapped in aluminium foil was found in the dam in Offenbach. No other remains were recovered and the cause of death is unknown. Although her face was reconstructed with the help of forensics, her identity remains unknown. The decedent remains known as the Frankfurt Jane Doe.
- According to testimonies, Seel had apparently carried out a housing settlement for 43-year-old Britta Simone Diallo. The sex worker, who had no fixed abode and was last seen alive in the autumn of 2003 and not reported missing, had been tortured before her death. Remains of her body (feet and thighs in a state of extreme decay) had been hidden in a blue plastic bin by Seel in his garage in Schwalbacher Nordstrasse. The body parts were found on 10 September 2014, by Seel's daughter, which led the authorities to posthumously point at Seel as the prime suspect. The injuries suffered by Diallo were very much in line with the pictures found on Seel's computer, and it is believed that a manga comic owned by Seel may have been used as a template. It can not be ruled out with certainty that Diallo was still alive when Seel severed her arms and legs with a handsaw. In the area of the knees, pelvis, breasts and in the vaginal area eight nails were found. In addition, the body had several stab wounds and cuts. LKA chief Sabine Thurau called this act "the peak of Seel's sexual preferences". Due to the cruel accompanying circumstances, the investigator Frank Hermann effectively excluded this as a single act and had his team of DNA analysts, profilers and specialists systematically investigate further victims.

=== Footnotes ===
At the time, Seel's participation in the murder of Tristan Brübach was not excluded. The 13-year-old student was killed in 1998 in an underpass of the Liederbach Canal near Höchst by an unknown person. Since the murder was committed in the vicinity of the Höchst station, in a relatively busy area, the perpetrator had to act very quickly and functionally. The police considered based on a similar modus operandi (paralleled the Singh murder case: the shoes of the killed were arranged in a specific pattern in pairs next to the body). A dactyloscopic analysis of fingerprints on the victim's exercise book was negative. In October 2017, the head of the press office of the Frankfurt police said that Seel had been excluded as a suspect. The public search for Tristan's murderer will be resumed "soon".

== Investigation status ==
With no evidence of fingerprints on his clarinet, the 2017 investigation focused on, among other things, potential corpse deposits and DNA testing on garments worn by the victim. Since these are old cases, with correspondingly poor quality of the evidence, the analysis will probably last even longer in order to rule out any traces of deception. Also, it is still to be determined if there is a second offender. This hypothesis could neither be verified nor ruled out. The police exclude a possible victim circle, the exact number is not known, and outside the Rhine-Main area according to current knowledge largely from. So far no concrete results have been achieved. For the deeds of Seel, so far there are only indictments. The latest findings (as of December 2017) of the investigation state that Seel as probably active only in the Rhine-Main area and that there were no comparable cases in the Federal Republic and in Europe during this period. The special commission and working was meanwhile dissolved, and only the homicide commission can determine anything further.

== Media ==
The true crime thriller Wolfswut, written by German bestselling author Andreas Gößling, which plays in Berlin instead of Frankfurt, is based on Seel's crimes. The well-known German author Nele Neuhaus has also announced that she was inspired by the crimes of the "Hesse Ripper" Manfred Seel in one of her Taunus thrillers, which will be published in November 2018.

== See also ==
- List of German serial killers
