= Seales =

Seales is an English language surname. People with this surname include:

- Amanda Seales (born 1981), American actress
- Franklyn Seales (1952–1990), American actor
- Jalarnie Seales (born 1997), West Indian cricketer
- Jayden Seales (born 2001), Trinidadian cricketer
- Jim Seales, lead guitar in Shenandoah (band)
- Joe Seales, founder of the Right Side Broadcasting Network, and his brother Jacob Seales, composer of "The American Dreamer"
- Lecretia Seales (1973–2015), New Zealand lawyer and physician-assisted dying activist
- Marc Seales (born 1954), American jazz pianist
- Maxwell Seales (born 1972), Saint Lucia athlete
- Sugar Ray Seales (born 1952), American boxer

== See also ==
- Seale (disambiguation)
- Searles (surname)
