= Seal Islands (South Shetland Islands) =

Islands of Antarctica

- Location of Elephant Island in the South Shetland Islands

- Location within Antarctic Peninsula Location within Antarctica

Geography
- Location: Antarctica
- Coordinates: 60°58′S 55°24′W
- Archipelago: South Shetland Islands

Administration
- Administered under the Antarctic Treaty System

Demographics
- Population: uninhabited

Additional information
- CEMP Site No.1.

The Seal Islands (also known as Îles des Phoques, Islas Foca, Islotes Foca and Seal Rocks) are a group of small islands and rocky islets lying about 7 km north and north-west of Elephant Island, in the South Shetland Islands of Antarctica. They extend east–west for about 5 km, and are separated from Elephant Island by Sealers Passage. The group takes its name from the largest island, which Captain William Smith named Seal Island in 1820 because of the number of seals killed there.

== Description ==
Seal Island, the largest in the group, has a coastline of precipitous cliffs, with a sandy beach on the western shore and some small coves. It rises to 125 m in height. It is constituted of poorly consolidated sedimentary rocks which are susceptible to wave and runoff erosion. Other islands in the group are also rocky with steep cliffs and few beaches. Ice-cover is seasonal.

== Important Bird Area ==
The islands, with the intervening marine zone, have been identified as a 514 ha Important Bird Area (IBA) by BirdLife International because they support several breeding colonies, totalling some 20,000 pairs, of chinstrap penguins. Other birds nesting in the group in smaller numbers include macaroni penguins (350 pairs), southern giant petrels, imperial shags, Cape petrels, Wilson's storm petrels, snowy sheathbills and kelp gulls. Antarctic fur seals breed on the islands, with around 600 seal pups born each year. Southern elephant, Weddell, leopard and crabeater seals haul out there.

== See also ==
- List of Antarctic and subantarctic islands
