= Niedernhausen =

- Municipality
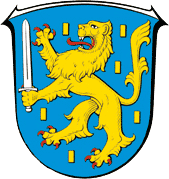
- Coat of arms

- Location of Niedernhausen within Rheingau-Taunus-Kreis district
- Interactive map of Niedernhausen
- Location within Germany Location within Hesse
- Coordinates: 50°10′N 8°19′E
- Country: Germany
- State: Hesse
- Admin. region: Darmstadt
- District: Rheingau-Taunus-Kreis

Government
  - Mayor (2024-current): Lucie Maier-Frutig

Area
  - Total: 35.25 km^{2} (13.61 sq mi)
- Elevation: 254–592 m (833–1,942 ft)

Population (2025-12-31)
  - Total: 14,216
  - Density: 403.3/km^{2} (1,045/sq mi)
- Time zone: UTC+01:00 (CET)
  - Summer (DST): UTC+02:00 (CEST)
- Postal codes: 65527
- Dialling codes: 06127
- Vehicle registration: RÜD
- Website: www.niedernhausen.de

Niedernhausen im Taunus is a municipality in the Rheingau-Taunus-Kreis in the Regierungsbezirk of Darmstadt in Hesse, Germany, with almost 15,000 inhabitants.

== Geography ==
=== Location ===
Niedernhausen lies in the Rhein-Taunus Nature Park in the west of the Frankfurt Rhine Main Region north of Wiesbaden. The main centre of Niedernhausen (which alone is home to more than half the community's inhabitants) and the outlying centre of Königshofen stretch along the slopes of a dale. The heart of the community is found in the bottom of the dale. The community is surrounded by mixed forest covering 60% of the municipal area.

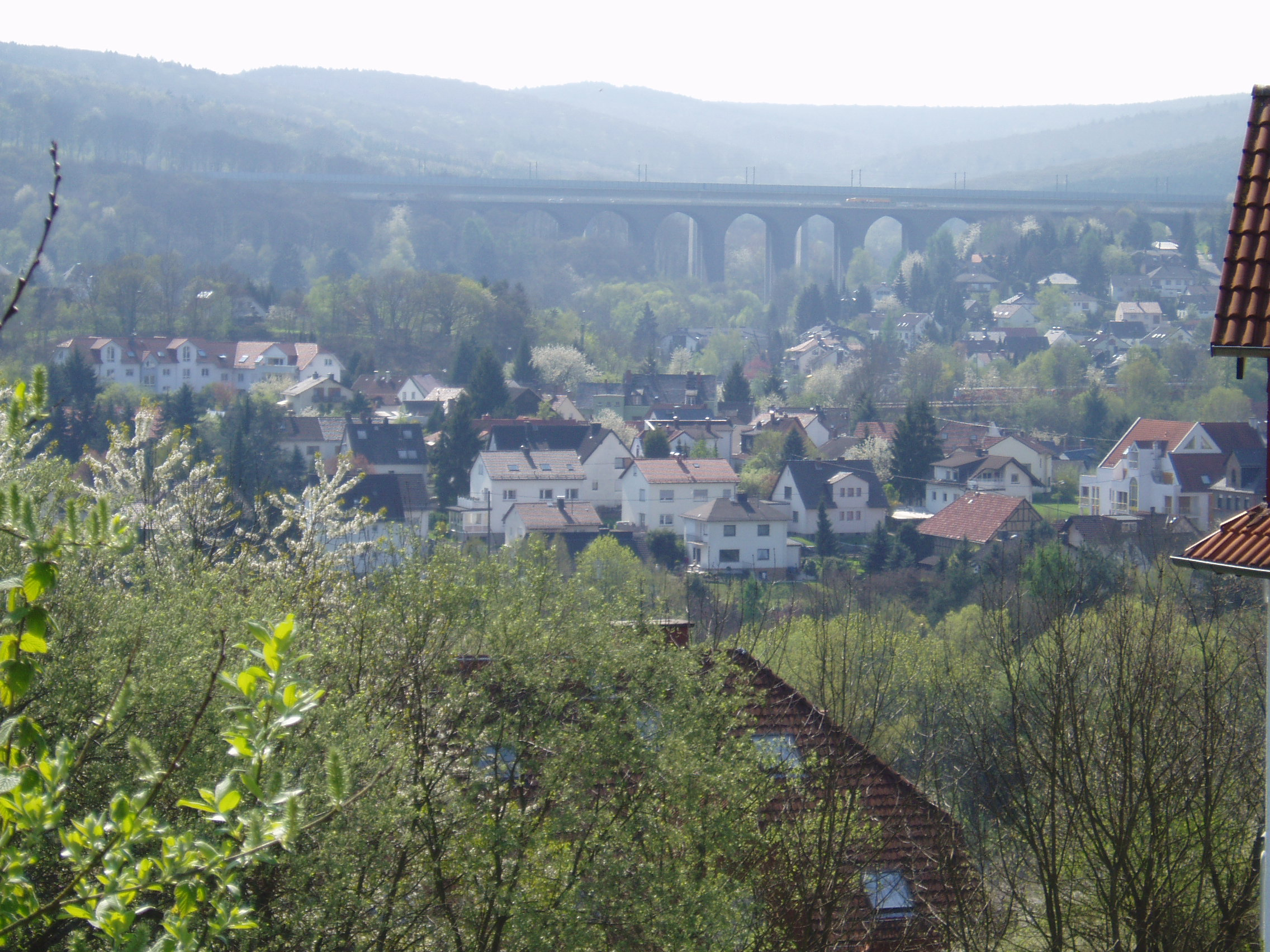
View over Niedernhausen with the Theiß valley bridge

Niedernhausen lies on the south flank of the Taunus low mountain range, a fold range that stretches from the Niederwald ("Lower Forest") near Rüdesheim am Rhein towards the northeast, on into the Wetterau near Bad Nauheim. This range is subdivided by two gaps, namely the Idstein Basin and the Saalburg Basin, into three parts: the Rheingau-Taunus, the High Taunus and the Wetterau-Taunus. The outliers of the Idstein Basin reach as far as Niedernhausen in the form of the Autal, putting the community right on the east–west dividing line between the Rheingau-Taunus and the High Taunus.

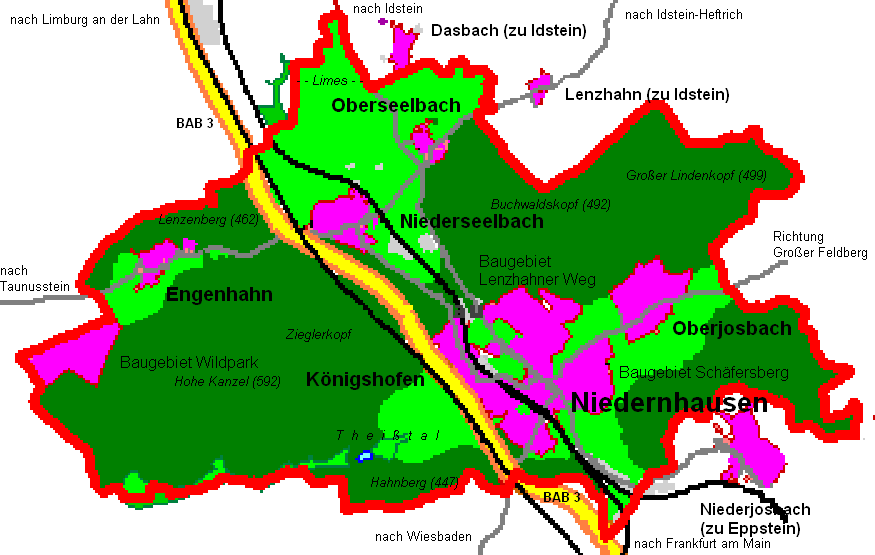
Overview map of the Niedernhausen municipal area with its centres

The main ridge of the Taunus, which at the same time forms the watershed between the Rhine and Main drainage basin in the south and the Lahn drainage basin in the north, runs through the municipal area from southwest to northeast. Parts of this ridge and also parts of the Rheingau-Taunus are the Hohe Kanzel ("High Pulpit"), at 592 m above sea level the community's highest elevation, and the Lenzenberg (492 m above sea level). South of these heights stretches the local recreation area and nature conservation area of Theißtal (or Theisstal) to the northeast on into the heart of Niedernhausen, north of which is the Engenhahn Valley (Engenhahner Tal), in which also runs the highway from high-lying Engenhahn to Niederseelbach in the outliers of the Idstein Basin. West of Niederseelbach stretches the Niedernhausen Basin. In the pit of the basin lies the community's core (lowest point near the town hall at 254 m above sea level), on the south slopes Königshofen, and on the north the new municipal developments of Niedernhausen along with the outlying centre of Oberjosbach.

The massif, which rises north of Niedernhausen, Oberjosbach and the more westerly Oberseelbach, is well into the High Taunus, and was once called Eichelberger Mark. It peaks with the Buchwaldskopf (492 m above sea level) and the Großer Lindenkopf (499 m above sea level). The highest elevation among the mountains south of the Theißtal (or Theiß Valley) is the Hahnberg (447 m above sea level).

Through the municipal area run four major streams. The biggest is the Daisbach, which comes from Engenhahn through the Engenhahn Valley to Niederseelbach and goes on through the Autal through Niedernhausen. It leaves the municipal area in the southwest going towards Niederjosbach and Eppstein, whereafter it is known as the Schwarzbach, emptying into the Main near Okriftel. The Theißbach rises in the Theißtal and empties into the Daisbach at Niedernhausen town hall. The Seelbach rises near Lenzhahn, flows through Oberseelbach and empties into the Daisbach near Niederseelbach. The Josbach rises near Oberjosbach, and in Niederjosbach likewise empties into the Daisbach.

Through the municipal area likewise run the tracks of the Main-Lahn railway, east–west through the Autal, from Frankfurt to Limburg an der Lahn. Running parallel thereto are the A 3 and the Cologne-Frankfurt high-speed rail line, which each cross the Theißtal on an imposing bridge.

Mountains in the Niedernhausen municipal area
Peak	Height	Range
Hohe Kanzel	592 m above sea level	Rheingau-Taunus
Großer Lindenkopf	499 m above sea level	Rheingau-Taunus
Buchwaldskopf	492 m above sea level	Rheingau-Taunus
Lenzenberg	462 m above sea level	Rheingau-Taunus
Hahnberg	447 m above sea level	Rheingau-Taunus
Hellenberg	436 m above sea level	Rheingau-Taunus
Eselskopf	391 m above sea level	Rheingau-Taunus

=== Geology ===
The mountain ridge, to which the Hohe Kanzel also belongs, is made of hard, weathered, but also cracked and permeable quartzite rock. Its layers are set steeply and often vertically. This yellowish-white, sometimes cherry-red-streaked Taunus quartzite arose from sandy sea depositions. Through the mountain range's compression and the attendant exothermic reaction, the original sedimentary stone changed into metamorphic quartzite.

In some spots in the Niedernhausen municipal area are found outcrops of this quartzite. Among these are a block on the peak of the Hohe Kanzel and the 479 m-high Hohler Stein (“Hollow Stone”) between Niedernhausen and Lenzhahn. The latter was placed under nature conservation in 1929. Near the Niedernhausen Autobahn on-ramp lies the so-called Grauer Stein (“Grey Stone”), near which is also found an old quartzite mine.

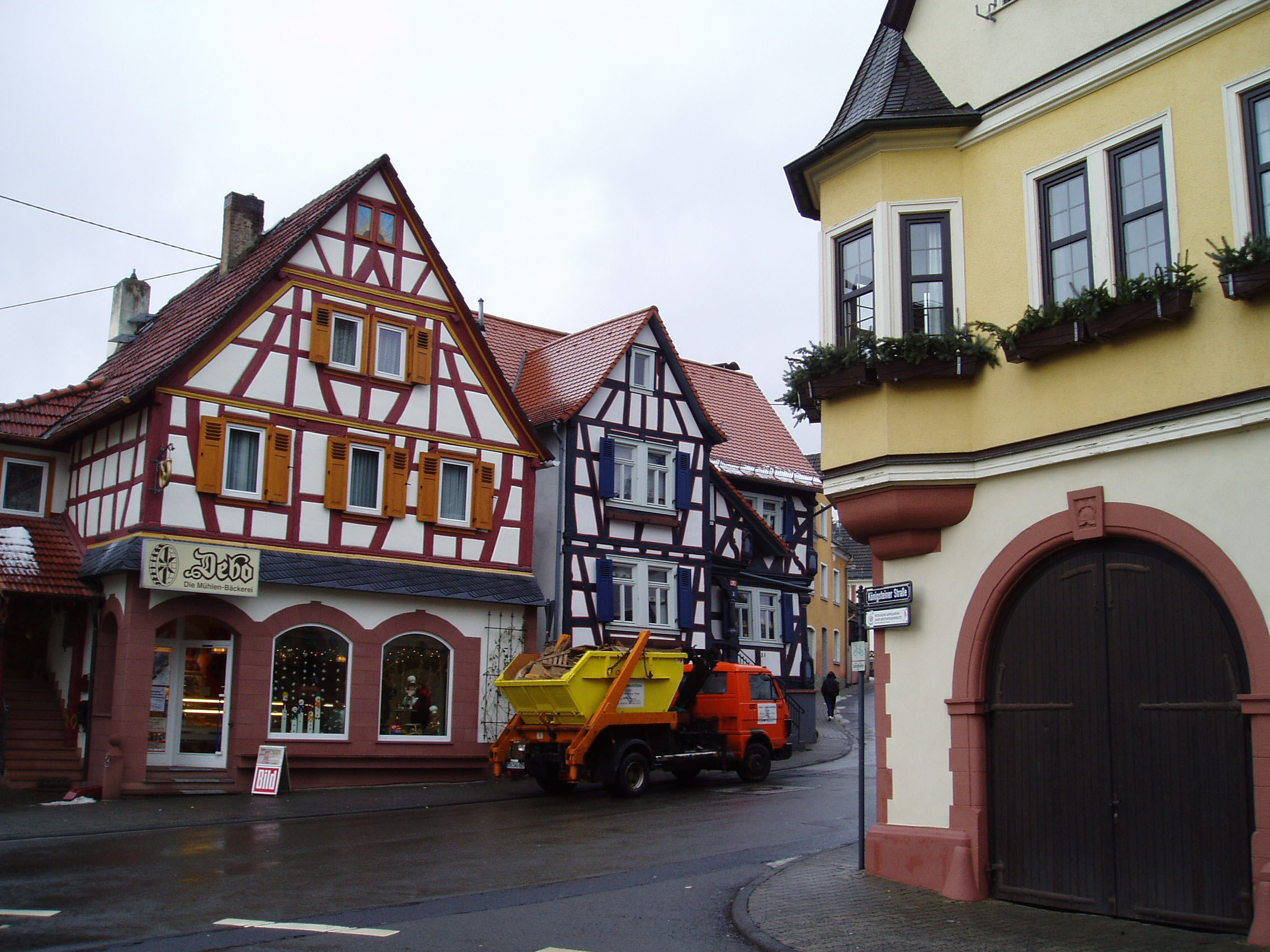
Timber-frame houses in the outlying centre of Oberjosbach

=== Constituent communities ===
Niedernhausen's Ortsteile are the formerly self-governing communities of Engenhahn, Königshofen, Niedernhausen, Niederseelbach, Oberjosbach and Oberseelbach. In Niedernhausen alone live more than half the inhabitants. This is also where the great building areas of Lenzhahner Weg and Schäfersberg are found.

Niedernhausen's centres
Centre	Population
Niedernhausen ^{1}	7,700
Oberjosbach	2,150
Niederseelbach	2,000
Königshofen	1,900
Engenhahn ^{2}	1,350
Oberseelbach	450

1. with the building areas of Lenzhahner Weg and Schäfersberg
2. with the building area of Wildpark

=== Neighbouring communities ===
Niedernhausen borders in the west on the town of Taunusstein, in the west and north on the town of Idstein (both in the Rheingau-Taunus-Kreis), in the east on the town of Eppstein (Main-Taunus-Kreis) and in the south on the district-free city of Wiesbaden, the state capital.

== History ==
=== Beginnings and Roman border area (1st century AD) ===
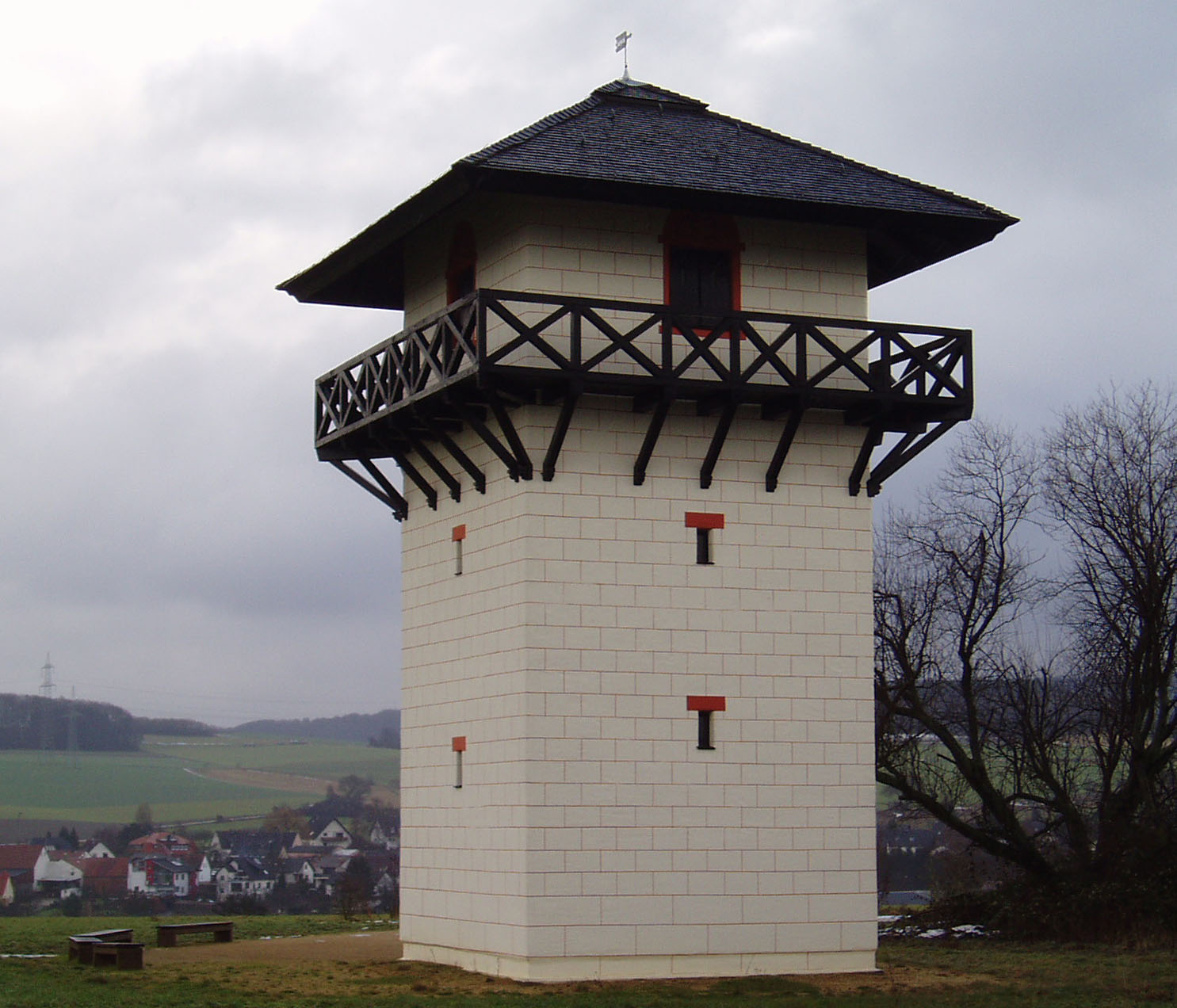
Reconstructed Roman watchtower on the Dasbach Heights between Idstein and Oberseelbach

In 1974, a stone hatchet was found near Oberjosbach that was dated to the time of the “Beaker Cultures” of the New Stone Age (2300-1600 BC). There is no hint as to whether the area was settled, although it does prove a human presence.

About the beginning of the Christian Era, the Romans came into what is now the Niedernhausen municipal area. Beginning in AD 86 they began work on the Limes between the places now known as Oberseelbach and Idstein; on 15 July 2005, UNESCO proclaimed it a World Heritage Site. The Niedernhausen area lay on the Roman side of the frontier, and what would later become Idstein on the Germanic side. On the Dasbach Heights, on the highway between Niedernhausen and Idstein, a replica of a Roman watchtower was built right near Niedernhausen municipal limits on the occasion of the 2002 Hessentag, state festival in Idstein. Some 2 km north of Oberseelbach, near Idstein-Heftrich, was the Roman castrum of Alteburg.

=== First traces in the Middle Ages and documentary mentions (1196–1283) ===
Niedernhausen's two original centres were the parishes of Oberjosbach and Niederseelbach.

The former had its first documentary mention in 1196 as Oberjosbach “augmented with God’s grace to the populace and estate” and thereby acquiring the “full freedom of a mother church” from the Archbishop of Mainz. Saint Michael's parish actually had no existence in the Middle Ages. However, the church developed into a church centre. The settlement of Oberjosbach, on the other hand, might have existed as early as the 10th century, which would make it the oldest in the current municipal area.

The old Johanneskirche (Saint John's Church) in the meadowlands near Niederseelbach was, however, the hub of the so-called Seelbacher Grund, which comprised the centres of Oberseelbach, Engenhahn, Lenzhahn, Königshofen and Niedernhausen. Moreover, the parish priest at Niederseelbach was also responsible for the branch church in Dasbach. If the Seelbacher Grund also belonged to the parish of Oberjosbach, the ways were parted about 1220 when the House of Nassau launched the independent parish of Niederseelbach. The church's origins may well reach back into Carolingian times about 800, when a rural church stood here.

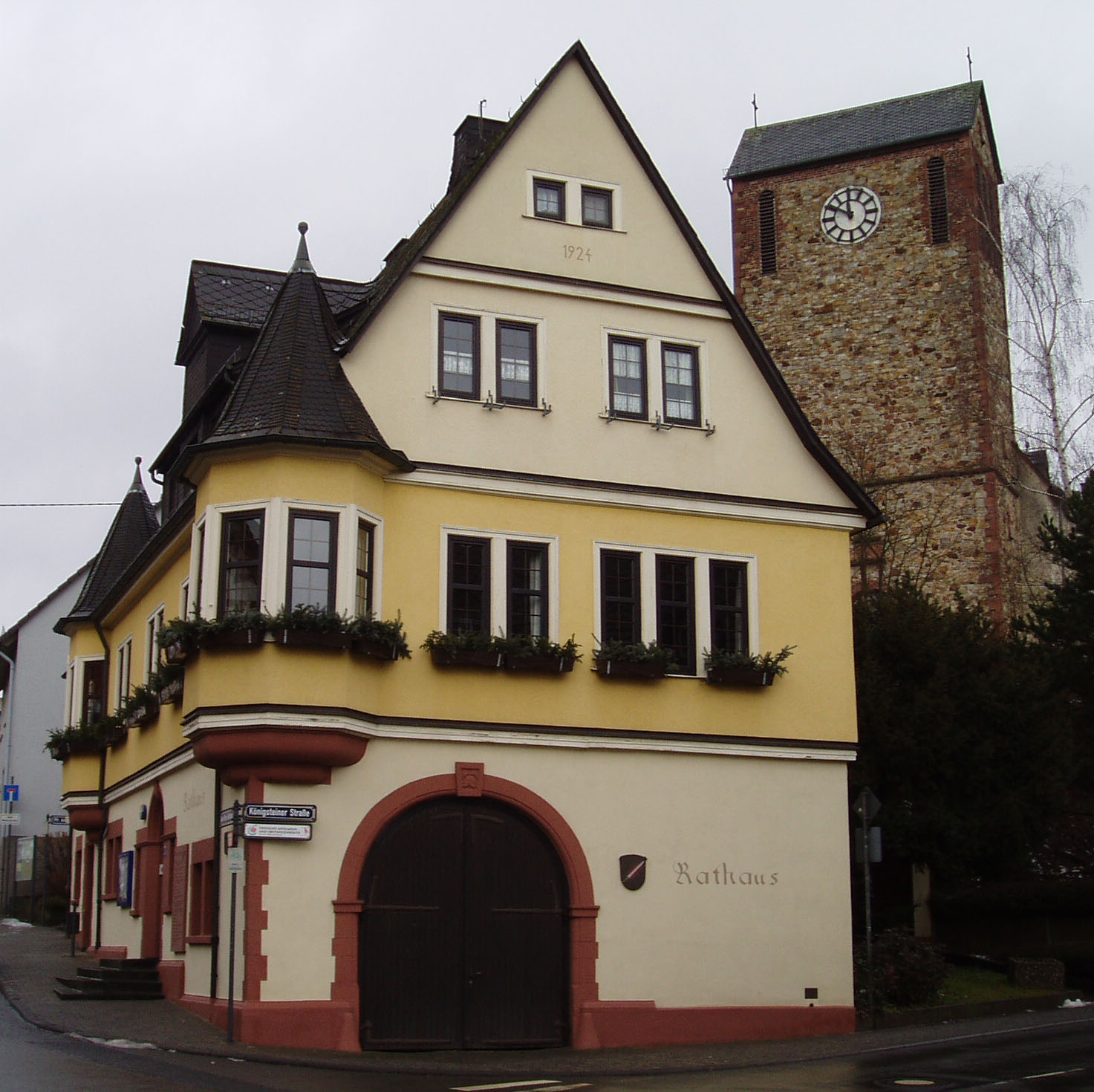
Town Hall and Saint Michael's Catholic Church, rebuilt after the Second World War, in Oberjosbach

Engenhahn's founding goes back to the founding of the Bleidenstadt Monastery in 775, within whose bounds so-called Meierhöfe (sing. Meierhof, roughly “chamberlain’s estate”) were built. A monk by the name of Enicho founded one such place, thereby becoming Engenhahn's namesake, with the name first appearing as Enicho im Hag or Unechenhagin. The place had its first documentary mention in 1221.

Oberseelbach first cropped up, along with Lenzhahn, as Medietas Ville superioris Selebach in a Schloßborn tithe register. This can be dated to some time between 1226 and 1233. Königshofen and Niedernhausen had their first documentary mentions about 1220 in a directory from Saint Stephen's as Villa in Kunigishoue and Niederinhusin respectively.

=== Border disputes between Nassau-Idstein and Eppstein (1283–1806) ===
From the Early Middle Ages, the Niedernhausen municipal area was in the thick of the border disputes between two lordly houses, Nassau and Eppstein. These came to a head in the 13th century with a feud, during which the new parish church at Oberjosbach was once again destroyed, only being built anew and reconsecrated in 1321. The feud was settled in the 1283 Sühnevertrag (“Atonement Treaty”), in which territorial sovereignty was newly ordered. Nevertheless, the rather fluid border between the two houses’ domains was not truly fixed until some time about 1500.

The small settlement of Obernhausen lying in the border area, a counterpart to Niedernhausen (Ober— and Nieder— are German for “Upper” and “Nether” or “Lower”) fell victim during this time to the Plague. By 1544, the settlement no longer existed.

The Reformation led to a further separation between the places in the Seelbacher Grund and Oberjosbach. The latter, after having been Protestant from 1540 to 1604, became Catholic again because it had belonged to Electoral Mainz since 1581. The parishioners in Niederseelbach, on the other hand, became Lutheran as of 1581, matching their lords, the Counts of Nassau-Idstein, in religious affiliation.

This configuration remained in place even by the end of the Thirty Years' War. The war had wrought great misfortune on the villages: Niedernhausen, Königshofen and Engenhahn were almost utterly depopulated; in Oberseelbach only 14 inhabitants survived.

After the Peace of Westphalia, Count Johannes of Nassau-Idstein settled Walloons from the Prince-Bishopric of Liège in the county's emptied centres, among them Niedernhausen, Königshofen and Engenhahn. These settlers he gave leave to keep their Catholic faith, while nevertheless putting them under Niedernhausen's Lutheran priest. Still today, a few Wallonian surnames can be found in Niedernhausen.

The Elector-Archbishop of Mainz, Anselm Franz von Ingelheim, replaced the chapel in Oberjosbach with a church in the Renaissance style in 1680.

In 1723 the border between Idstein and Eppstein was marked with border stones, which on one side showed the Lion of Nassau and on the other the Wheel of Mainz. These stones can still be seen between Niedernhausen and Oberjosbach. In 1728, the Elector-Archbishop Lothar Franz von Schönborn revived the parish in Oberjosbach, in which the Catholics of the Seelbacher Grund found a new home, the border notwithstanding. The school in Niederseelbach had its first documentary mention in 1778. It was attended by children from the surrounding villages.

=== Duchy of Nassau, railway building and open-air resort (1806–1914) ===
In 1806, the Duchy of Nassau was founded, rendering the border between Niedernhausen and Oberjosbach, which had been in force since the Middle Ages, meaningless.

In 1859, Oberseelbach, together with the neighbouring places Dasbach and Lenzhahn, both of which now belong to Idstein, founded a school board. The new school building was opened in 1863.

The great upswing came with the building of the railway, including Niedernhausen station in 1877. The Main-Lahn Railway thereafter linked the Frankfurt Rhine Main Region with Limburg an der Lahn. When the opening of the Ländches Railway to Wiesbaden opened in 1879, Niedernhausen even became a railway junction. The first railway station building arose in 1880, and in 1906 a new, representative building went up, and with it also came track and handling facilities for the steam locomotives. An old locomotive shed with a watertower is still preserved. In 1913, the line was double-tracked. In 1903, Niederseelbach acquired its own halt, which was, however, closed again in 1971.

The population, which hitherto had for centuries been oriented towards agriculture and forest endeavours, now had the opportunity to pursue industrial occupations or work in crafts in the cities and towns that could now easily be reached. Not only Niedernhausen and Niederseelbach, but also the outlying villages profited from this. Given the now easy access, Niedernhausen even managed to rise to become a Luftkurort (roughly, “open-air resort”), which resort guests could comfortably reach by rail. Many old hotel villas from the Gründerzeit in the former resort quarter at the Schöne Aussicht (“Lovely View”) bear witness to this time. Moreover, the old youth hostel is still to be found on Frankfurter Straße. The unofficial resort house was the former Pulvermühle (“Powder Mill”) in the Theiß valley on the boundary between Königshofen and Niedernhausen. About the turn of the 20th century, Niedernhausen's population reached about 1,200.

=== Weimar Republic, Third Reich and Second World War (1918–1945) ===
After the First World War, the Rhine's left bank along with the three bridgeheads, Cologne, Koblenz and Mainz and also areas within 30 km of each of them, were occupied by the Allies. Niedernhausen and the places that are now its outlying centres found themselves under French occupation; at times several hundred soldiers were present. From September 1919, troops had been withdrawn from the smaller centres. In November 1919, the first community representative elections were held, at which for the first time women were also allowed to vote.

Even after the First World War, many resort guests and summer visitors came to Niedernhausen, among them many Jews. Perhaps these circumstances and the Walloons’ settling in Niedernhausen centuries earlier explain why the presence of foreign cultures was considered normal. Whatever the truth is, there are no stories of political activity from the time of the Third Reich worth mentioning, although there was a so-called Führer-Schule which served as a training centre for the Hitler Youth.

As in many German municipalities, there were renamings in Niedernhausen of streets and buildings: there was a Hindenburgplatz, and part of Niederseelbacher Straße in Königshofen and Austraße in Niedernhausen were each named Adolf-Hitler-Straße. The teachers at the schools, according to reports from the pupils, seem all to have been quite in line with the Party and spurred their pupils into gathering relief supplies. There were, however, scattered reports here of voices critical of the régime. A staffer at the Führer-Schule, for instance, cancelled the subscription to the propaganda newspaper Der Stürmer out of hand, although she had to face consequences for this. When the mayor ordered the community's evacuation shortly before the war ended, the populace simply laughed at him.

With the building of the Autobahn between 1937 and 1939 came a further upswing, as Niedernhausen also got an interchange that could be used by the rising number of cars. The building of the Theißtalbrücke (“Theiß Valley Bridge”), which was finished before the outbreak of the Second World War, employed up to 700 workers, who were housed in Niedernhausen and had to be supplied.

After having been spared early on in the Second World War, things changed with the Allies’ advance beginning in 1944. Owing to the community's importance as a railway junction and the resident Führer-Schule with its transmission facilities, the community was notably more heavily bombed than comparable places in the area. Between May 1944 and March 1945 there were at least eight air raids. In the heaviest, on 22 February 1945, the railway station building, a great deal of the trackage, roughly 30 parked locomotives and dozens of other pieces of rolling stock were destroyed.

Struck by the air raid were not only the railway facilities, but also several dwelling buildings in Niedernhausen and Königshofen. In July 1944, a train coming from Eppstein was bombed; it is estimated that this resulted in 30 to 40 deaths. On the night of 25 to 26 August 1944, the Oberjosbach parish church burnt right down to the foundations after having been struck by an incendiary bomb. All together, roughly 200 people were killed in these air raids. Even today, many bomb craters are still to be found in the woods around Niedernhausen.

In the air raids in August 1944, three US servicemen who had parachuted to earth were lynched by the populace upon landing.

When the Americans came by way of Engenhahn and Niederseelbach to Königshofen and Niedernhausen, there was no resistance. The GIs’ quick advance may well be what spared the Theiß Valley Bridge the customary demolition by retreating German forces.

=== Postwar era (1945–1975) ===
After the Second World War, as was so throughout West Germany, many refugees and Germans driven out of their lands in the former eastern territories and the Sudetenland came into the individual centres, above all Oberjosbach, Niedernhausen, Königshofen and Niederseelbach. Niederseelbach's population, for instance, thereby swelled by 1960 to twice what it had been in 1939. In the 1950s, consequently, the first new municipal developments arose.

The rebuilt parish church in Oberjosbach had already opened in 1949.

In Engenhahn, the Wildparkgelände at first became an area for weekend houses. Beginning in 1975, it became an official and exclusive building area in which prominent persons such as Wim Thoelke, Ebby Thust and Susanne Fröhlich live (or lived).

In 1964, Oberseelbach took part for the first time in the contest Unser Dorf soll schöner werden (“Our Village Should Become Lovelier”), and in 1965 won the state victory for Hesse.

When the Rhine-Main S-Bahn was being planned and it could be foreseen that Niedernhausen would be one of the termini, the community experienced a sharp rise in population. The big building development of Lenzhahner Weg then came into being. In the 1970s, four highrise blocks of flats were built along with a dozen other major blocks. The first S-Bahn train, running on line 2, reached Niedernhausen station on 25 August 1975.

In 1970, the Oberseelbach bypass was opened, freeing the community's narrow main street of through traffic.

=== Boundary adjustments and municipal reform (1971 to present) ===
On 1 October 1971, the communities of Niedernhausen and Königshofen signed – despite an age-old aversion towards each other – a boundary adjustment agreement and merged into the community of Niedernhausen im Taunus, with Königshofen keeping its identity as an Ortsteil.

In the course of municipal reform in Hesse, the community of Niedernhausen i. Ts was eventually formed on 1 January 1977 out of the hitherto self-governing communities of Niedernhausen with the Ortsteil of Königshofen, Engenhahn, Niederseelbach, Oberseelbach and Oberjosbach. At the same time, the community became part of the Rheingau-Taunus-Kreis, founded on the same date, whose seat is at Bad Schwalbach. Formerly, Niedernhausen had belonged to the Main-Taunus-Kreis.

Before this, there had been much earnest “courting” by Idstein and Niedernhausen of the communities in the Seelbacher Grund, giving rise to a third consideration that a self-governing community called Lenzenberg could be formed out of Engenhahn, Oberseelbach, Niederseelbach, Lenzhahn and Dasbach. In the end, though, Engenhahn, Oberseelbach and Niederseelbach chose to join Niedernhausen, while Lenzhahn and Dasbach, despite their centuries-long links with Oberseelbach and Niederseelbach, chose to join Idstein.

In the early 1980s, the old school building and town hall in Niedernhausen was expanded into the greater community's town hall, and the Autalhalle was built.

Beginning in 1985, a further great building area on the Schäfersberg, near Niedernhausen (main centre) was begun.

Today, over half of the greater community's population lives in Niedernhausen. The second biggest constituent community is Oberjosbach with 2,150 inhabitants; the smallest is Oberseelbach with 450. The centres of Oberjosbach, Oberseelbach, Niederseelbach and Engenhahn have therefore largely been able to keep their village character.

=== Population development since the founding of the greater community in 1977 ===
Niedernhausen has undergone since the founding of the greater community on 1 January 1977 a great rise in population. The figure rose from 12,055 at the census in May 1987 to 14,722 in June 2003. This represents a rise of more than 22% (district average: roughly 11%). The causes are, more than anything else, the community's favourable location with regards to transport and its proximity to nature, as well as the Schäfersberg building development that was going on during this time. However, over the last few years, the population growth has been stagnating because there is now very little land left to develop in the Lenzhahner Weg and Schäfersberg development areas, and no new land is being opened up to development.

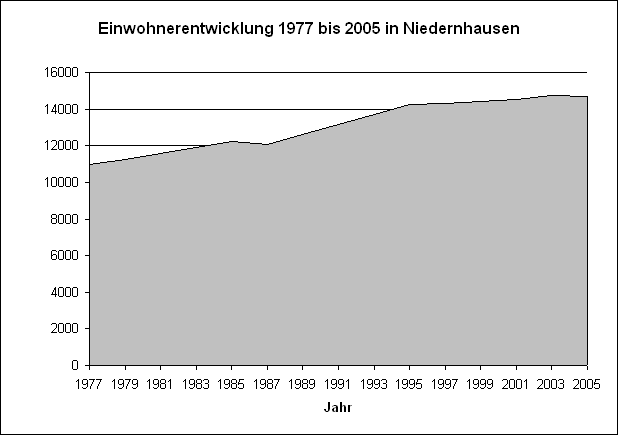
Population development since the 1977 municipal reform

Population development since 1977
Year	Inhabitants
01.01.1977	10,952
30.06.1985	12,220
31.05.1987	12,055 ^{*}
31.12.1994	14,231
30.06.2003	14,722
31.12.2004	14,648
30.06.2005	14,664

* Census result

== Politics ==
The community's mayor (Bürgermeister), and thereby also its administrative chief, has been since 1989 Günter F. Döring (SPD). He also became Niedernhausen's first directly elected mayor in 1995, being re-elected in both 2001 and 2007. In 2013 Joachim Reimann (CDU) was elected mayor; re-elected in 2018 but resigned in 2024. The current mayor is Dr. Norbert Beltz (SPD).

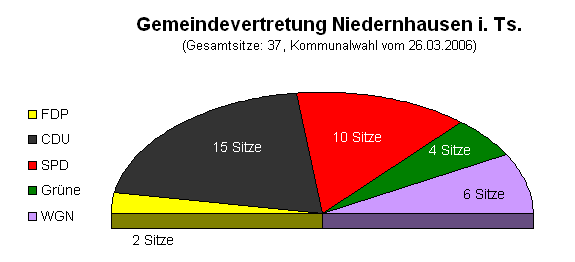
Seat distribution on Niedernhausen council

The community council (Gemeindevertretung), as Niedernhausen's highest political body, is elected every five years by all citizens who are eligible to vote. It has 37 seats. The last municipal election, held on 26 March 2006, yielded the following seat distribution: CDU: 15 seats, SPD: 10 seats, Bündnis 90/Die Grünen: 4 seats, FDP: 2 seats, Wählergemeinschaft Niedernhausen (WGN): 6 seats. The next municipal election will be held in 2011.

The council chooses a community executive (Gemeindevorstand). This has nine members (CDU: 3 members, SPD: 2 members, Bündnis 90/Die Grünen: 2 members). Among the members are also the mayor and the first deputy (Gerd Paustian, WGN).

The executive is supported by four boards which work on various issues, bringing them before the executive when a vote is needed. The four boards are the building board (Bauausschuss), the environmental board (Umweltausschuss), the social board (Sozialausschuss), and the main and financial board (Haupt- und Finanzausschuss). Each board has seven members (CDU: 3, SPD: 2, WGN: 1, Greens: 1).

The main and outlying centres’ concerns fall to the constituent community councils (Ortsbeiräte). They have an advisory function on community council and are composed according to municipal election results in each centre. The political bodies sit at the community's town hall in the main centre of Niedernhausen.

Election results in Niedernhausen from 1997 to 2006
Kind of election / Date	Eligible voters	Voter turnout	Votes cast			Share of valid votes					
Kind of election / Date	Eligible voters	Voter turnout	invalid		valid	CDU	SPD	FDP	GREENS	WGN ^{*}	Others
Kind of election / Date	Total	%	Total	%	Total	%					
Municipal 26.03.2006	11,227	48.3	79	1.5	5,423	39.5	26.3	6.4	10.5	17.4	--
Federal 18.09.2005	10,976	84.9	127	1.4	9,188	37.2	29.4	16.2	11.0	-	6.2
State 02.02.2003	10,857	72.1	109	1.4	7,724	53.0	22.4	9.5	11.4	-	3.7
Federal 22.09.2002	10,891	84.8	119	1.3	9,116	40.0	33.3	11.1	12.7	-	2.9
Municipal 18.03.2001	11,126	59.6	126	1.9	6,504	45.3	35.0	11.5	8.2	-	-
State 07.02.1999	10,705	71.6	81	1.1	7,582	49.2	32.5	7.8	7.4	-	3.1
Federal 27.09.1998	10,810	87,8	114	1.2	9,377	39.7	33.5	9.1	12.0	-	5.7
Municipal 02.03.1997	10,895	65.4	176	2.5	6,952	35.9	31.4	11.8	7.4	13.5	-

* Wählergemeinschaft Niedernhausen (Freie Wähler)

=== Administration ===
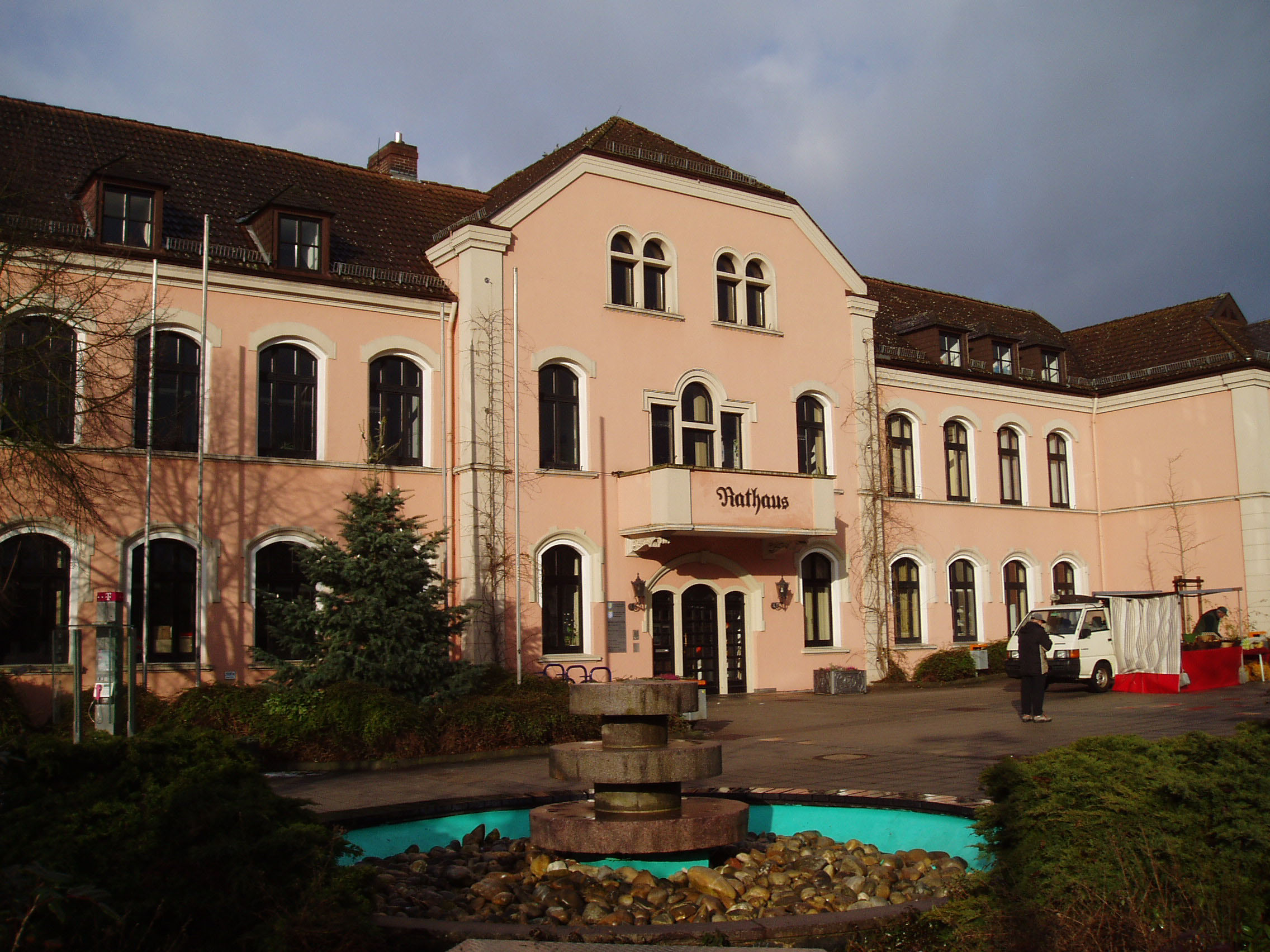
Town Hall of the greater community in Niedernhausen (main centre)

The community administration is mostly housed at the Town Hall. Here, citizens can find the building office, the bylaw enforcement office, the licensing office, the register office, the local court and contact people for environmental, family, sanitation, and sundry other matters. Working at Town Hall are roughly 50 administrative employees. Furthermore, the community runs its own building yard. Here some 20 employees take care of winter services, street cleaning, graveyard, sporting ground, playground and greenspace maintenance, and also repair and maintenance of community-owned institutions and buildings. The waterworks and sewerage are kept running by the community works, which is attached to the building yard. Moreover, there is a recycling yard. At the six municipal kindergartens, about 35 kindergarten teachers are employed. Responsible for traffic and environmental infractions is the bylaw enforcement office. For all other security concerns, there is the police station in Idstein. There are longstanding demands, however, for a local police presence.

=== Coat of arms ===
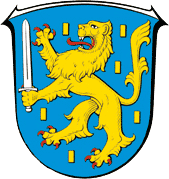

The community's arms might be described thus: Azure a lion rampant Or armed and langued gules among six billets of the second, in his forepaw sinister a sword argent held palewise.

The arms were created in 1977. The lion is from the arms borne by the Duchy of Nassau. The silver sword in the lion's left forepaw refers to Oberjosbach's Electoral Mainz past; this outlying centre's coat of arms shows a sword in Mainz's heraldic tinctures, and the sword is also one of the Archangel Michael's attributes, thus symbolizing Oberjosbach's patron saint. The billets (small rectangles) stand for the community's six centres.

=== Municipal partnerships ===
- Wilrijk (constituent community of Antwerp, Belgium)

The partnership has existed since 1980, when this was still a self-governing town (about 38,000 inhabitants). Since then, there has been a regular exchange, with cycling tours between the two places being arranged. Since 1984, Wilrijk has been a constituent community of Antwerp, which has changed nothing about the intensive relationship. The square before Niedernhausen's town hall was named after Wilrijk, making the community administration's address Wilrijkplatz (no house number).

- (Germany) Ilfeld (Harz, Thuringia)

The connection with the Thuringian town in the Harz (3,000 inhabitants) was spurred shortly after German reunification in 1990, likely also in the east to get some structural subsidies. The partnership between Ilfeld and Wilrijk, forged by Niedernhausen's initiative, has created a three-way partnership. The square before Niedernhausen's railway station has since its remodelling been known as Ilfelder Platz.

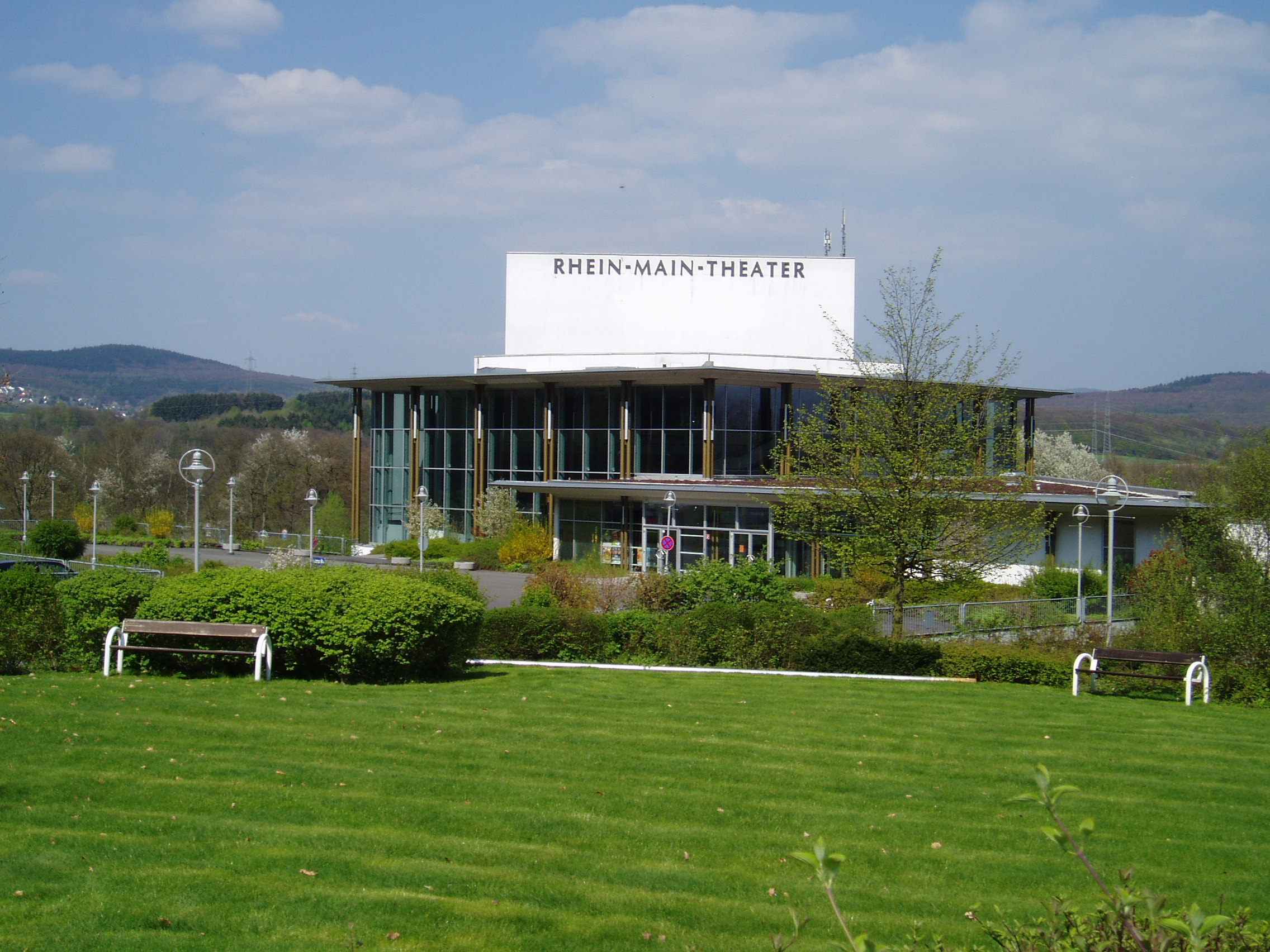
Rhein-Main-Theater in Niedernhausen

== Economy and infrastructure ==
=== Economy ===
Niedernhausen is generally said to be a bedroom town for the cities in the Frankfurt Rhine Main Region. At 30%, Wiesbaden has the greatest share of commuters from Niedernhausen, followed closely by Frankfurt am Main. The number of jobs has risen along with the population, although given the local commuting structure, the share of the population employed locally has always been rather slight, at about 10%. In June 1987, 1,192 persons were employed in Niedernhausen. By June 2002 this had risen by about 21% to 1,443. The share engaged in service businesses in 1987 was about 65%, and in 2002, 71%. The local purchasing power is about €21,346 for each inhabitant, putting it roughly 28.5% above the national average, and thereby also making it the highest figure for the Rheingau-Taunus-Kreis.

Niedernhausen is home to mostly small and midsize businesses, overwhelmingly in the service provision sector. Meanwhile, there are more than 30 high-technology firms, among them about 20 in information technology, as well as seven companies in measuring and control technology. The community's biggest employer, with 220 on staff, is Hartmann Druckfarben GmbH in Niederseelbach (printing inks) which has been an established business here since 1968. Another big employer, the RAMADA Hotel Micador, is a conference and convention hotel with 254 rooms and the adjoining Rhein-Main-Theater, which was built between 1993 and 1995 specially to present Andrew Lloyd Webber’s musical Sunset Boulevard.

Beginning in 1976 in the Schöne Aussicht, the biggest publishing house for German guidebooks, the FALKEN-Verlagsgruppe was resident. With 120 employees and roughly 1,200 available books, it generated a turnover of roughly €45,000,000. In 2000, however, the publishing house was taken over by the Bertelsmann concern and closed.

All together there are four industrial areas, a small one in each of Königshofen, Oberseelbach and Niederseelbach as well as a somewhat bigger one in Niedernhausen near the Autobahn interchange. Here it is planned to open up a further 5 ha or so of land to mixed and commercial development.

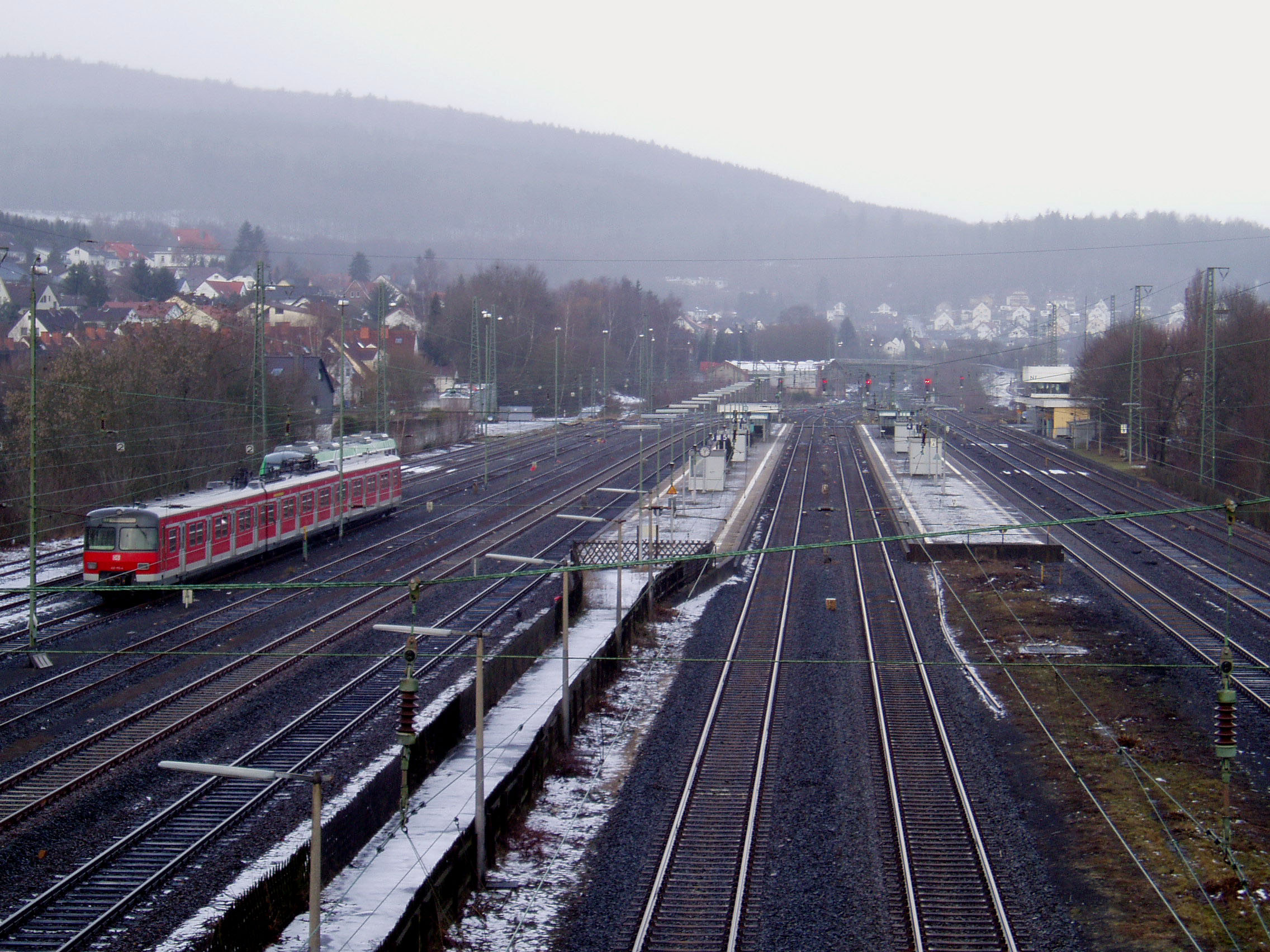
Niedernhausen station, a railway junction on the Main-Lahn-Bahn

=== Transport ===
Niedernhausen station lies on the Main-Lahn Railway running from Frankfurt am Main to Limburg an der Lahn. The line was opened in 1877, and the station is the main junction on this line between Frankfurt-Höchst and Eschhofen, as it is here that the Ländchen Railway branches off, running to Wiesbaden Hauptbahnhof in the Hesse state capital, Wiesbaden. The Ländchen Railway opened in 1879 and has historically provided an important regional link between the Main-Lahn Railway and Wiesbaden. Given its importance, Niedernhausen station was targeted by Allied bombers several times in the Second World War.

Since 1975, Niedernhausen has also been the outermost stop on the Rhine-Main S-Bahn’s line S2, which links the community with Frankfurt’s main station with a travel time of roughly 35 minutes, and since 1904, Niedernhausen is also the last stop on the Ländchen Railway, which connects Niedernhausen Station with Wiesbaden. Furthermore, the Cologne-Frankfurt high-speed rail line, with its Niedernhausener Tunnel runs through the municipal area.

Besides the train connections to Frankfurt am Main, Wiesbaden and Limburg an der Lahn, there is also a city bus connection to Wiesbaden (route 22 of the ESWE – Wiesbaden’s transport system) linking the centres of Oberjosbach, Niedernhausen and Königshofen to the state capital with a travel time of roughly 30 minutes. There is also a local bus service linking all outlying centres to the main centre and the railway station. Long-distance buses likewise call at Niedernhausen railway station.

There are no pedestrian precincts in Niedernhausen. Nevertheless, the main shopping street, Bahnhofsstraße (“Railway Station Street”) is a traffic-free one-way street which is completely blocked to motorized traffic for various events (wine festival, Christmas market, and so on).

In the Taunus woods around the community is a tight web of signposted hiking trails.

There is a “Park&Ride” facility available at Niedernhausen S-Bahn station. Likewise, a great number of parking spaces is on hand at the Niedernhausen forest swimming pool and the Rhein-Main-Theater. There are parking spaces in the main centre, too.

Niedernhausen has an interchange on the A 3 (Cologne–Frankfurt) lying roughly 2 km south of the main centre. Past the interchange and through the municipal area runs Bundesstraße 455.

Frankfurt Airport can be reached by Autobahn in about 20 minutes. By train – with a transfer at the main station in either Frankfurt or Wiesbaden – it takes roughly an hour. Given this easy access to the airport, Niedernhausen has also become a favourite choice among airport employees as a home.

== Infrastructure ==
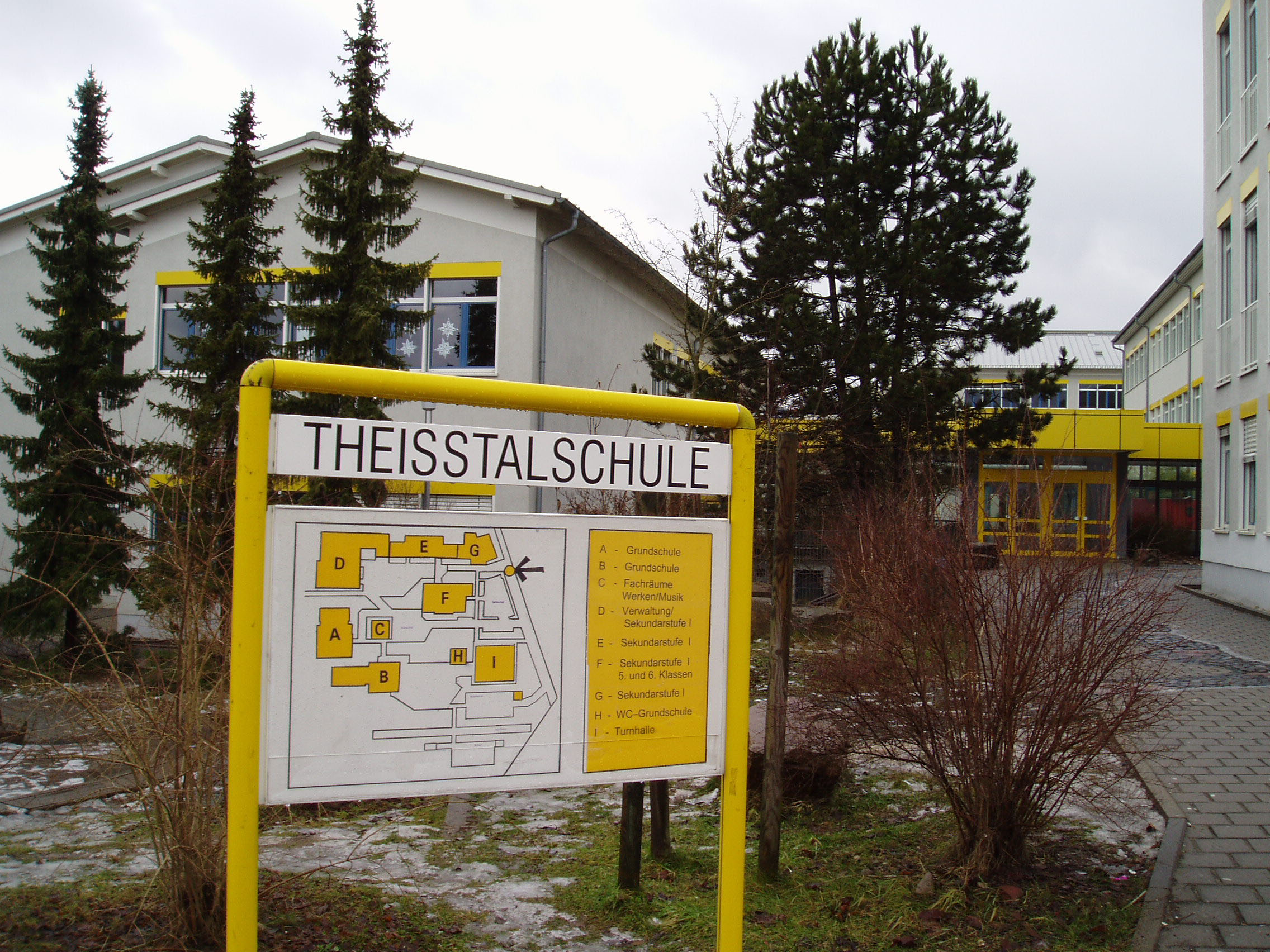
Theißtalschule, a coöperative comprehensive school in Niedernhausen (main centre)

=== Schools ===
In Niedernhausen there are two public schools. The Theißtalschule in the main centre was expanded in the late 1990s from a primary school with orientation level (Förderstufe) into a cooperative comprehensive school with primary level and also Hauptschule, Realschule and Gymnasium branches. The Lenzenbergschule in the outlying centre of Niederseelbach is a so-called Mittelpunkts-Grundschule (“midpoint primary school”, a central school, designed to eliminate smaller outlying schools) for the outlying centres of Engenhahn, Niederseelbach and Oberseelbach. In the outlying centre of Königshofen are also found a private Gymnasium and a music school.

=== Churches ===
Within community limits are three Catholic churches, two Protestant and one New Apostolic. The Catholic ones are Maria Königin in Niedernhausen, St. Michael in Oberjosbach and St. Martha in Engenhahn. The two Protestant parishes are Christuskirche in Niedernhausen and another in Niederseelbach with Niedernhausen's oldest church, the Johanneskirche from the 15th century. The old Catholic church in Niedernhausen is now used as a cultural centre. The Catholic churches belong to the parish St. Martin Idsteiner Land.

=== Sport and leisure facilities ===
In Niedernhausen there are several football pitches, among them two paved ones in Engenhahn and Niederseelbach as well as an artificial-turf pitch in Niedernhausen. Besides those, there are three smaller sporting grounds in Niedernhausen, Königshofen and Oberjosbach as well as an athletics facility attached to the Theißtalschule. The great three-field sporting hall, the Autalhalle is used not only by local clubs, but also for trade fairs and sundry other events. The schools and the bigger sport clubs each have their own halls. Furthermore, there are a tennis club that plays on several courts and in a hall, a riding ring, several skittle alleys and the Waldschwimmbad (“forest swimming pool”) with several basins, slides and a diving tower. Right next to the pool, a rollerskating rink was opened in July 2006. The local Theißtal recreation area offers, besides several barbecue areas, a great angling pond. In the centre of Engenhahn, in severe winters, cross-country skiing trails are laid out.

=== Kindergartens, daycare, after-school care and community centers ===
All together six municipally owned kindergartens are to be found in the centres of Niedernhausen (Ahornstraße and Schäfersberg), Königshofen, Niederseelbach, Oberjosbach and Engenhahn. Moreover, the Catholic Church runs the St. Josef kindergarten. A private parents’ association runs a rhythmic-musical kindergarten called TASIMU with daycare and after-school care. Besides the great three-field sporting hall with caterer's (Autalhalle), community buildings are to be found in every other centre for events. Furthermore, next to the town hall carpark is a revamped old slaughterhouse that now serves as a youth centre. Youngsters can play billiards or table football, or simply “chill” and have a drink, or listen to bands that appear on the small stage.

== Culture and sightseeing ==
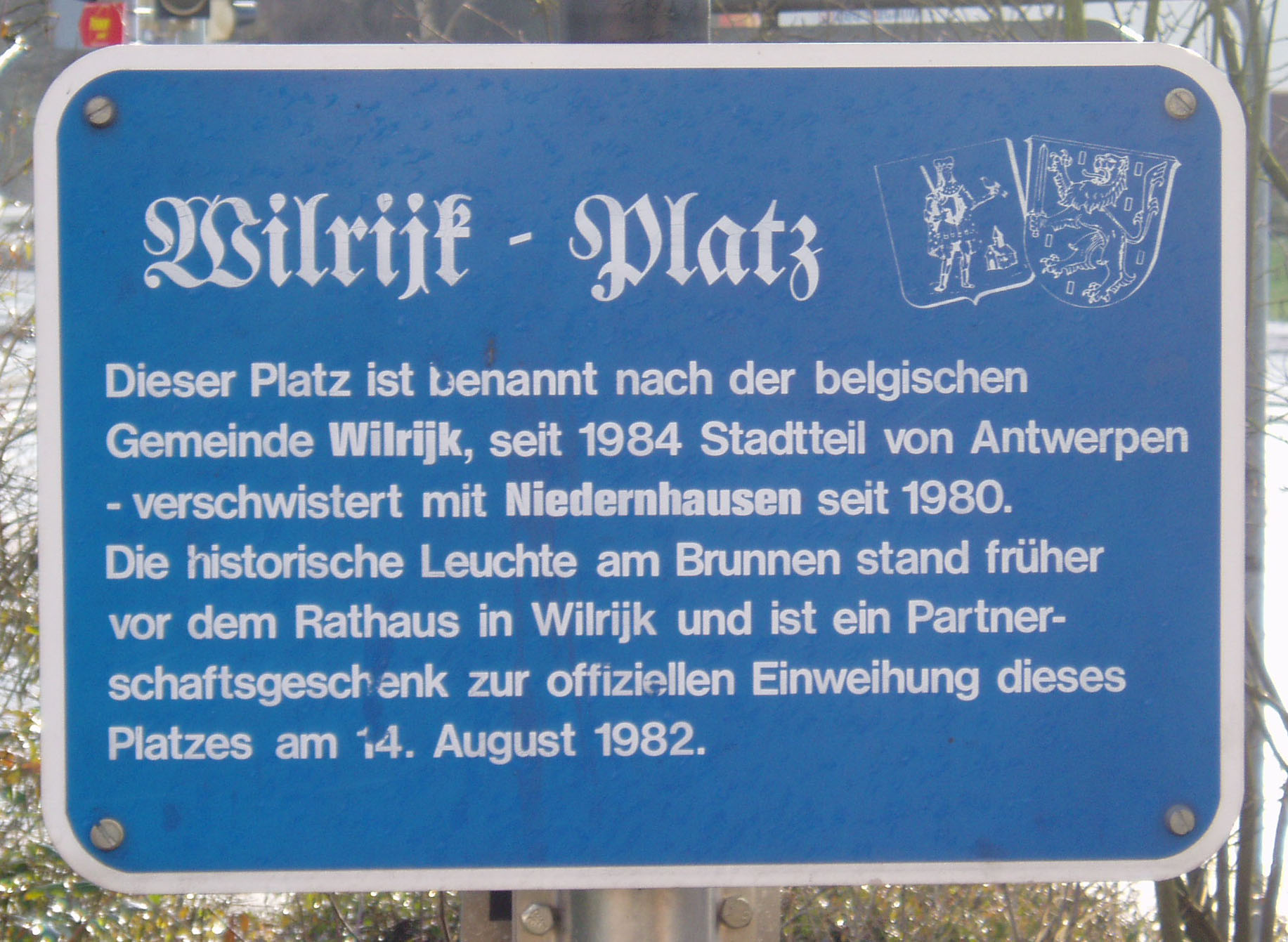
Sign at Wilrijk-Platz before Niedernhausen's town hall

=== Rhein-Main-Theater ===
The nationally known Rhein-Main-Theater, right on the Niedernhausen Autobahn interchange, is used for many international events. The house, with 1,566 seats shared between the stalls and two galleries, was built between 1993 and 1995 at a cost of €25,000,000 specially to present the first German-language production of Andrew Lloyd Webber’s musical Sunset Boulevard. The play ran from December 1995 to August 1998, with the leads being played by the well known musical stars Uwe Kröger und Helen Schneider, and later also the actress Daniela Ziegler. Nevertheless, the star-studded cast could not stave off insolvency. Today, changing events take place at the theatre. The halt on the Ländchesbahn (railway), built specially for the theatre, was opened in 1996 and after the theatre was for the time being closed in 1998, the halt, too, was closed.

=== Other event venues and institutions ===
Besides the Rhein-Main-Theater there is also a whole series of further event venues in Niedernhausen, including the Zentrum Alte Kirche (ZAK) and the youth club I4. The Old Catholic Church on Wiesbadener Straße deteriorated in condition after the Catholic parish shifted their house of worship to the new church on Bahnhofstraße. Then, in 1980, a private club took over the leasehold for 99 years, had the building put under monumental protection and renovated it on its own initiative.

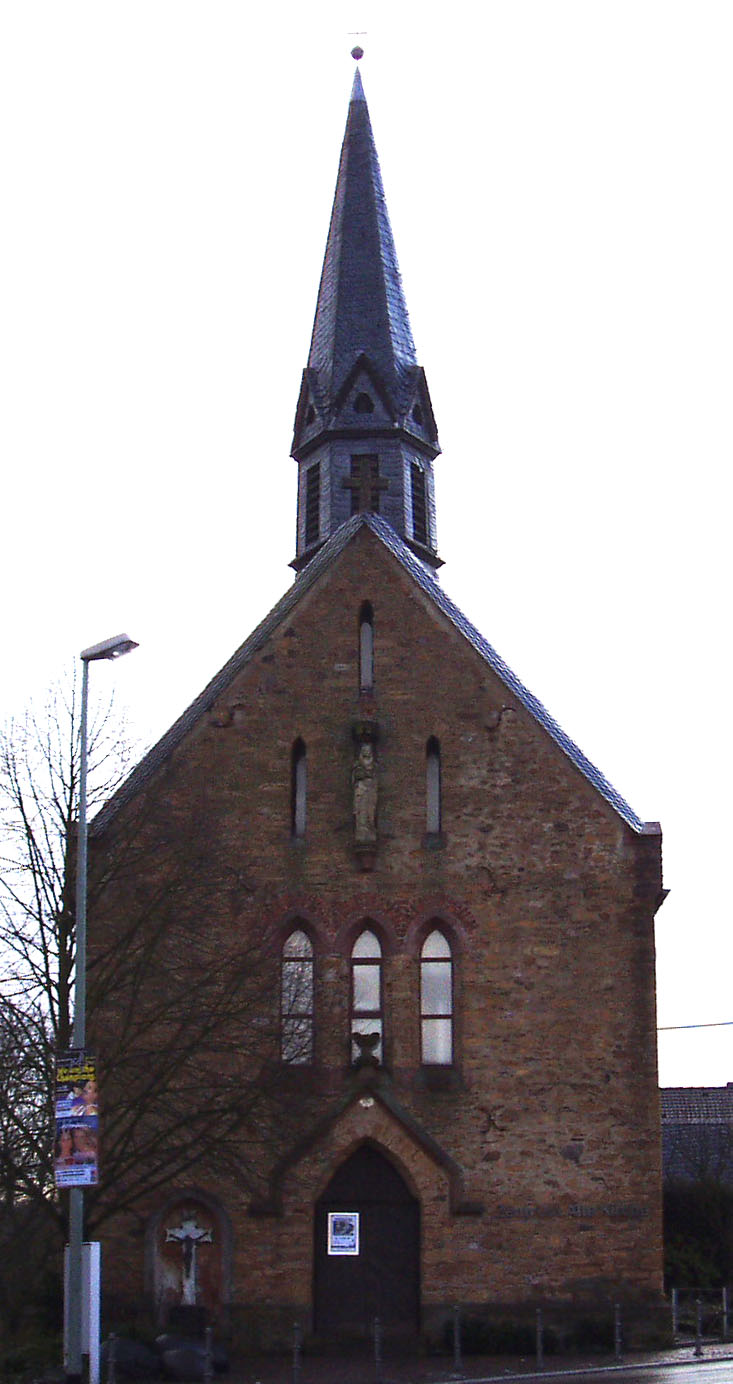
Zentrum Alte Kirche in Niedernhausen: formerly a Catholic church, today a cultural centre

Youths first organized themselves in the late 1980s with the community's encouragement and support. Their first home was in a room in the Autalhalle, before the community acquired a shabby building across from the Town Hall in 1992. The youths made out of their Wiesbadener Straße 2 – W2 for short – a thriving place with many of their own initiatives. In the end, when the building was at last going to be torn down, they got ready to move. The former butcher's shop with adjoining slaughterhouse they converted as a volunteer project into a concert and event venue. Taking place at I4 (for Idsteiner Straße 4) today, besides the regular operations and several working groups are also rock concerts and parties.

Not only does The Autalhalle serve the Theißtalschule and local clubs as a sport hall, but also it offers, with its wheel-away grandstand, the adjoining caterer's and its configuration, which allows flexibility, a space for regular fairs, exhibitions and sundry other events. The Free Democratic Party and the Greens, for instance, have held their Hesse party conferences here in past years. Likewise, the community council sits here. At one time, the hall was even used as the “festival tent” at the Niedernhausen Kerb.

=== Clubs ===
Niedernhausen has roughly 100 clubs with thousands of members. Most clubs are dedicated to sport. The most successful of these is SV Niedernhausen, which is almost purely a football club. Since advancing in 2006, the club has played in the Gruppenliga Wiesbaden. The best known player is Christopher Ihm, who lives in Niedernhausen and is a former professional of 1.FSV Mainz 05. At Sportverein Niederseelbach 1951, it is mainly football that is played. The two clubs each have up to 18 teams in the various age groups from “G-Jugend” (those no older than 7) to the seniors’ team. Niederseelbach played for a time in the Bezirksoberliga Wiesbaden, and now currently plays in the "A-Klasse Rheingau-Taunus". The volleyball division of SV Niederseelbach has existed since 1981. SV Niederseelbach also offers an informal walking programme and Nordic walking.

Turngemeinde 1896 Niedernhausen, with roughly 1,000 active members the community's biggest club, Turn- und Sportverein Königshofen 1898, Turn- und Sportverein Engenhahn 1977 and Turngemeinde 1899 Oberjosbach all offer leisure sports. The two first ones each have an athletics and gymnastics division, both of which regularly take part in competitions, among them the Deutsches Turnfest and the Hesse State Gymnastics Festivals. All four clubs each have their own clubhouse and training ground. TG Niedernhausen also runs a big basketball division, which sometimes boasts as many as 10 teams. The first men's and the first women's teams each play in district class A.

Tennis-Club Niedernhausen, with about 400 members, plays on 9 outdoor courts (sand) and three indoor. At the tennis hall, moreover, are several squash courts. Worthy of notice are the Aikido-Club with roughly 130 members, which commits itself to Japanese self-defence arts, and the local DLRG chapter with roughly 260 members, who use the forest pool for their swimming sport. In the winter, this is done in indoor pools in Wiesbaden.

Likewise worth mentioning is the Intressengemeinschaft Reiten und Fahren e.V., Niedernhausen/Ts. (IRFN, riding club). The riding facilities, Am Hahnwald, which belong to the club have at their disposal, besides stabling, a dressage square, a show jumping square and a riding hall.

High in membership are also Ski-Club Niedernhausen with about 600, Kerbegesellschaft Veilchenblau Oberjosbach and Kerbeborsch Königshofen (both kermis clubs) with about 130 members.

Furthermore, there are Kerbeverein Niederseelbach (another kermis club), Schäfersbergteam, which stages various events in the Schäfersberg new building area, among them the Schäfersbergfest, as well as Frohsinn 1875 Engenhahn (men's singing), 1873 Niedernhausen, Eintracht 1885 Niederseelbach and fire brigade clubs in individual centres. In the smallest centre, the Heimat und Kulturverein Oberseelbach looks after, for instance, keeping up the baking tradition, the cultural community and maintaining the scenic heritage.

The Schützenverein Königshofen 1959 e.V. with about 200 members can boast its own indoor shooting range with 10 ×10 m airgun enclosures and 10 ×25 m and 6 ×50 m stalls.

The Vocal-Ensemble Le Courage e.V. is a women's choir of national importance. It was founded in 1977 by music director Wolfgang Diefenbach and has been led by him ever since. The choir currently has roughly 55 active singers aged between 14 and 75. They have made a number of recordings, and the ensemble has won 36 victories in regional and international choral contests and come in first at the Hesse Choral Competition.

=== Regular events ===
What follows is a selection of regular events in Niedernhausen:

- Gickellauf Engenhahn (established forest run and family festival, third Sunday in September)
- Schäfersbergfest (Schäfersberg neighbourhood)
- Gemeindeschießen (“Community Shooting”, Königshofen Shooting Club, mid-November)
- Weinfest Niedernhausen (wine festival, Bahnhofstraße)
- Zeltkerb Königshofen (“tent kermis”, Königshofen fairground, third weekend in August)
- Oberjosbacher Kerb (kermis, Oberjosbach community centre)
- Niederseelbacher Kerb (kermis, Niederseelbach, mid-October)
- TuFuMaBa (Fastnacht masquerade ball in Niederseelbach, Lenzenberghalle)
- Sportwoche Niederseelbach (“sport week”, Niederseelbach sporting ground, late July)
- Sport-Spiel-Spaß Oberjosbach (“sport-play-fun”, Jahnhalle, early September)
- Weihnachtsmarkt Niedernhausen (Christmas market, Bahnhofstraße, first weekend in Advent)
- Ausstellung Form-Bild-Farbe (“Shape-Image-Colour Exhibition”, Autalhalle)
- Orchideenschau (“Orchid Show”, Autalhalle)
- Gewerbeausstellung (business fair, Autalhalle)
- SV Niedernhausen's matches on the artificial-turf pitch at the Autalarena
- Sportfest Niederseelbach (Niederseelbach sporting ground, September)
- Great Dressage and Show Jumping tournament (Niedernhausen riding square)

=== Theiß Valley Bridge ===
The community's landmark is the Theißtalbrücke (“Theiß Valley Bridge”), part of the A 3, which spans the narrow Theiß Valley on 16 arches stretching across 500 m with a maximum height of 46 m. Parallel to it in the 1990s arose another bridge that carries the Cologne-Frankfurt high-speed rail line, whose dimensions are roughly the same as the older bridge's. The arch motif is used by the community's administration and a few clubs as a symbol.

=== Buildings ===
==== Johanneskirche (Evangelical church) ====
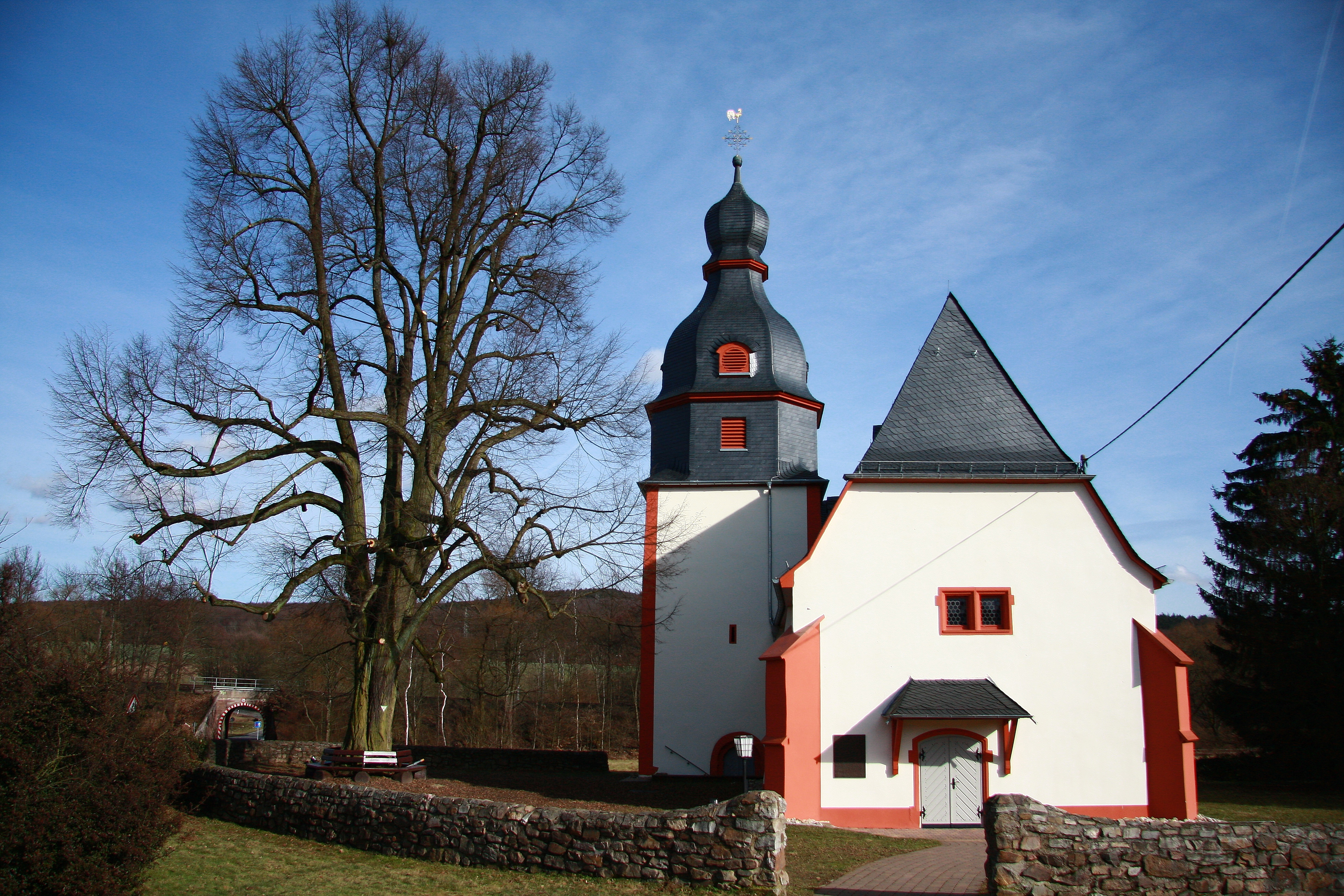
Johanneskirche (“Saint John’s Church”), an Evangelical church in Niederseelbach with 200-year-old limetree

The Johanneskirche in Niederseelbach was from the Middle Ages the Seelbacher Grund’s religious and spiritual hub. It is the most valuable historic building in the greater community of Niedernhausen. When the church was built is unknown, although there must have been a forerunner building at the time when the parish was founded about 1220 by the Counts of Nassau. The church's somewhat off-centre location in relation to the Niederseelbach village core is a clue that the church might have begun as a rural church (Feldkirche), as was customary in Carolingian times about 800.

The church is a plain building with a flat-ceilinged single nave and a quire. Adjoining it on the north side is the tower, which has an underground vault. A few jutting corbels on the walls and in the quire are all that is left of the former Gothic vaulting, which itself might put the nave's building date in the 15th century. The tower acquired its Welsche Haube (the particular kind of cupola seen here) in 1790.

==== Catholic churches ====
The church St. Michael in Oberjosbach goes back to the founding of the parish of Oberjosbach in 1196. The church has, however, been destroyed several times, having been built anew in 1321, 1728 and most recently in 1949.

The church St. Martha in Engenhahn was built in 1890 and 1891 in the Gothic Revival style after the Catholic inhabitants split from the parish of Oberjosbach in 1888 and were assigned to the parish of Idstein.

The old Catholic church in Niedernhausen was consecrated in 1885, after the growing community's Catholics made it known that they did not want to make the long trip to Oberjosbach anymore. After the so-called Kapellenstreit (“Chapel dispute”) over what Königshofen's share towards the church should be, the community of Mariä Geburt was finally founded on 1 October 1904, which the Bishop of Limburg an der Lahn raised to parish on 1 May 1921. Since the new church was built on Bahnhofstraße in 1960, the old church has been used as a cultural centre, and the parish has called itself Maria Königin.

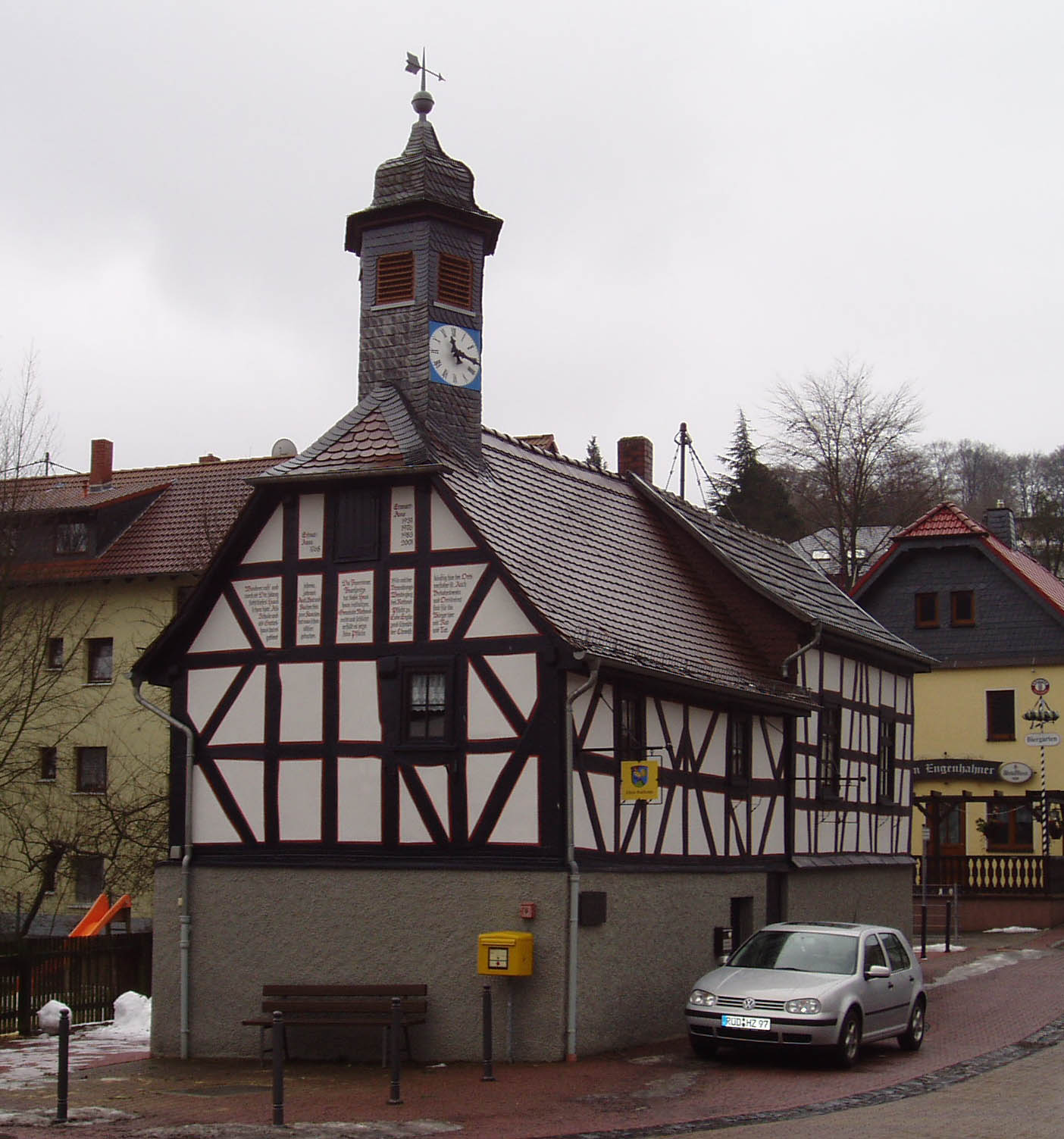
Old town hall in Engenhahn from 1768

==== Historical town halls and school buildings ====
Historical town halls are to be found in the centres of Oberjosbach und Engenhahn. The Engenhahn town hall was built in 1768, served beginning in 1820 as a school and later housed the community administration until 1977. The building is a timber-frame house under monumental protection, as is the old bakehouse (Backes) in Oberseelbach.

The town hall in Niedernhausen, which today serves as the community's administrative seat, was originally a school building built in 1903, in which the mayor's office was also housed. In 1981, it was expanded into a representative building and is today a further community landmark.

==== Other secular buildings ====
The old Gasthaus zum Anker right near the town hall, built towards the end of the 17th century, had an eventful history behind it. From 1734, it was an inn. It was under monumental protection, but it was threatening to fall asunder, and was in the end torn down on 23 February 2008.

In Königshofen the old locomotive shed and an old watertower bear witness to Niedernhausen's time as a railway stronghold.

Also worth seeing are the Gründerzeit villas, an open-air resort, on the Schöne Aussicht.

=== Nature ===
The Rhein-Taunus Nature Park, much of which is wooded, lies within community limits and abuts residential areas in places. Of particular scenic charm is the ridge running between a line between Niederseelbach and Engenhahn and the local recreation and conservation area of the Theiß valley running parallel thereto. The highest elevation is the Hohe Kanzel at 592 m above sea level. From west to east, a dale runs through the municipal area, over whose slopes Niedernhausen's residential neighbourhoods stretch. In Oberjosbach is found a 500-year-old oak. North of Niedernhausen, on the Eselskopf, are a few bizarre crag formations in the middle of the forest (Hohler Stein – “Hollow Stone”).

== Famous people ==
- Wim Thoelke (1927–1995), master of ceremonies and creator of the quiz show Der große Preis, lived until his death in Engenhahn and is buried at the graveyard there
- Helen Schneider (1952– ), singer and actress, played the lead rôle of Norma Desmond from 1995 to 1997 in the musical Sunset Boulevard at the Rhein-Main-Theate
- Uwe Kröger (1964– ), best known musical performer in the German-speaking world; worked from 1995 to 1997 as main performer at the Rhein-Main-Theater
- Jens Keller (1970– ), former German footballer (last club Eintracht Frankfurt - until 2005) lived until 2005 in Königshofen
