= Wim Thoelke =

German entertainer

Georg Heinrich Willem (Wim) Thoelke (9 May 1927 – 26 November 1995) was a German TV entertainer.

Wim Thoelke worked during the 1960s and 1970s for TV sport serie das aktuelle sportstudio on German channel ZDF. He was host of the TV game shows Drei mal Neun and Der große Preis in the 1970s and 1980s. Thoelke was born in Mülheim an der Ruhr. He was married and had two children. He died in Engenhahn, a district of Niedernhausen.

== Awards ==
- 1966: Goldene Kamera in category team camera for das aktuelle sportstudio.
- 1970: Bambi Award
- 1975: Goldene Kamera in category Best gameshow-moderator for Drei mal Neun and Der große Preis (3rd place Hörzu readers' choice)

== Literature ==
- Wim Thoelke: Stars, Kollegen und Ganoven – eine Art Autobiographie. Lübbe, Bergisch Gladbach 1995, ISBN 3-404-61362-7
