= Seal (surname) =

Origin
- Origin: Bengali Hindu
- Region of origin: Bengal

Seal (Bengali: শীল), also spelled Shil, Sil, Sheel is a native Bengali surname that is used by the Bengali Hindu community of India and Bangladesh. It literally means the quality of being devoted. The surname is being used by some Suvarna Banik and other communities of Bengal.

People with the surname (or a variant) include:

== In arts and media ==
- Aditya Seal (born 1988), Indian actor
- Arindam Sil (born 1964), Indian actor, producer and director
- Elizabeth Seal (born 1933), British actress
- Jaynie Seal (born 1973), Australian television presenter
- Kevin Seal, American television presenter and actor
- Manuel Seal (born 1960), American songwriter-producer
- Michael Seal (born 1970), British orchestral conductor and classical violinist

== In law and politics ==
- Barbara Seal, Canadian former judge from Montreal, Quebec
- Barry Seal (politician) (1937–2025), British politician
- Jessie Seal (born 1991), American politician
- Sudhangshu Seal (born 1945), Indian politician

== In sport ==
- David Seal (born 1972), Australian soccer player
- Jimmy Seal (born 1950), English footballer
- Mike Seal (fighter) (born 1977), Mexican mixed martial artist
- Paul Seal (born 1952), American football tight end

== In other fields ==
- Barry Seal (1939–1986), American drug smuggler and DEA informant
- Brajendra Nath Seal (1864–1938), Indian humanist philosopher and educator
- Frances Thurber Seal, American Christian Science practitioner and teacher
- Mutty Lall Seal (1792–1854), Indian Bengali businessman and philanthropist
