= Convention on the Conservation of Antarctic Marine Living Resources Ecosystem Monitoring Programme =

The Convention on the Conservation of Antarctic Marine Living Resources Ecosystem Monitoring Programme (abbreviated CEMP) is a program set up in 1985 by the Convention on the Conservation of Antarctic Marine Living Resources to monitor and record fishing and harvesting of marine life in and around Antarctica.

The goals are to: "(1) detect and record significant changes in critical components of the marine ecosystem within the Convention Area, to serve as a basis for the conservation of Antarctic marine living resources; and (2) distinguish between changes due to harvesting of commercial species and changes due to environmental variability, both physical and biological."

== Sites ==
The CEMP includes several sites, located in three "Integrated Study Regions" as well as a network of additional sites. Two sites are additionally set up for special protection, they are Seal Island and Cape Shirreff; both are located in the South Shetland Islands. Permits are required for entry within the CEMP program areas.

== See also ==
- Antarctic Specially Managed Areas
- Antarctic Specially Protected Areas
