= Sealers Passage =

Coordinates: 61°2′S 55°23′W

Sealers Passage is a marine channel between Elephant Island and the Seal Islands, in the South Shetland Islands of Antarctica. It was named by the United Kingdom Antarctic Place-Names Committee (UK-APC) in 1971. the passage is a short cut around the north coast of Elephant Island used by sealers in the 1820s.
