= Seals =

Seals may refer to:

- Pinniped, a diverse group of semi-aquatic marine mammals, many of which are commonly called seals, particularly:
  - Earless seal, or "true seal"
  - Fur seal
- Seal (emblem), a device to impress an emblem, used as a means of authentication, on paper, wax, clay or another medium (the impression is also called a seal)
  - Seals in the Sinosphere
- Seal (mechanical), a device which helps prevent leakage, contain pressure, or exclude contamination where two systems join

In military:

- United States Navy SEALs, the U.S. Navy's principal special operations force
- Royal Thai Navy SEALs, part of the Royal Thai Navy

In sport:

- Florida Seals, a minor league ice hockey team from 2002 and 2007
- San Diego Seals, a professional box lacrosse team in the National Lacrosse League, founded in 2017
- A former NHL hockey team who played under various "Seals" monikers from 1961 to 1976, including:
  - San Francisco Seals, as a minor league hockey team in the Western Hockey League from 1961 until 1967
  - California Golden Seals, as an NHL ice hockey team from 1967 to 1978
  - They additionally played as the California Seals, the Oakland Seals, and the Bay Area Seals.
- San Francisco Seals (baseball), a minor league baseball team in the Pacific Coast League from 1903 until 1957
- San Francisco Seals (soccer), an American soccer team in the USL Premier Development League from 1992 until 2008
- Victoria Seals, a professional baseball team based in Victoria, British Columbia from 2008 until 2010

Places:

- Seals, Georgia, United States
- Seal's Rock, Lundy, Devonshire, England

Other:

- Seals (surname)
- "SEALS", the South East Academic Libraries System
- "Seals", an episode of the television series Teletubbies
- Southeast Asian Linguistics Society (SEALS)

== See also ==
- Seal (disambiguation)
- Seale (disambiguation)
- Seven seals (disambiguation)
- Sealing (disambiguation)
- Seals and Crofts, American music duo
- Seals of the U.S. states, their insignia
- SEAL Team (TV series)
