= De septem sigillis =

De septem sigillis (On the Seven Seals) is the name of several works:

- De septem sigillis (9th century), treatise falsely attributed to Alcuin
- De septem sigillis (1190s), treatise usually attributed to Joachim of Fiore
- De septem sigillis (c. 1227), treatise of Benedict of Bari

== See also ==
- Seven Seals
