= Seale =

Seale may refer to:

- Seale, Alabama, an unincorporated community in the United States
- Seale, Surrey, a village in England
- Seale Hayne College, military hospital in Ivybridge, Devon, UK

Seale is also a surname:

- Seale Baronets (since 1838), noble family
- Charles Seale-Hayne (1833–1903), British member of Parliament from 1885 to 1903
- Alvin Seale (1871–1958), American ichthyologist
- Arthur Seale (born 1946), convicted murderer
- Bobby Seale (born 1937), American civil rights activist
- Clive Seale (born 1955), British medical sociologist
- Douglas Seale (1913–1999), British actor
- James Ford Seale (1936–2011), Ku Klux Klan member
- John Seale (born 1942), Australian cinematographer
- Patrick Seale (1930–2014), British journalist
- Shonte Seale (born 1999), Barbadian netball player
- William Seale (1939–2019), American historian and author

== See also ==
- Seal (disambiguation)
- Seals (disambiguation)
- Searles
