= Liederbach (Main) =

River in Germany

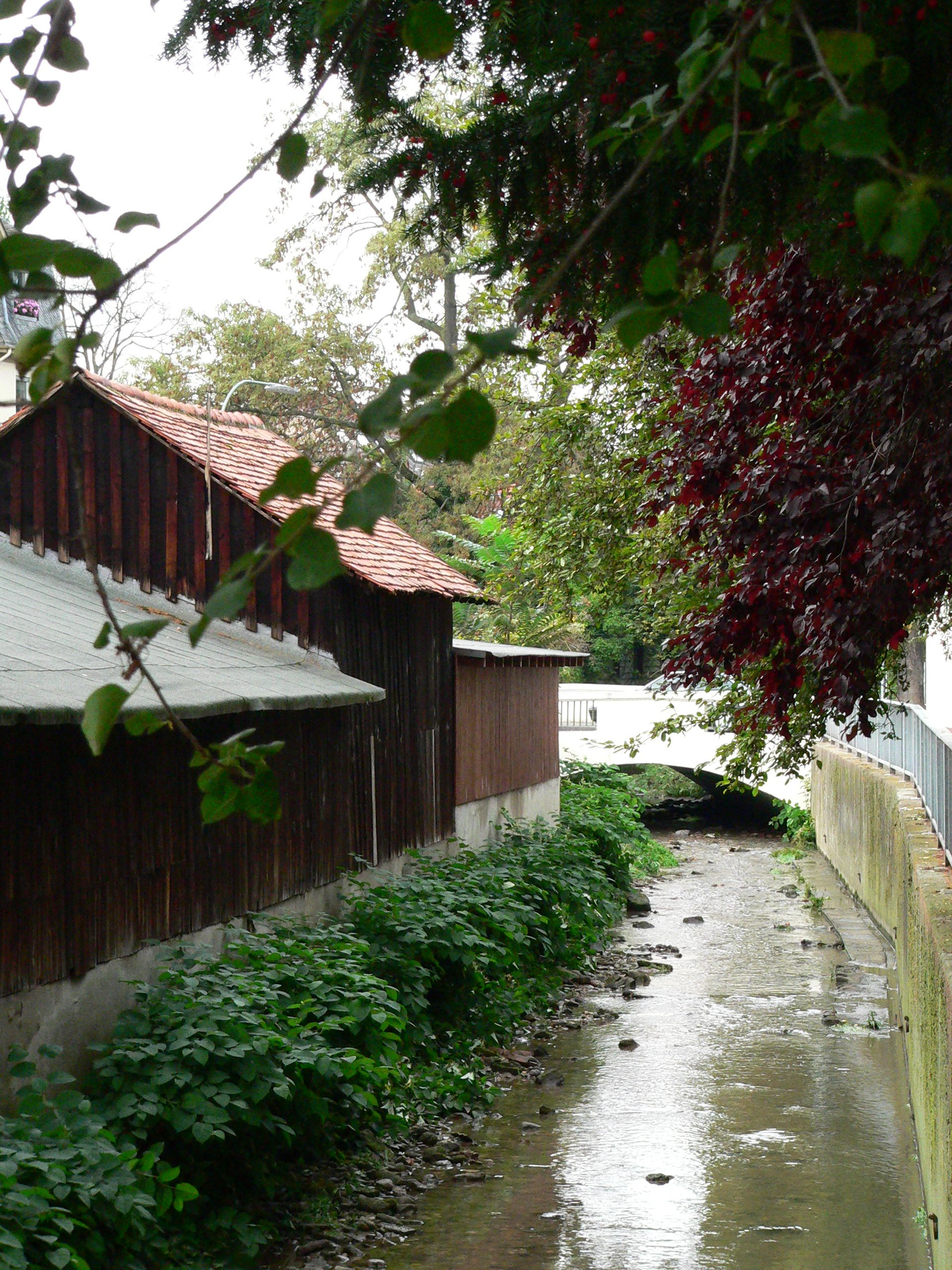

Location
- Country: Germany
- State: Hesse

Physical characteristics
- Mouth
  - location: Main
  - coordinates: 50°05′38″N 8°32′38″E
- Length: 20.2 km (12.6 mi)

Basin features
- Progression: Main→ Rhine→ North Sea

Liederbach (in its upper course: Reichenbach) is a river of Hesse, Germany. It is a right tributary of the Main near Höchst.

== See also ==
- List of rivers of Hesse
