= History of Höchst am Main =

The town of Höchst am Main, now the Höchst district of Frankfurt, has a history stretching back over twelve hundred years. For a long time, Höchst was an independent town and an outpost of the Kurmainz region at the gates of Frankfurt. It was not incorporated into Frankfurt until 1928.

== Geographical classification ==
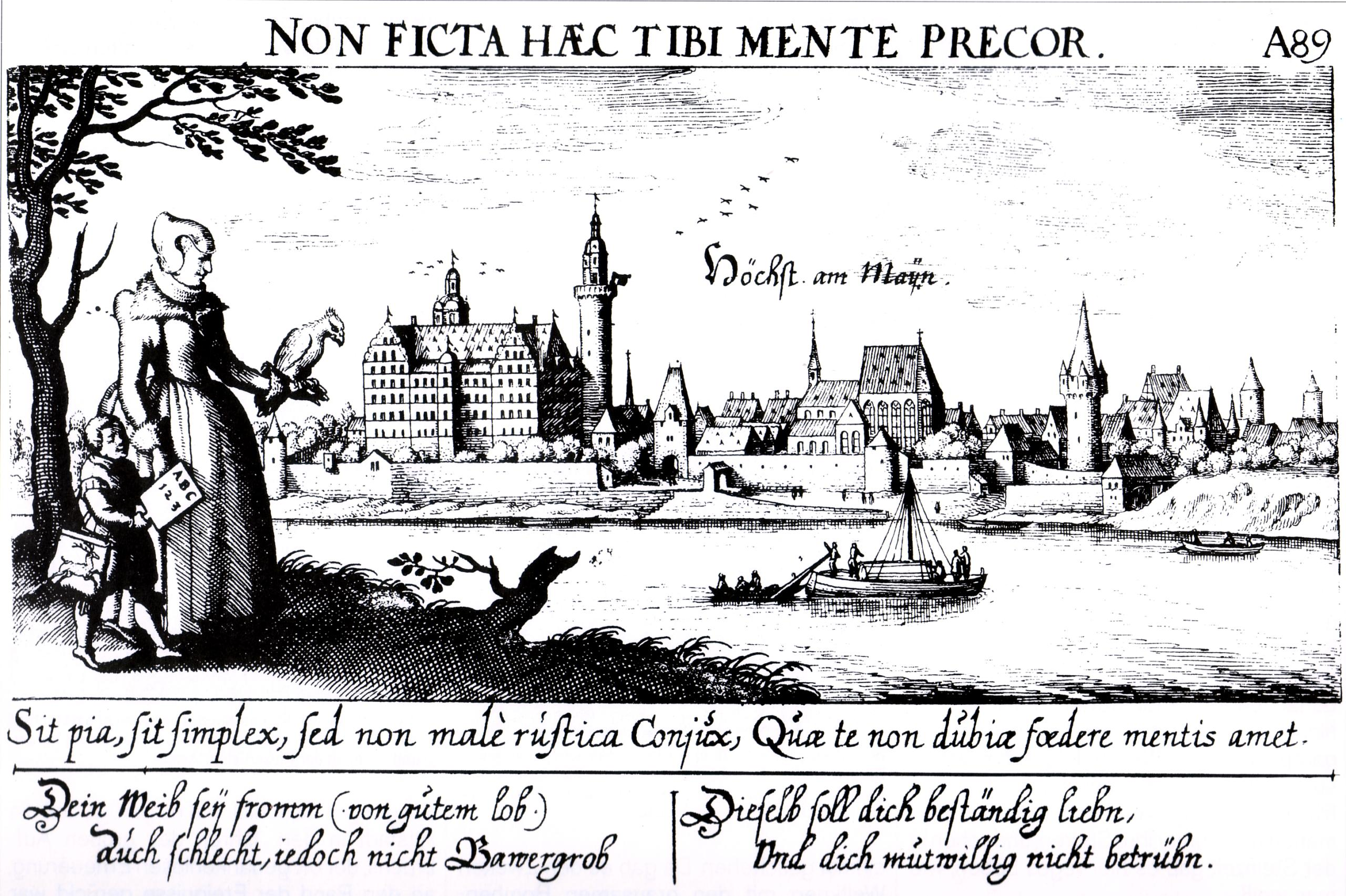
Höchst am Main with castle, Justinus Church and town fortifications in 1625. Engraving by Daniel Meisner from the "Thesaurus philopoliticus"

Höchst was built at the crossroads of prehistoric transportation routes. Immediately after the Nidda flows into the Main, two navigable rivers at the time, a slope edge pushes almost right up to the riverbank. The plateau is flood-proof and was easy to defend. At the foot of the slope, a ford led through the Main, while a pre-Roman old road, the Antsanvia or Hohe Straße, a forerunner of the later Elisabethenstraße, led from the mouth of the Main near Kastel via Höchst to the Vogelsberg. Starting from the mouth of the Niddam, the Lindenweg (also known as the Linienweg), a pre-Roman, straightforward connection over the Taunus crossing at today's Saalburg, led into the Lahn region. North of Sossenheim, the old trade route, the Hessian Wine Route (Wagenstraße), branched off into the Wetterau.

== Pre- and early history ==
Individual finds of tools and worked pieces of antler from the end of the Upper Palaeolithic in the area of the old town of Höchst suggest that the area of Höchst was already occasionally inhabited by people at this time. However, there is no evidence of a permanent settlement.

It was not until the beginning of the Neolithic period that a permanent human settlement in the area of the Old Town, Höchster Neustadt and Oberfeld can be established. Remains of settlements and pottery shards from the Linear Pottery and Bell Beaker cultures were found during construction work and excavations.

Burial mounds and urn fields from the Bronze Age provide evidence of ongoing human settlement in the Höchster area. Iron Age graves from the Hallstatt and La Tène periods were also found during construction work, indicating Celtic inhabitants. However, there is no evidence of an oppidum, just as there is no evidence of a fixed settlement structure in the sense of a village.

== Roman and pre-Franconian period ==
Shortly after the turn of the millennium, the Romans built a fort on the high bank above the Main. There is no exact proof, but it is possible that a bridge spanned the shallow Main at the Wörthspitze near the mouth of the Niddam and connected the Roman settlement with the southern Main areas around the present-day towns of Kelsterbach and Groß-Gerau.

The Romans extended existing Celtic roads and created numerous new connections: The Lindenweg or Linienweg to Saalburg or the Taunus crossing there, the Weinstrasse via this after the Elisabethenstrasse crossing to Wetterau, the Hohe Strasse on the Main / Nidda watershed to Vogelsberg and Thuringia. The Königsteiner Straße still runs in a north-westerly direction to the Feldberg, and the route along the course of the Main can be found after the Nidda bridge as a connection via Griesheim and the Gutleuthof to Frankfurt. Today, these are Nieder Kirchweg and Stroofstraße.

A river port was established at the protected mouth of the Nidda, and a military brickworks was built on the northern bank of the Nidda in what is now Nieder Gemarkung. Legio XXII Primigenia produced bricks here between the years 85 and 120. With the further construction of the Limes in the middle of the 2nd century, brick production, which had been temporarily discontinued, was resumed. More than 200 different brick stamps have been preserved, most of them from the XXII legion.

The settlement lost its economic and military importance with the construction of the Elisabethenstraße via Hofheim and the construction of the Limes. It developed into a civilian settlement. When the Alamanni overcame the Limes from 260 onwards and invaded Roman territory, the Romans retreated to their territories on the left bank of the Rhine and gave up their possessions on the right bank. The settlement at the mouth of the Niddam became deserted, and there are no records or reports of the Höchster area being repopulated after the Romans withdrew. Only a few indications point to an Alemannic farmstead in the 4th century and a Merovingian royal court on the edge of today's old town in the 5th century.

== Under the crosier: The Mainz period – 790 to 1803 ==
=== The village of Höchst in the early and High Middle Ages ===
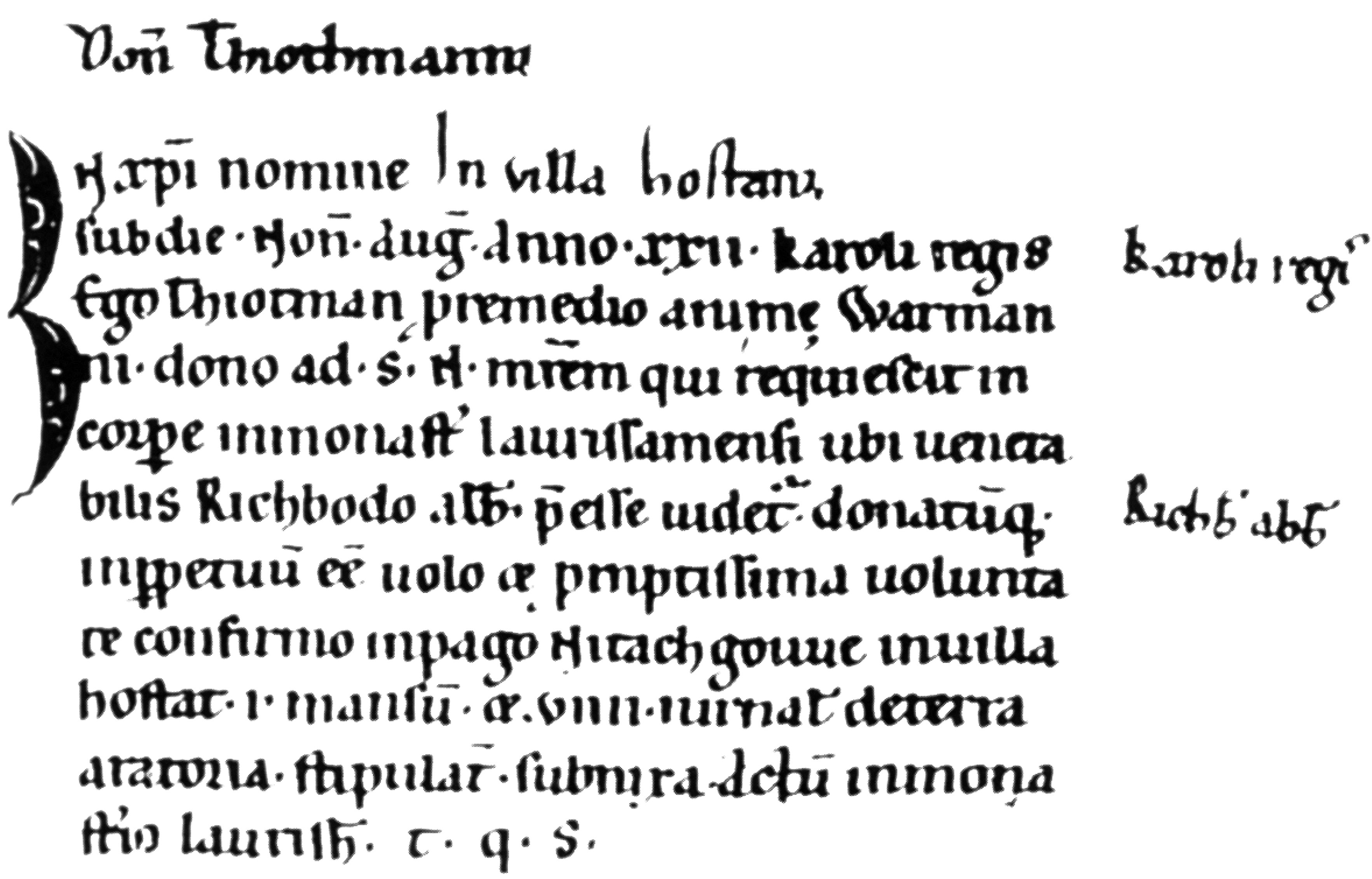
First mention of the villa hostat. Excerpt from the Lorsch Codex (12th century) with the document text from 790.

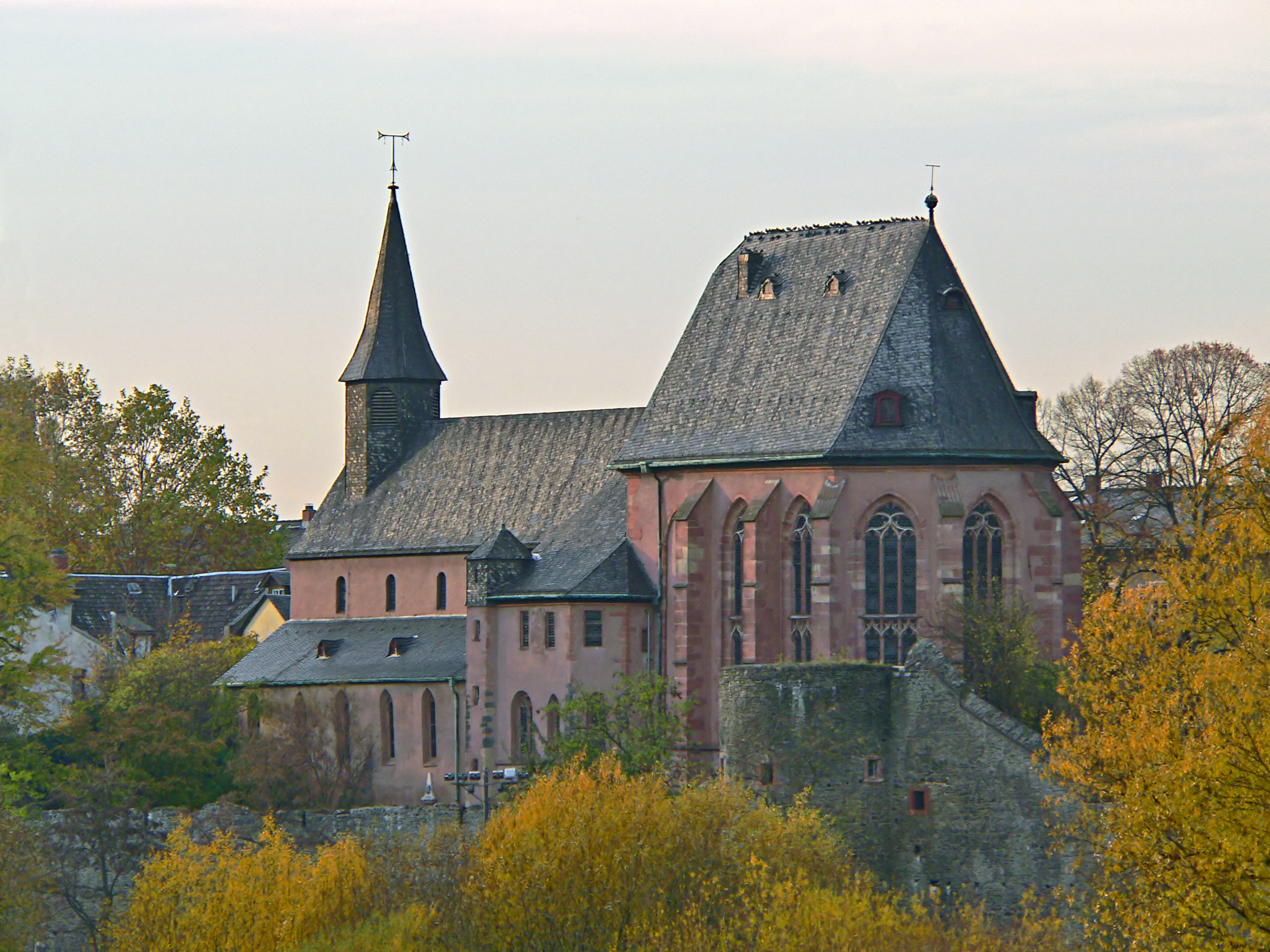
The Höchst Justinuskirche in its present form with Carolingian basilica and Gothic choir

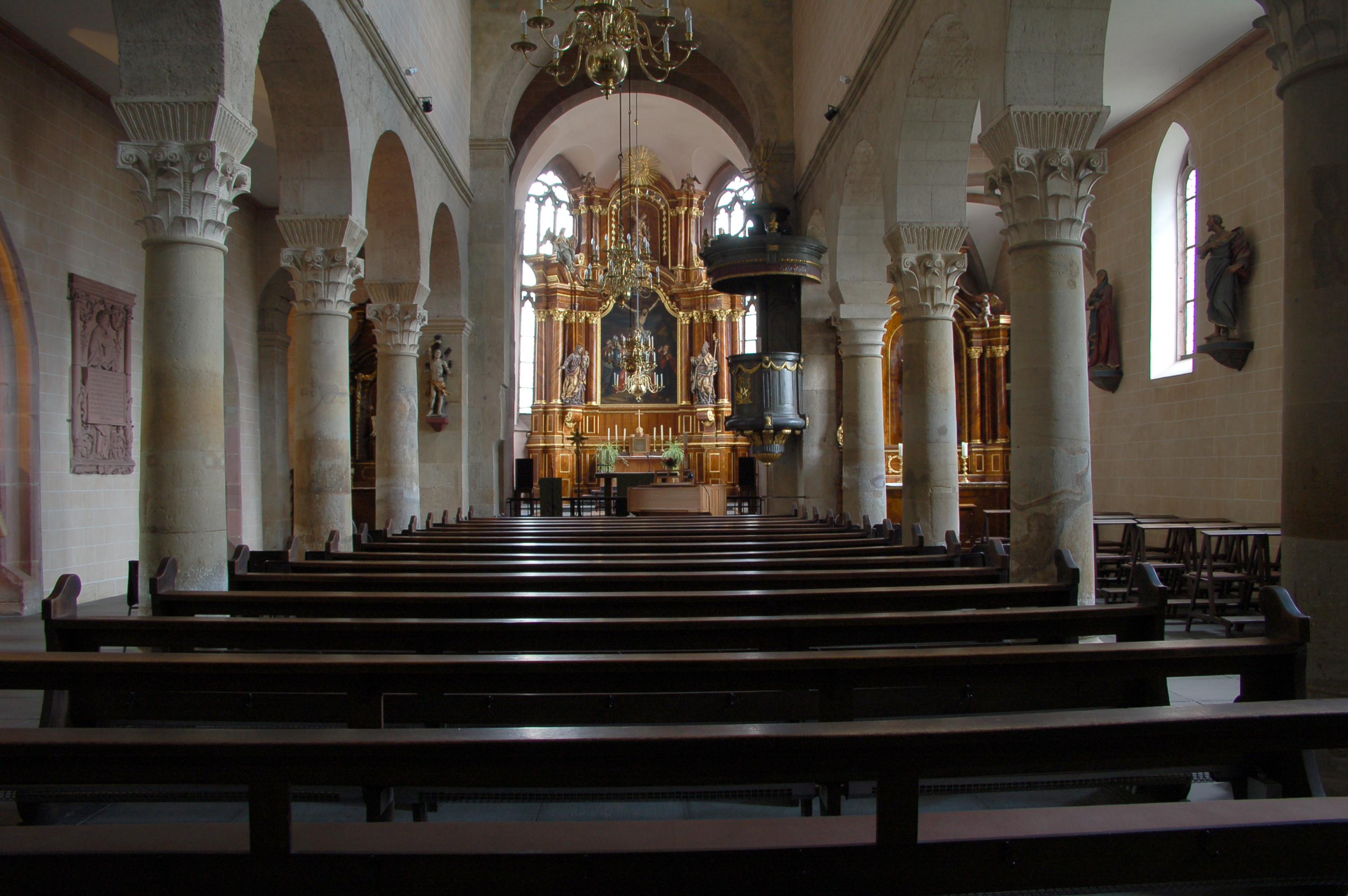
The Carolingian nave of St. Justin's Church

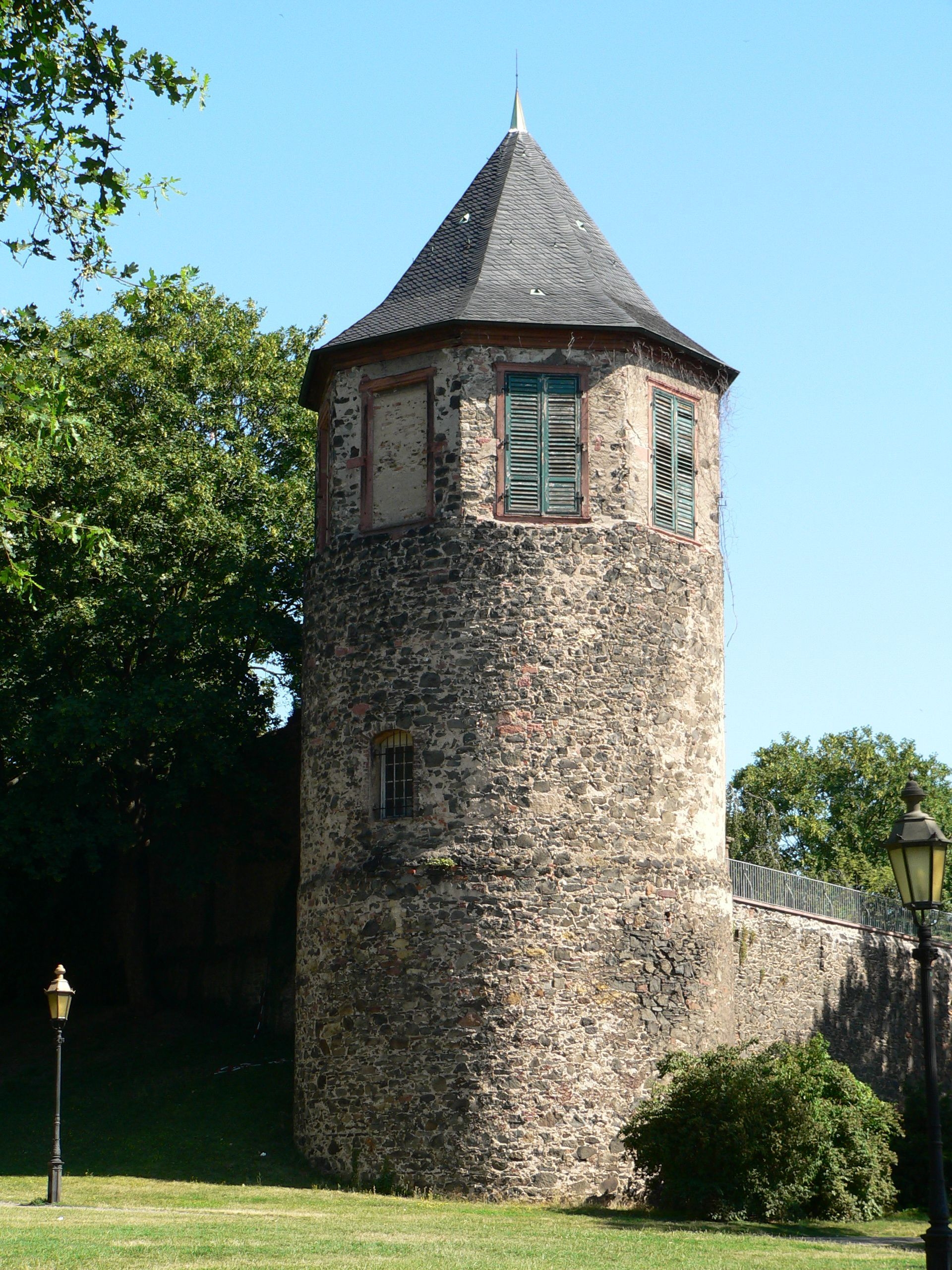
The Höchster Ochsenturm from the 13th century

It was not until the 8th century that there is evidence of a settlement of farmsteads on the high plateau above the Nidda. However, there can be no talk of a village in the modern sense; it was rather a loose collection of individual farmsteads. The first documented mention of this settlement was on August 5, 790 in the Lorsch Codex, when the Frankish lord of the manor Thiotmann donated an estate in villa hostat in Nitahgowe, in the "village on the high site in the Niddagau", to Lorsch Monastery. In later times, the Renaissance poet Georg Calaminus wrote down the Hostato legend in verse, according to which the squire Hostato was the only one to survive the Battle of Roncesvalles and was therefore knighted by Charlemagne as thanks for his bravery and appointed bailiff of the high place.

By the early 9th century at the latest, the Archbishopric of Mainz, which was striving to expand its territorial rule, had amassed so many individual privileges under Frankish law in the areas along the Main from Mainz to Frankfurt that Höchst was part of the Mainz possessions and no longer belonged to the Niddagau. Annals of the Fulda monastery from the year 849 report on the "Höchst estate in the Mainz region". The rule of Mainz lasted for almost a thousand years until 1803, and the Mainz wheel in the Höchst coat of arms is still a reminder of this today.

From around 830, Archbishop Otgar of Mainz had St. Justin's Church built on the high bank above the River Main, which is still largely intact today. It is one of the oldest churches in Germany and the oldest building in Frankfurt. The church, which was far too large for the settlement, was a symbol of power for the Archbishop of Mainz vis-à-vis the Frankfurt royal court. At the same time, as part of the church's settlement policy, it served to promote the development of a village settlement and concentration of the population, who had previously lived in scattered individual farmsteads, around the church. Otgar's successor Rabanus Maurus consecrated the building after its completion in 850. The Justinus Church served as the village church. Subsequently, the village of Höchst developed along the main road between a Mainz Fronhof in the west, which was located in the area of the Wed, and the Justinuskirche in the east. The western border of Höchst is formed by a branch of the Liederbach, which flowed to the Main via the area of today's Schloßplatz. At the beginning of the 11th century, it was possible to speak of a village of Höchst.

The development of another archiepiscopal court to the west of Justinuskirche has been recorded from the 11th century. Together with St. Justin's Church, it was donated to St. Alban's Monastery in Mainz. The church was specifically described in the monastery's writings as being in danger of collapsing; in this way, St. Alban's received further land and privileges in Höchst as a gift. However, no renovation work was carried out on the supposedly dilapidated church. The Höchst branch of St. Alban's Abbey remained in Höchst until 1419.

In the 12th century, the diocese of Mainz appointed a burgrave in Höchst; Count Gotfried von der Wartburg, a relative of Archbishop Henry I, is mentioned in documents. Such a governor usually had his seat in a town or castle. Höchst was not yet a town at this time, so it can be concluded from the proven existence of a bailiff that a castle already existed in the middle of the 12th century as the predecessor of today's Höchst Castle. During excavation work on the castle terrace in 1981, trenches were found which, due to their different orientation, could not have belonged to the – proven – later Gothic customs castle.

The Mainz toll levied in Höchst and other towns on the Lower Main was abolished and banned by Emperor Frederick Barbarossa in 1157. Only three places, Frankfurt, Aschaffenburg and Neustadt, were still allowed to collect river customs duties. With the decline of imperial power in the 13th century, the Electorate of Mainz was once again able to levy customs duties in Höchst. A new and larger castle was built, which had a high, almost five meter thick shield wall on the land side. The result of the castle construction was a modest expansion of Höchst to the west. When the moat was excavated, the deeply cut mouth of the Liederbach was filled in, the castle square was largely raised to its present level and the water was channelled directly into the moat.

New buildings were constructed to the north and east of the castle square between the end of the 13th and the beginning of the 14th century. The Allmeygang, which had previously led directly to the Main, was diverted to the new square. To the west of the castle stood the Ochsenturm as a free-standing watchtower, which was later incorporated into the town fortifications built in the 15th century.

=== Town elevation and urban development in the late Middle Ages ===
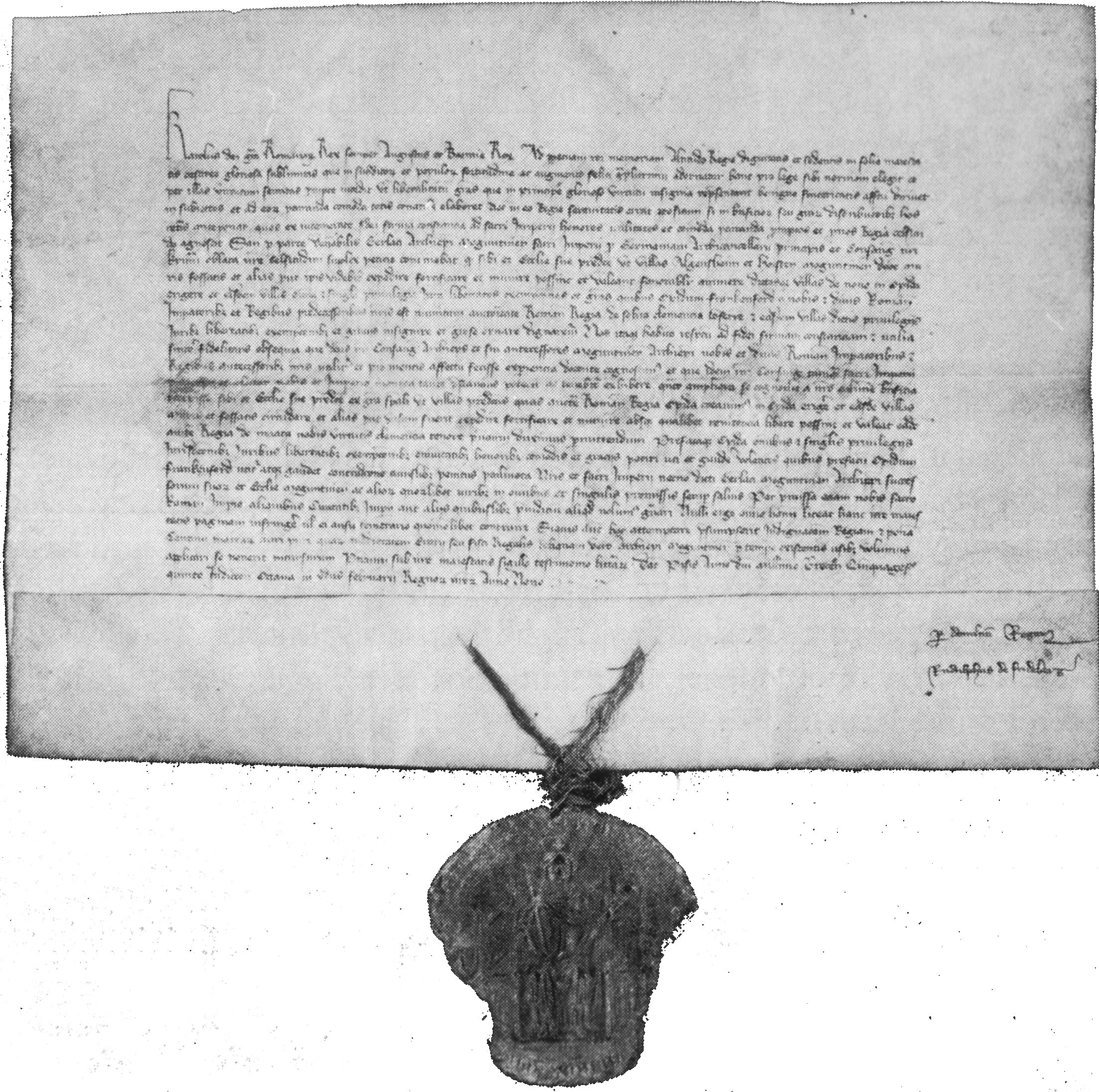
Charter of February 11, 1355, for the villages of Algensheim (Gau-Algesheim) and Hoisten

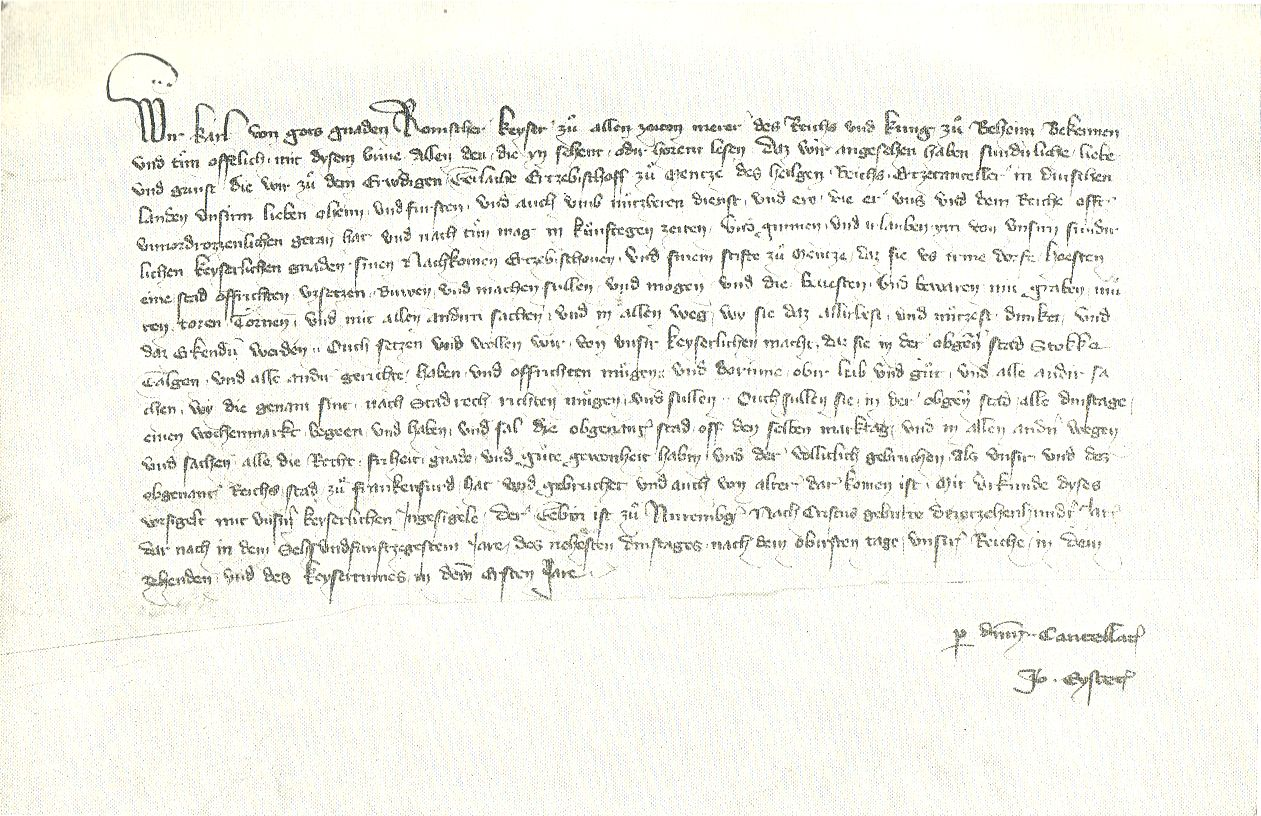
City charter dated January 12, 1356 (complete document text on the image description page)

The elevation of Höchst was a point of contention between Mainz and Frankfurt for a long time. The main issue was the levying of the Mainz toll by the archbishops of Mainz, for whom the toll was an important source of income. Frankfurt, on the other hand, regarded the Mainz customs duty at Höchst as an obstacle to trade and repeatedly obtained its prohibition by the emperor. Nevertheless, the people of Mainz often continued to levy the Mainz tolls without bothering about the bans. During the interregnum with its weakened royal power, this usually had no consequences. In 1336, Emperor Ludwig IV of Bavaria granted Frankfurt a privilege that forbade the construction of any fortifications within a seven-mile radius of Frankfurt. This was intended to prevent Höchst from being fortified.

On February 11, 1355, Emperor Charles IV granted the village of Hoisten (Höchst) city rights against Frankfurt's will in a document issued in Pisa. The document, written in Latin, was addressed to Gerlach von Nassau, the sovereign and Archbishop of Mainz. For a long time, there were doubts about the legality of this document, as it was allegedly neither sealed nor signed. However, the document kept in the Bavarian Main State Archives in Munich bears both the royal and imperial seal and is therefore valid.

In another document issued in German in Nuremberg on January 12, 1356, which is also kept in the Bavarian Main State Archives in Munich, Charles IV reaffirmed the elevation of the city:

We grant and allow him by our special imperial grace, his descendants, [...] that they shall and may erect a town out of their village Hoesten, and build and make it, and fortify and arm it with moats, gates, towers and all other things and with all roads, ...

Charles also significantly extended Höchst's city rights and granted the young city market rights. As in the first charter, the city was granted privileges of freedom along the lines of the neighboring city of Frankfurt:

They shall also celebrate and hold a weekly market in the above-mentioned city every Tuesday, and the above-mentioned city shall have and make full use of all the rights and freedoms, grace and good customs on the same market day and in all other ways and matters, as our and the above-mentioned kingdom's city of Franckenfurt has and uses and has done from time immemorial.

As Mainz's daughter city at the gates of Frankfurt, Höchst thus became an important instrument for Mainz in the competition between the two major cities. At the same time, the Archbishops of Mainz were appointed as Chancellors of Germany under the Golden Bull and had the privilege of assembling the electors to elect a king.

The granting of the city charter strengthened Mainz's rights on the Lower Main against the up-and-coming imperial city of Frankfurt, and the right to fortify also gave Mainz a stronger military presence in Höchst. The previously unprotected settlement and the Mainz Fronhof were now better protected against raids. Thanks to the city fortifications, the Frankfurt-Mainz trade route ran through the protected city area, which meant that land customs duties could also be levied. The revenue from the customs duties in Höchst, Ehrenfels and Niederlahnstein was a welcome instrument for the financially weak Mainz state to share in the growing wealth of its neighbors.

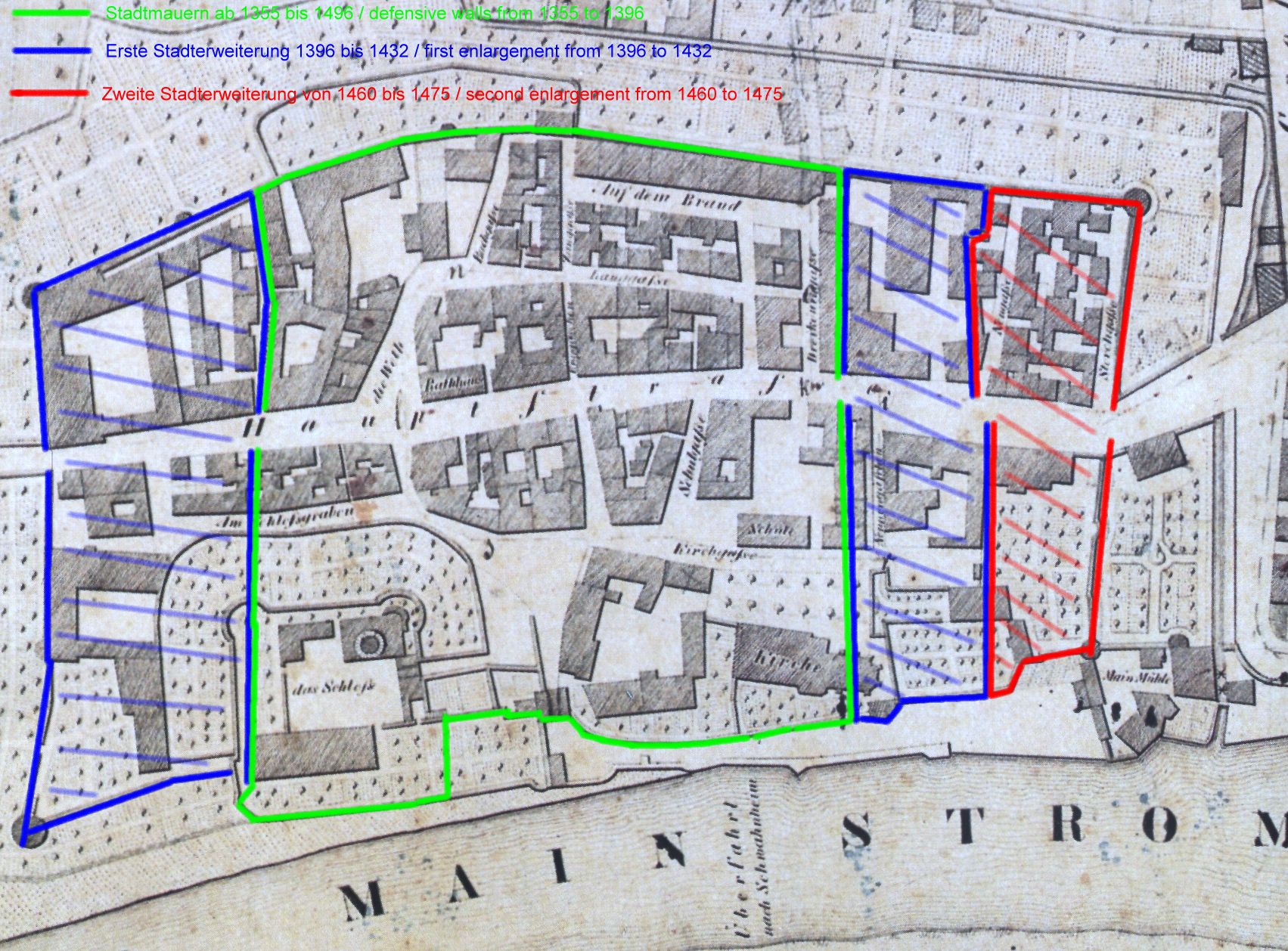
Overview of city wall construction and expansion between 1355 and 1475, based on a section of the city map from 1850. The layout of the old town had not changed since the Middle Ages.

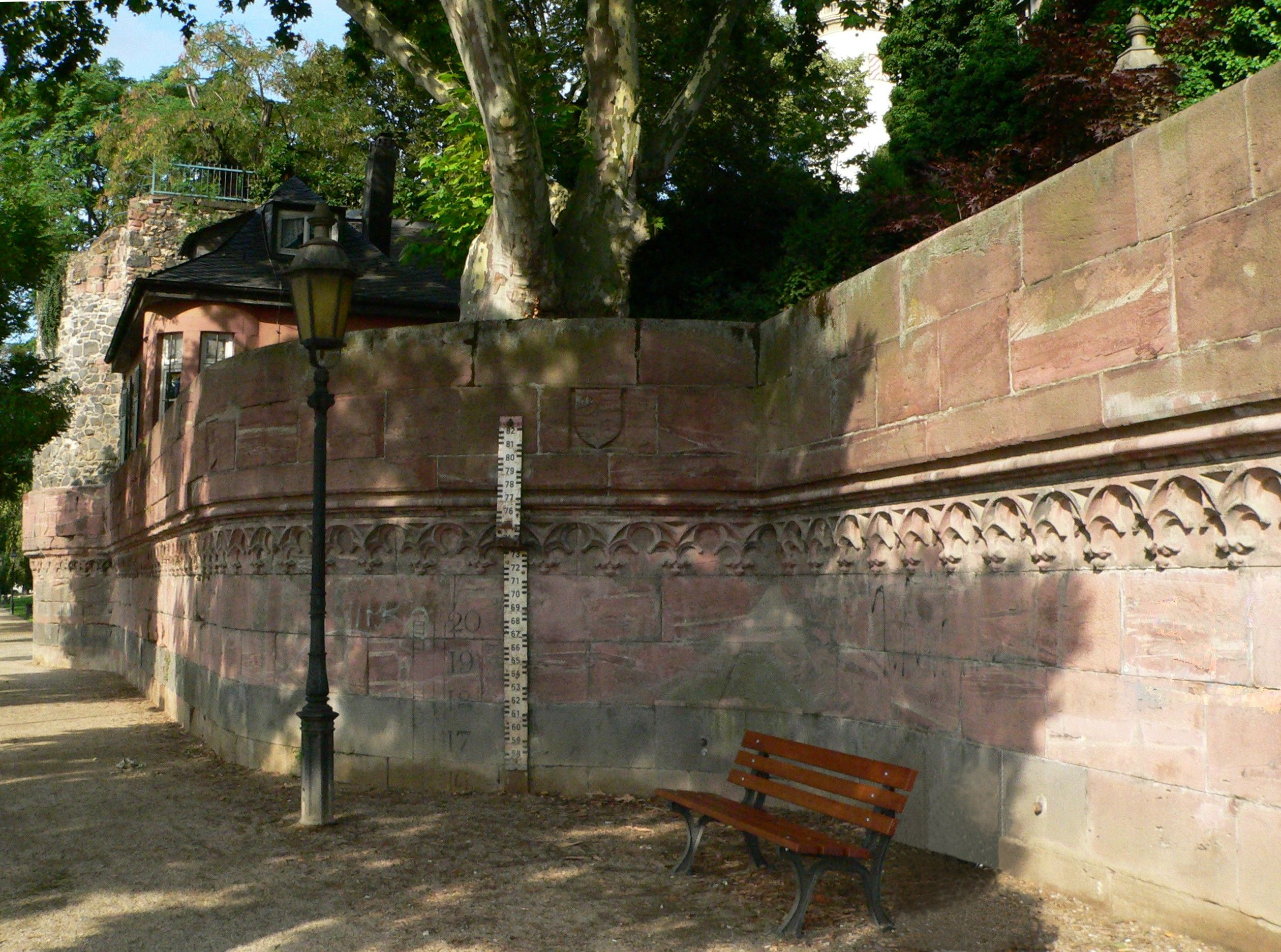
Part of the Gothic Höchster town wall from the early 15th century with the coat of arms of Diether von Isenburg. Approx. 2 m of the wall is invisible in the ground, the fill dates from the construction of the Höchster harbor in 1908.

Strengthening the bourgeoisie with the elevation of Höchst was not in the interests of the archbishop, who had already had to grant the citizens of Mainz considerable freedoms. The citizens of Höchst were granted municipal freedoms by the elevation of the city, but no self-government. Mainz did not set up a council and the mayor was also appointed by the archbishops. The town of Höchst was to provide customs revenue and secure the eastern border of the Mainz state militarily. Peasant serfdom was replaced by other duties such as guard duty on the town walls.

Shortly after the town was raised, the construction of a town fortification began in Höchst. The town wall, which has been partially preserved to this day, was probably built in several stages. The Limburg Chronicle does not mention a stone wall in the report on the Frankfurt attack of 1396, but rather palisades with ditches and towers:

It should also be known that Höchst was only established as a small town and freedom forty years ago, with a moat, planks and keeps, as is proper.

Initially, the town extended from Rosengasse in the west to the later Kronberger Haus in the east. Only at the end of the 15th century, after two extensions, did it reach the extent of the existing city wall in the east and west.

The customs duty levied by the Mainzer in Höchst on all ships sailing on the Main remained a point of contention between the Mainzer and the Frankfurters, as the trading city of Frankfurt saw its most important lifeline threatened by the Mainz toll. In 1368, the customs duty was raised again, banned once more in 1379 and the Main was declared duty-free as far as Frankfurt. In 1380, King Wenceslas finally allowed Archbishop Adolf I of Nassau and his successors to levy a duty on wine and other merchant goods. In 1396, the people of Frankfurt therefore took advantage of the vacancy of the Mainz bishop's see; on behalf of the Frankfurt council, the Cronberg knights destroyed the town and Höchst Castle in a coup d'état. Between 1396 and 1432, the castle and town fortifications were rebuilt step by step, against which Frankfurt sued in vain. The interplay between permission and prohibition, collection and renunciation of the Höchst customs duty also continued.

The settlement of several noble families in Höchst, who alternately occupied the post of Mainz bailiff, led to spatial and economic growth. After its destruction in 1396, the town was extended in both directions along the main street until 1432. In the west, the older Ochsenturm tower was incorporated into the new fortifications as the south-western corner. Town gates were built along the main street.

The monastery of St. Alban, which had previously provided pastoral care in the Justinuskirche, was dissolved in 1419. The monastery property was therefore transferred to the Antonite Order in 1441, which moved its monastery in Roßdorf near Hanau to Höchst. The Antonite monks added a Gothic choir to the Justinuskirche, which still characterizes the appearance of the building today. The last Antonites left Höchst in 1803 after secularization.

In 1463, Diether von Isenburg, who was defeated in the Mainz Collegiate Feud and deposed as Archbishop, was granted the office of Höchst as his own dominion in the Peace of Zeilsheim. Until Diether became archbishop again in 1475, he had the castle and town of Höchst expanded. In a further construction phase from 1460 to 1475, the town was once again expanded to the east; the widening of the street in front of the Frankfurter Tor, known as the Storch, served as a new square for the Höchst weekly market. During this expansion, the fortified Mainmühle was incorporated into the fortifications as a new south-eastern corner.

=== Höchst in the early modern period until the end of the Electorate of Mainz ===
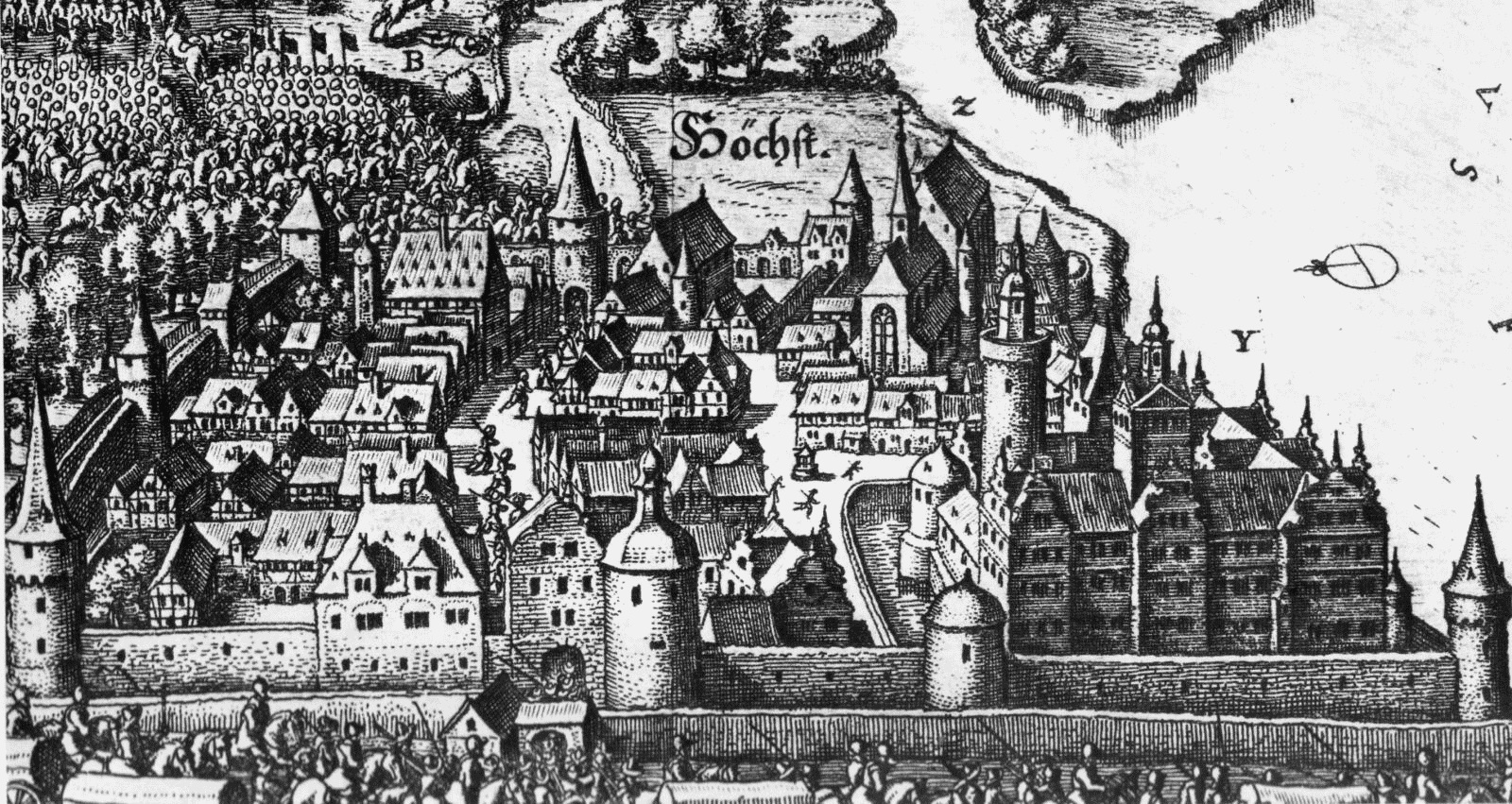
Höchst, detail from an engraving by Merian on the Battle of Höchst, 1622

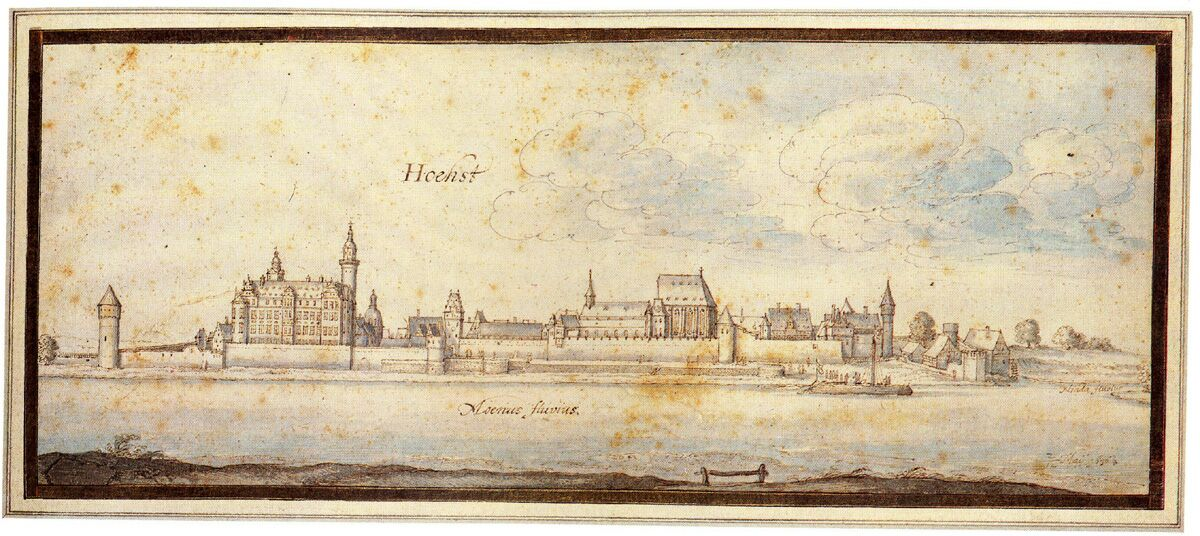
Höchst in 1636 with Ochsenturm, castle, Main Gate, town fortifications and Justinus Church, watercolor pen and ink drawing by Wenzel Hollar, 1636

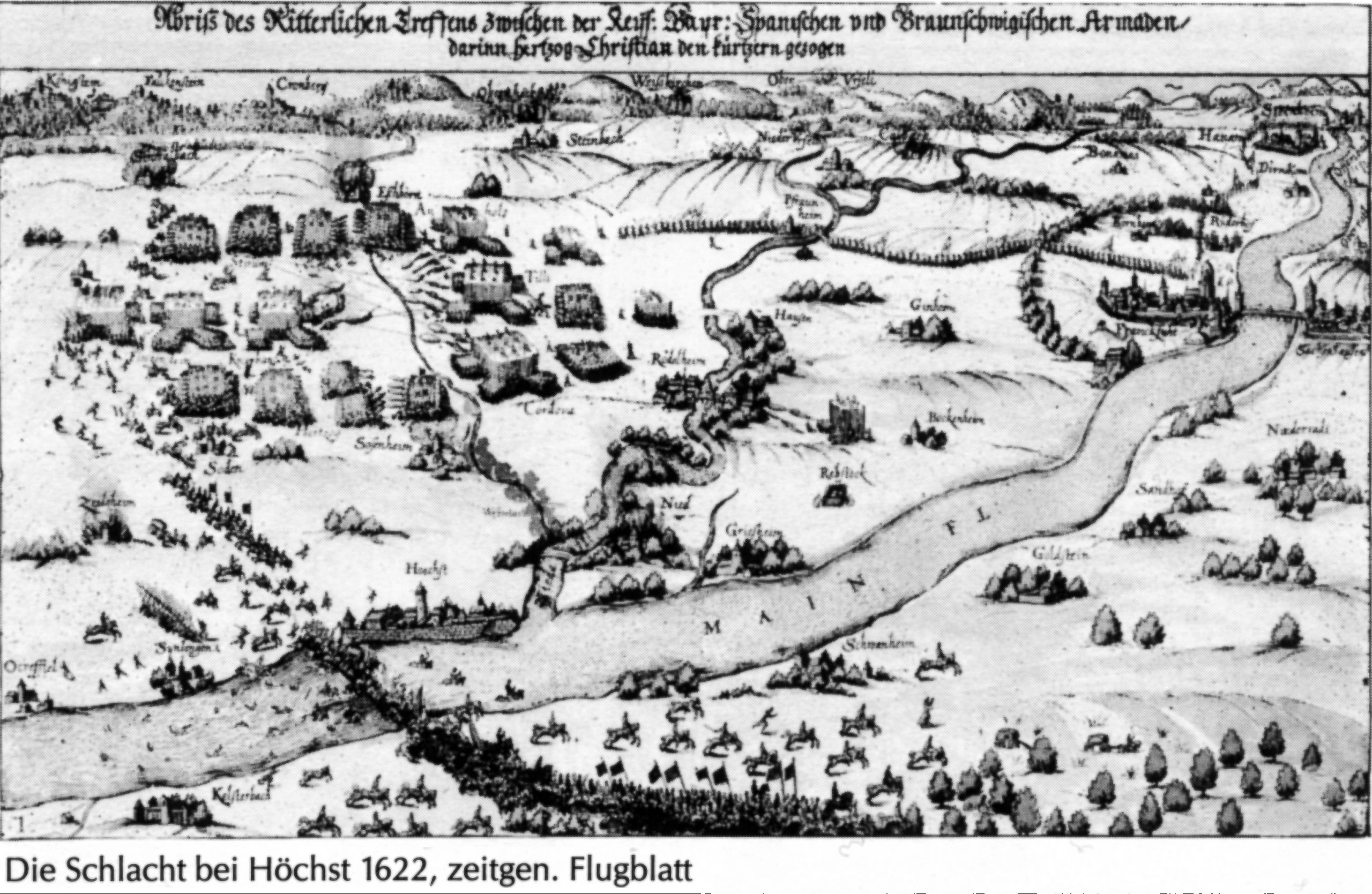
The Battle of Höchst in a contemporary engraving: "Östreichischer Lorbeerkrantz", Nicolaus Bellus, 1625

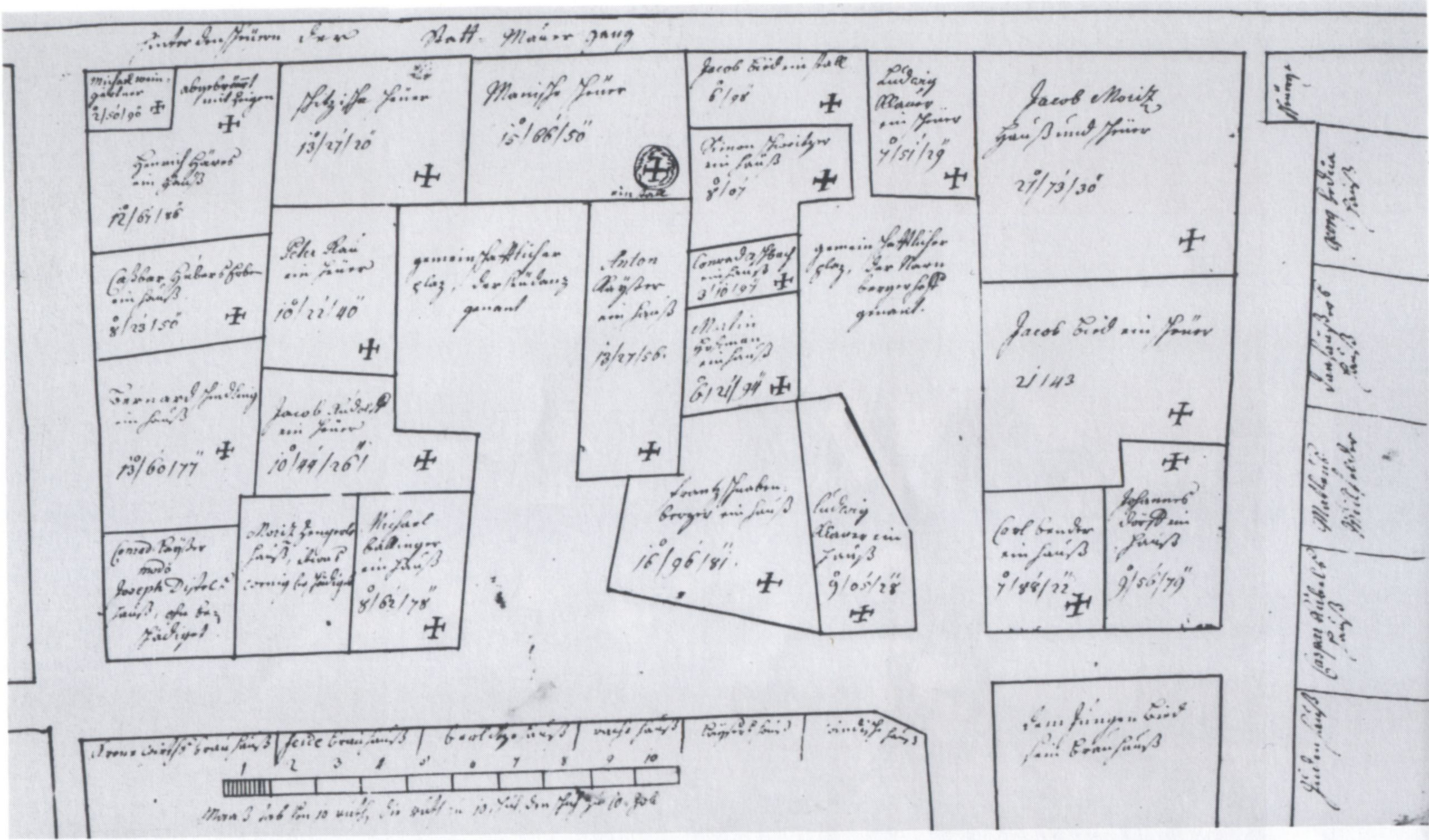
Fire damage survey in Höchster Altstadt between Albanusstraße and Kronengasse from 1779

During the Renaissance period, Höchst slowly developed into a small-town sub-center to the west of Frankfurt. From the middle of the 16th century, some of the aristocratic residences that still exist today were built, such as the Kronberger Haus, the Dalberger Haus and the Greiffenclausche Haus. As archbishop and sovereign, Wolfgang von Dalberg had the palace further extended from 1586.

Höchst was struck by the plague in 1582. The number of plague deaths is not recorded, only the Antonite diary reports four victims among the friars. On the night of December 10/11, half of the town was destroyed in the Great Fire. The Antonite diary records this:

1586 Högst branded in Vigilia Damasi; the Main was frozen for 5 weeks.

The Thirty Years' War was also a turning point for Höchst. The town was severely affected by the events of the war. On June 20, 1622, the Battle of Höchst was fought, in which the Imperial forces under Tilly defeated the Brunswickers. The town was occupied and plundered. From November 1631 to March 1632, the Swedes under Gustav II Adolf occupied the city, with a small Swedish garrison remaining until the end of 1634. On his march from Frankfurt towards Mainz, Bernhard von Weimar had Höchst captured in January 1635 and half of the city and the then Gothic castle burnt down. Elector Anselm Casimir Wambolt von Umstadt complained about this to the Emperor in a letter dated March of that year:

But out of evil intent and poisonous envy, without any benefit or advantage to themselves, they reduced the residential palace built with great cost by our predecessor Wolfgang to ashes, especially down to the walls that were still standing.

The town was repeatedly ravaged by enemy troops. Fires, famine and plague decimated the population. Of the 126 families in 1618, only 75 remained at the end of the war. However, the number of households rose again to 102 due to new arrivals. The town was slow to recover from the consequences of the war and the destroyed castle was not rebuilt. Only the gate building and the keep were repaired between 1636 and 1768. The tower was given its baroque dome in 1681.

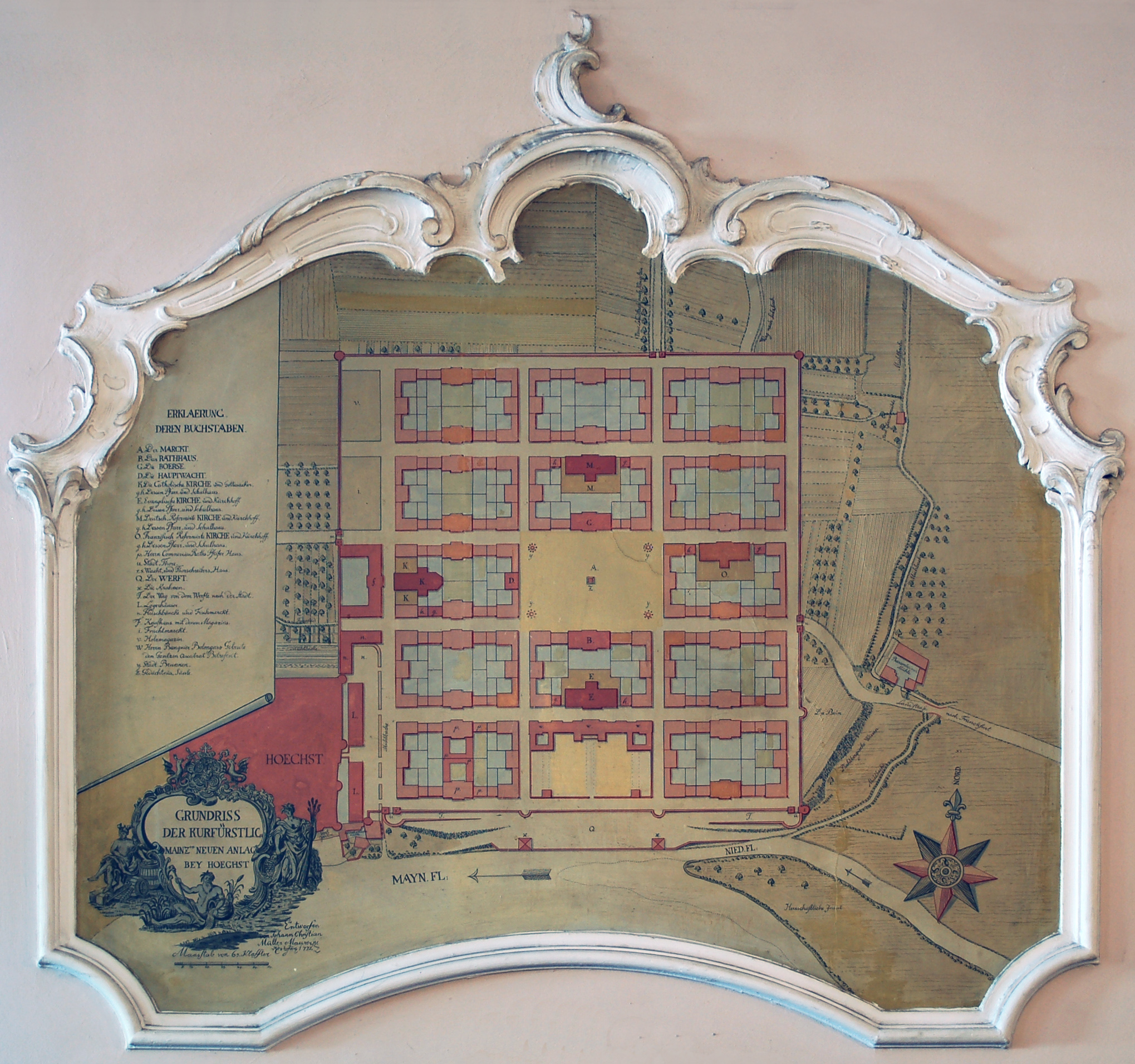
Ideal plan of Höchster Neustadt. Mural in the Bolongaro Palace

In the 18th century, trade slowly began to flourish in Höchst. The population slowly increased with the economic upturn, doubling to 850 by 1780 compared to 450 in 1668. The founding of the famous Höchst porcelain manufactory in 1746 – it produced until 1796 and was re-established in 1947 – and the settlement of the Italian trading family Bolongaro were two important reasons for this upturn. The Bolongaros had acquired a Frankfurt tobacco shop in 1743 and developed it into the largest snuff manufactory in Europe. In 1771, they acquired citizenship in Höchst, which the Lutheran imperial city of Frankfurt had denied them. Elector Emmerich Joseph allowed them to build the Bolongaro Palace as part of his Neustadt project for the urban development of Höchst, which began in 1768. However, progress on the project was slow. Although the new settlers were granted many privileges, the construction costs on the difficult terrain were high and there was plenty of cheap building land available in the old town. As a result, the new town remained undeveloped apart from a few streets.

On September 24, 1778, the Old Town was once again hit by a fire that destroyed the north-eastern quarter. As a result, the buildings there were reorganized to reduce the risk of fire. At the same time, the Elector allowed the buildings to be built right up to the city wall. This meant the end of the city wall as a defensive structure for the city. The Bolongaros, who had been granted Frankfurt citizenship after all in 1783, left Höchst again and entrusted their authorized signatory Bertina with the management of the tobacco manufactory.

In the following years from 1792, Höchst was occupied several times by French troops during the Coalition Wars. In September 1795, a French army under Marshal Jourdan crossed the Rhine at Mainz-Kastel, but was defeated by the Austrians under Karl von Clerfayt in the Battle of Höchst on October 10, 1795, and thrown back across the Rhine. On October 11, 1802, one hundred men of the Nassau military under the leadership of Government Councillor Huth took possession of Höchst in anticipation of the territorial reorganization.

== From Nassau and Prussia to Frankfurt – 1803 to 1928 ==
=== The Biedermeier district town in Nassau ===
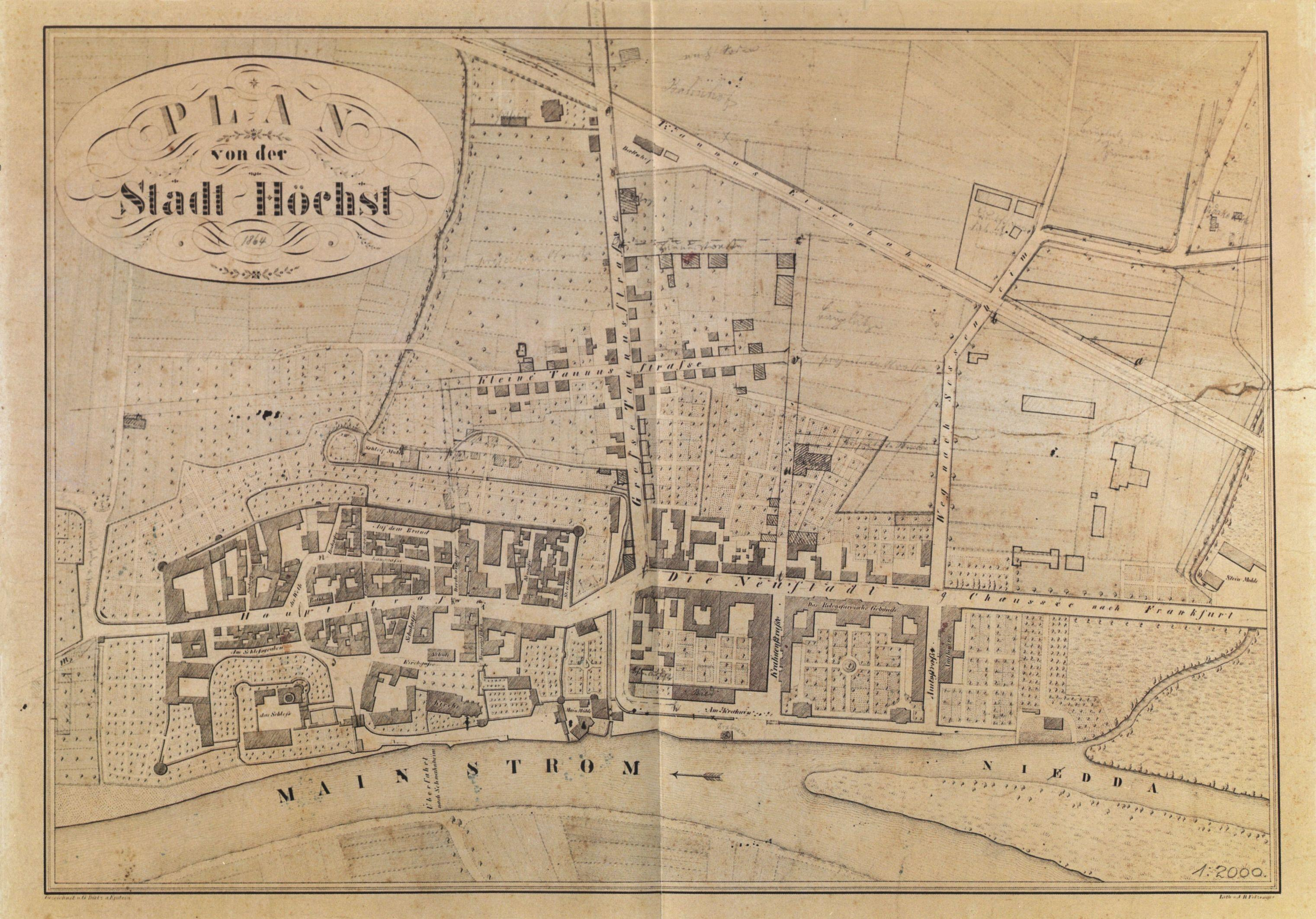
City map of Höchst from the year 1864

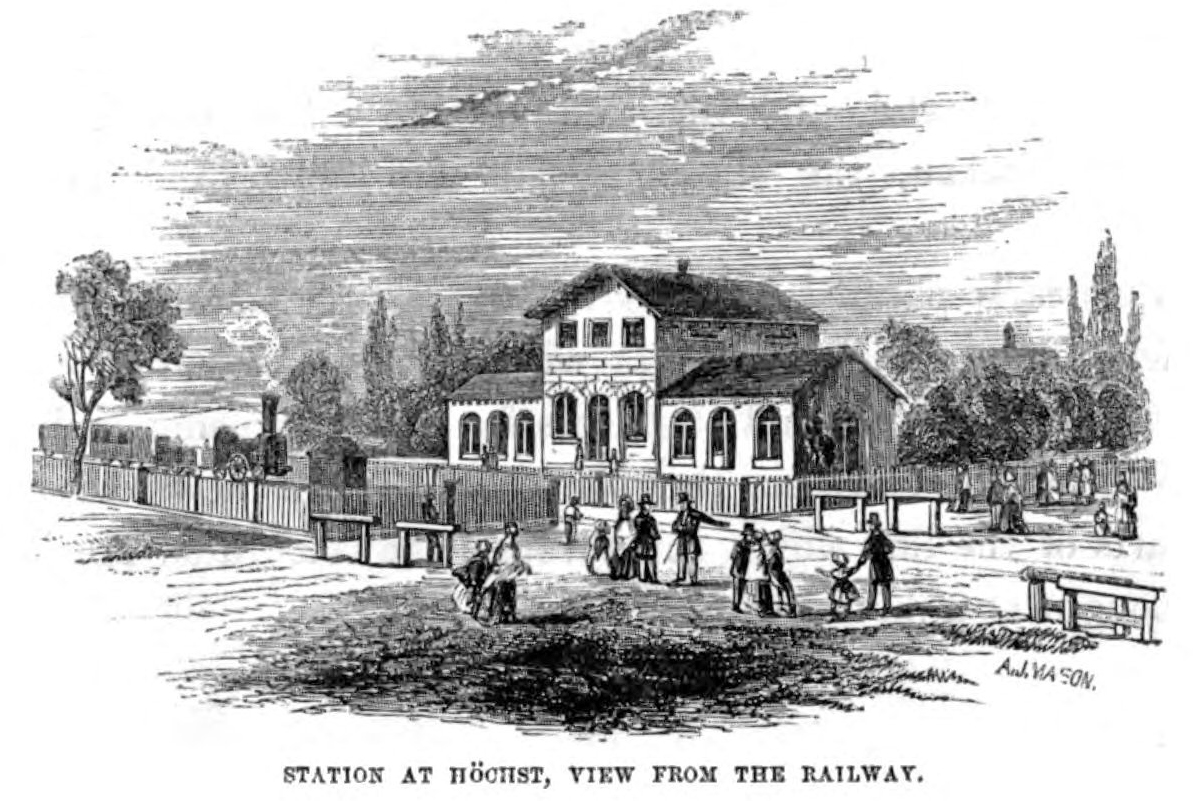
The former Höchster railroad station from 1839, English steel engraving from 1846.

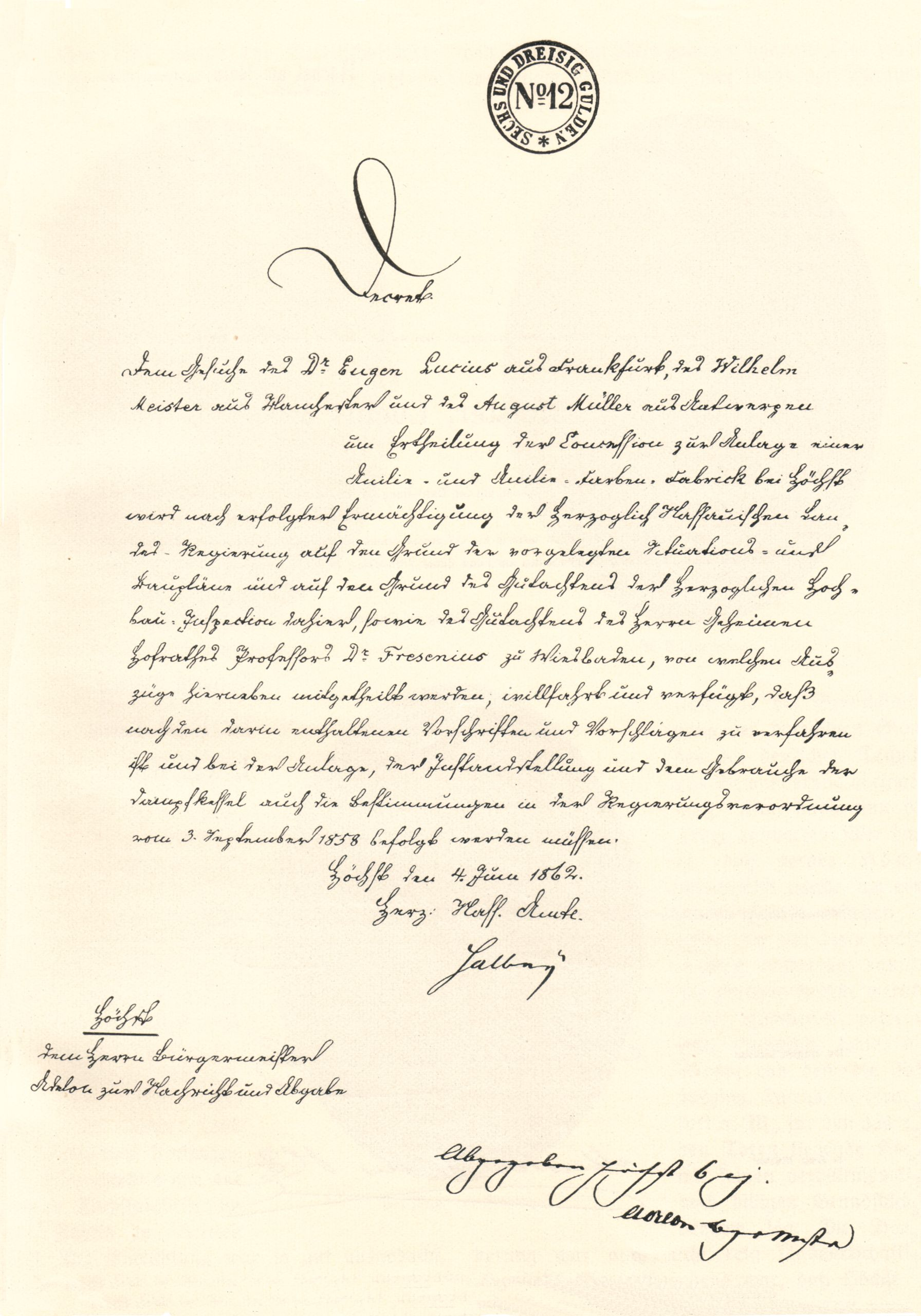
Building and operating permit for the chemical works Meister, Lucius & Co. by the ducal Nassau administration 1862

With the end of the Holy Roman Empire through the Imperial Deputation of 1803, the ecclesiastical principalities were dissolved – the territory of the Archbishopric of Mainz was also secularized. The town and office of Höchst were assigned to the Principality of Nassau-Usingen, which was absorbed into the Duchy of Nassau in 1806. The residence city responsible for Höchst was now Wiesbaden. A few years later, Höchst was separated from the Archbishopric of Mainz under canon law. As part of the reorganization of the dioceses in 1821, Höchst, together with the Duchy of Nassau and the Free City of Frankfurt, became part of the newly created diocese of Limburg in 1827.

From November 1 to 2, 1813, Napoléon Bonaparte, who had been defeated at Leipzig, spent his last night on the right bank of the Rhine. He spent the night in the Bolongaro Palace. His opponent, Marshal Blücher, reached Höchst a few days later, on November 17. He used the Bolongaro Palace as his headquarters until December 27 of that year.

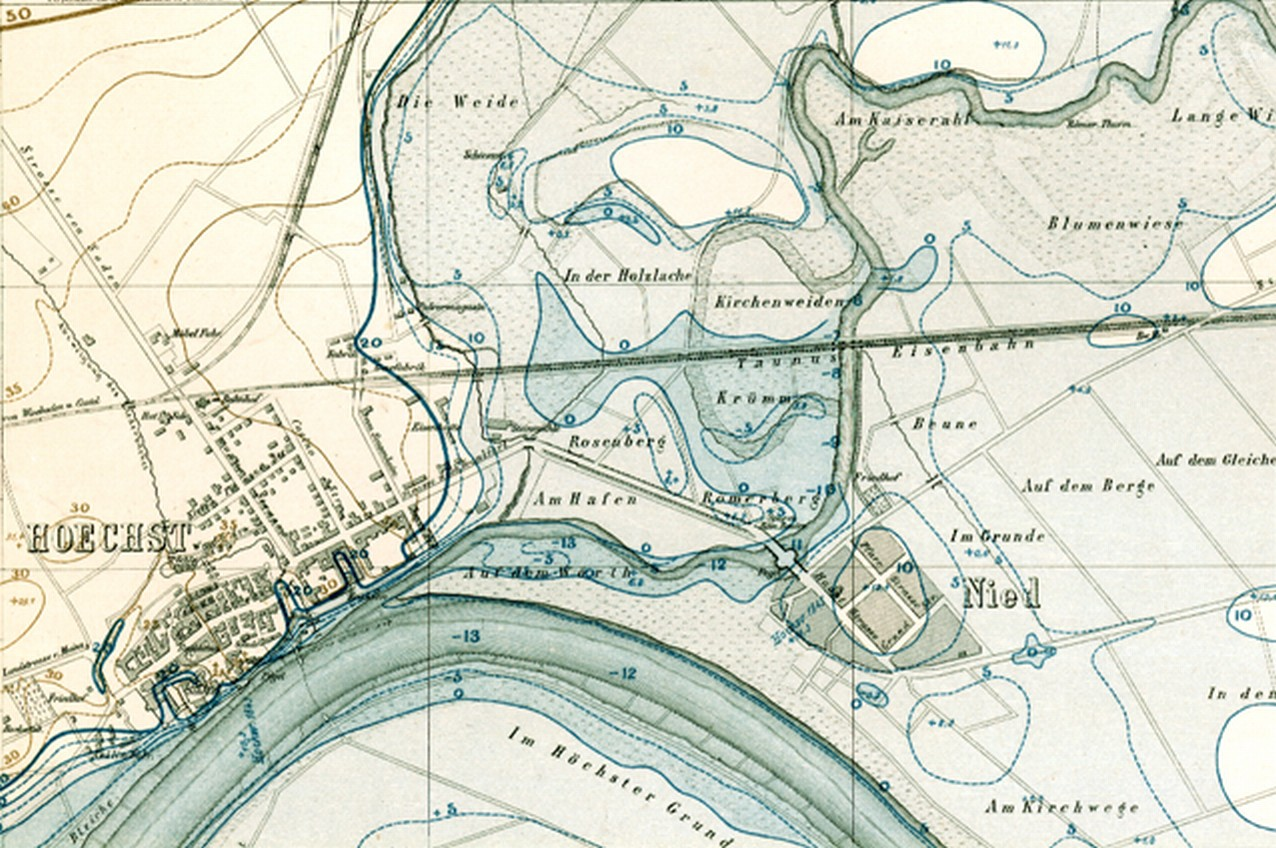
Höchst and Nied on a flood cadastre from 1870

After the end of the Wars of Liberation in 1813, the Nassau government began to improve the infrastructure and reform the administration of the duchy. Höchst became the administrative seat of the Höchst district in 1816. As part of the expansion of the Mainzer Landstraße, the obstructive and useless city walls and both city gates were demolished in 1816 and the main street was extended. Only the Main front of the old town fortifications remained, as there was no room for the town to expand. It still characterizes Höchst's image on the Main side today. Königsteiner Straße, which was created as part of the new town project, was extended between 1814 and 1820 as a road towards Königstein. Höchst experienced further economic and population growth. In 1822, the entry in a geography book read:

Höchst, at the confluence of the Nidda and the Main, with 1516 inhabitants, tobacco and other factories, strong trade. The Bolongaro building adorns this lively little town.

The first stage of the Taunusbahn from Frankfurt to Höchst was opened on September 26, 1839. It was one of the first German railroads. The first Höchst station was located at the level crossing on today's Königsteiner Straße. The line to the Nassau residence of Wiesbaden was completed by the beginning of 1840. In 1847, the branch line to the then very popular spa town of Soden opened.

After the March Revolution of 1848, which did not pass Höchst by, the Nassau government decided on an administrative reform. A law passed in December 1848 to reorganize the municipal administration introduced an honorary municipal council elected for four years. The municipal council was elected by the municipal assembly and consisted of a mayor, a council clerk and a number of municipal councillors that varied according to the size of the municipality. From 1860 to 1887, Höchst had four honorary mayors.

In the middle of the 19th century, the Industrial Revolution in Germany reached its first peak. The Duchy of Nassau did all it could to promote the establishment of industry, while the Free City of Frankfurt did not want to tolerate any large factories within its borders. As early as 1856, the first Simeons, Ruth and Co. chemical products factory was opened in Höchst. In 1863, the two Frankfurt entrepreneurs Eugen Lucius and his brother-in-law Carl Friedrich Wilhelm Meister founded the company Theerfarbenfabrik Meister, Lucius & Co. The initially very small company grew rapidly. Under the name Farbwerke Höchst vorm. Meister Lucius & Brüning AG and later as Hoechst AG, it became the largest chemical and pharmaceutical group in the world. In the vernacular of Höchst, the plant always kept the name Rotfabrik, after one of the young company's first products, the red dye Fuchsin.

=== Groß-Höchst – The Prussian district and industrial town ===
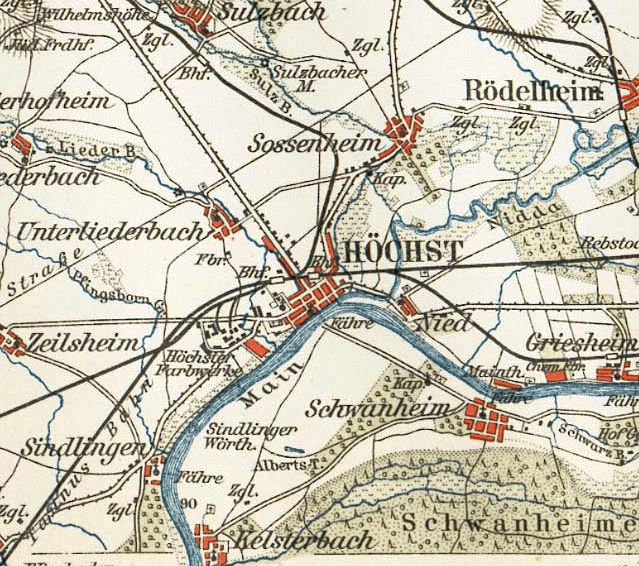
Höchst and the surrounding area in 1893.

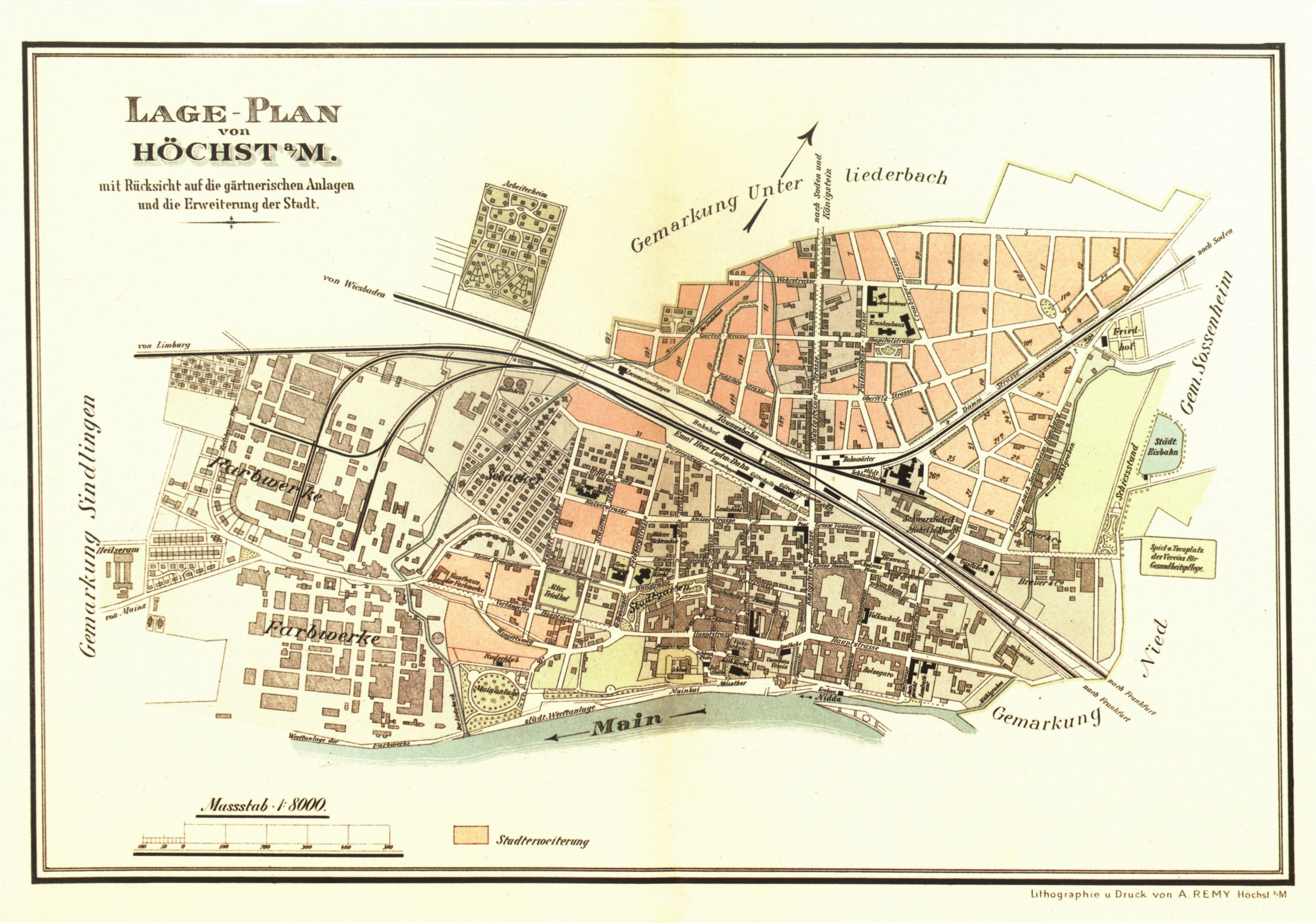
City map of Höchst am Main from the year 1898

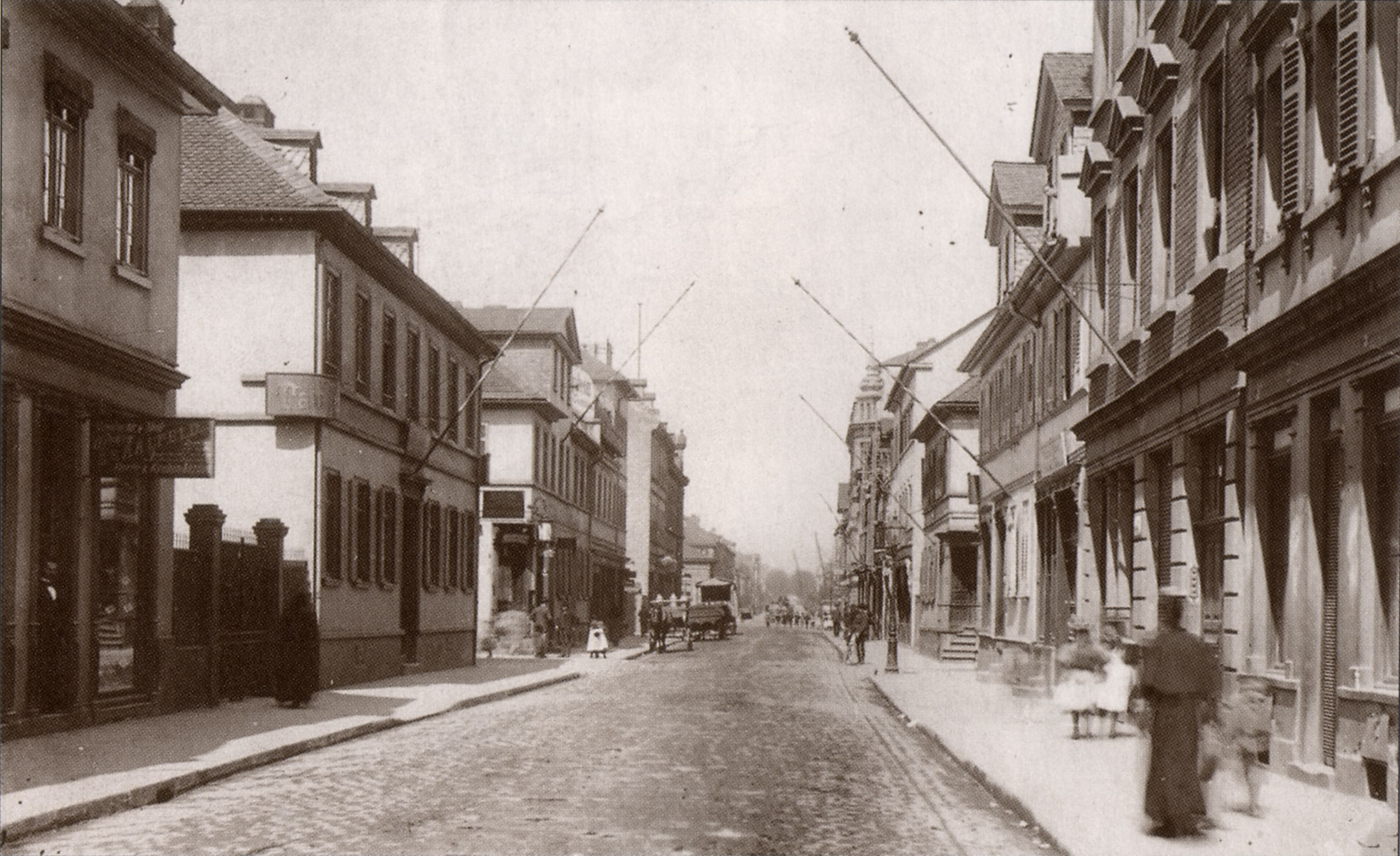
Königsteiner Strasse in the year 1900

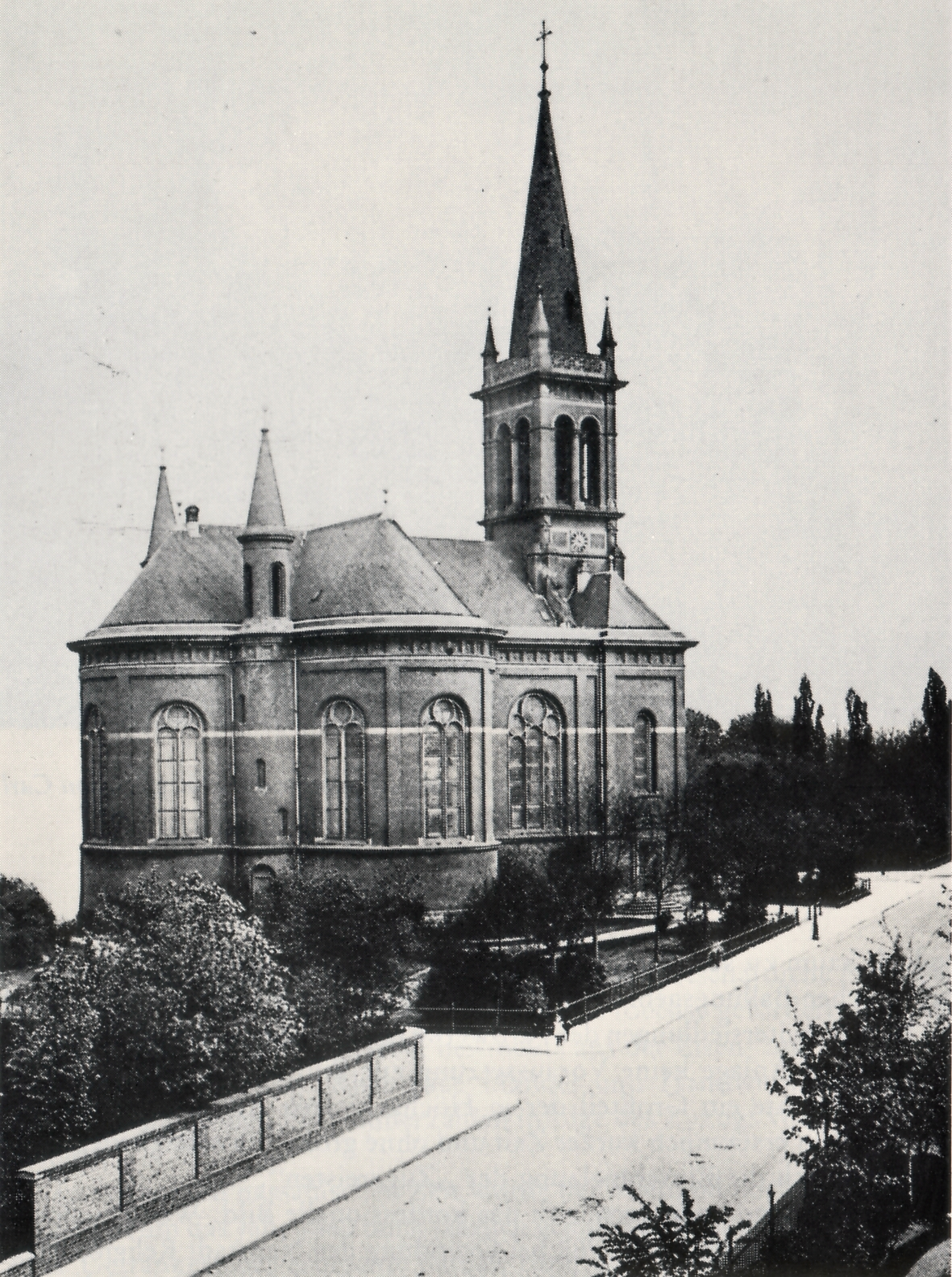
The Protestant town church in 1905

The Duchy of Nassau was on the side of the German Confederation in the German War and was therefore one of the losers of the war. The Duchy was annexed by Prussia together with the Free City of Frankfurt and the Electorate of Hesse. From 1867 to 1885, the town of Höchst belonged to the new district of Wiesbaden in the province of Hesse-Nassau. In 1886, Höchst became the county seat of the newly founded district of Höchst.

On December 31, 1866, the Prussian administration finally abolished the Mainz customs duty. The last two Höchst customs officials left their posts on February 15, 1867, the office's equipment was auctioned off and the buildings were rented out as private apartments. The customs tower was converted into a school in 1870.

The new Main-Lahn Railway to Limburg was put into operation in 1877. When the Limburg line was built in 1880, a new station building was erected on the current site. It was located as an island station between the tracks and was accessible via a cul-de-sac from Königsteiner Straße. In 1902, the Königsteiner Bahn to Königstein im Taunus was opened. In 1914, the last public building project in Höchst before the First World War was a new railroad station, the third after 1839 and 1880. With its twelve tracks and the representative Art Nouveau-style station building, it was a symbol of the rapid growth that the town experienced due to its rise as a chemical site.

The population jumped from 6517 in 1885 to 14,000 in 1905, and more industrial and craft businesses settled here. In 1908, Höchster Hafen was expanded on the banks of the Main for the growing transportation of goods on the river.The previously flat bank was heaped up by two meters. New districts were laid out, and the Westend with its Wilhelminian style and Art Nouveau buildings was created. While the city map of 1864 still shows a city layout that is almost indistinguishable from the late medieval expansion in the Old Town and the New Town has hardly grown beyond Emmerich-Joseph's plan, the city map of 1898 illustrates Höchst's rapid growth within thirty years.

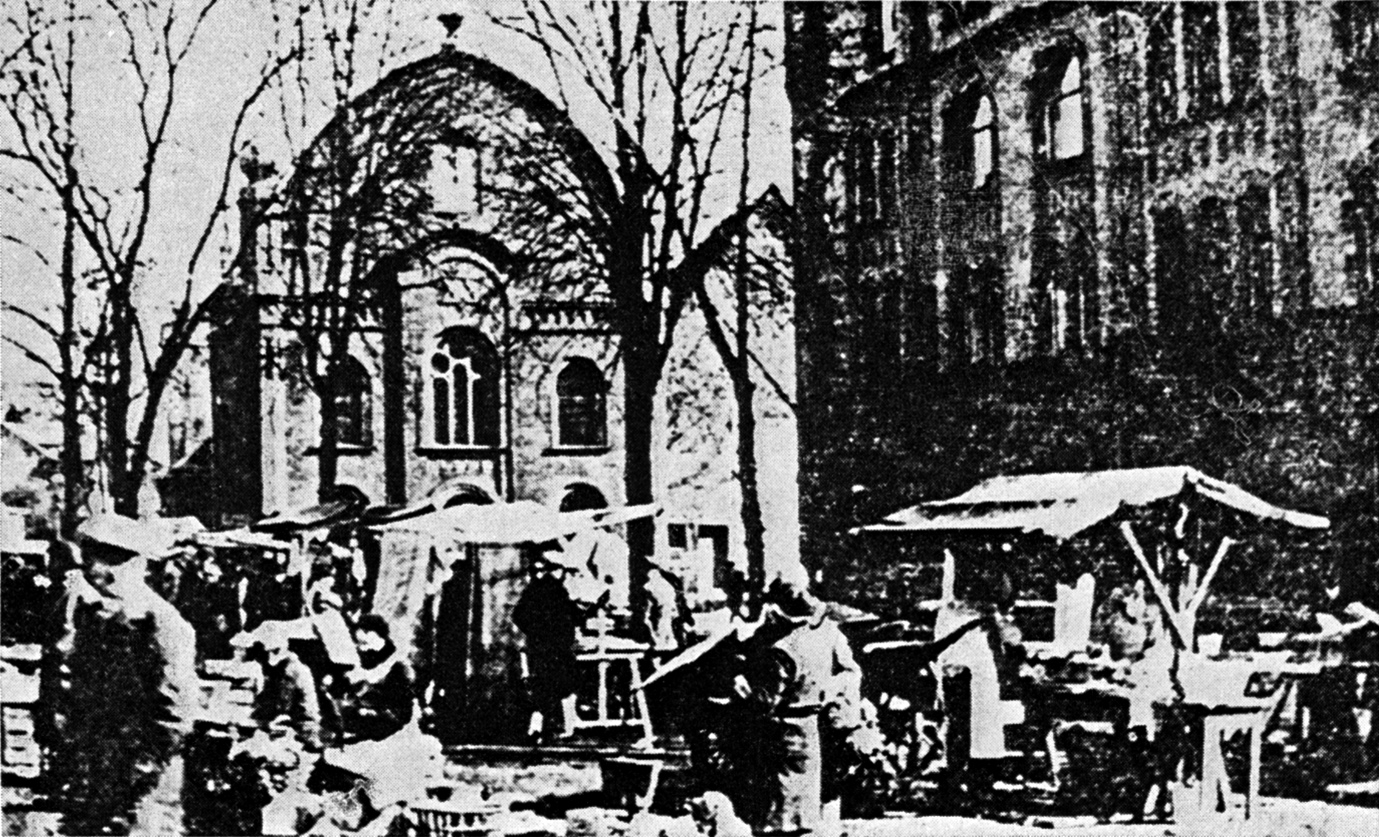
The synagogue inaugurated in 1905Picture from November 1923

Religious life in the town also became more diverse. While Höchst had previously been traditionally Catholic as a Mainz possession, Protestants and citizens of the Jewish faith were now moving in. With financial support from the industrialist Adolf von Brüning, the Protestant town church was built in 1882. In 1905, the Jewish community inaugurated its new synagogue on today's market square. In 1909, the new Catholic parish church of St. Joseph was consecrated, the construction of which was financed by the Prussian state as a result of the expropriation of church property during the secularization of 1803. This was decided in 1906 in a court case between the Catholic parish and the Prussian treasury known as the Höchster Kirchenbauprozess.

Ultimately, the voluntary administration was no longer able to cope with the problems of the growing industrial city. Without the massive influence of Farbwerke Hoechst and its founding families on the social and cultural development of the city and their construction of social housing for the working class, Höchst's infrastructure would have long since collapsed. In 1888, Höchst got its first full-time mayor in Eugen Gebeschus. The administrative lawyer quickly committed himself to planned urban development that organized the city's growth and structured the available space. In 1907, Höchst acquired the Bolongaro Palace, which had previously been used as a residential and industrial building, for the growing city administration and had it converted into a town hall.

In the middle of the First World War, on April 1, 1917, the municipalities of Unterliederbach, Sindlingen and Zeilsheim were incorporated into Höchst am Main. The new town was now called Groß-Höchst and suddenly had 32,000 inhabitants. Its mayor Ernst Janke, incumbent from 1911 to 1923, was appointed Lord Mayor by Wilhelm II.

=== After the First World War – French occupation and inflation ===
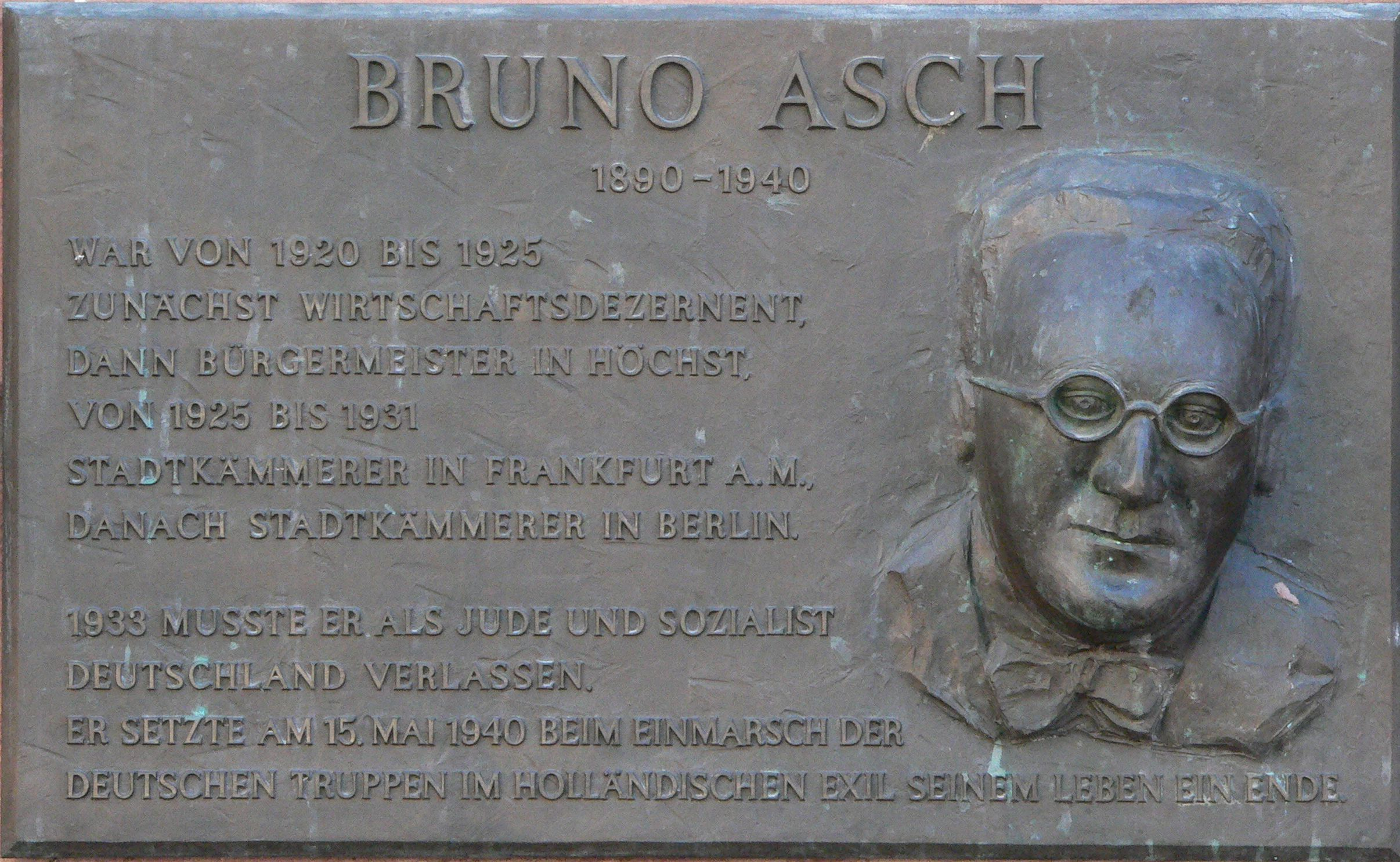
Memorial plaque for Bruno Asch at the Bolongaro Palace

After the end of the war, the areas of Germany on the left bank of the Rhine were occupied by France as a result of the Treaty of Versailles. There were also three bridgeheads on the right bank of the Rhine, each within a radius of thirty kilometers around Cologne, Koblenz and Mainz. Höchst was located within the Mainz occupation area and was occupied by French troops on December 14, 1918, which included not only Frenchmen from the mother country but also soldiers from the French colonies of Morocco and Algeria. They took up quarters in the Höchster barracks built especially for them. A border crossing (customs border) was set up at the Nidda bridge to Nied and street name signs in French were put up. Mayor Janke was expelled in 1919 for resisting the occupying power, and his successor Bruno Asch met the same fate in 1923. He conducted official business by telephone from Frankfurt until 1925, before becoming city treasurer there and handing over his office to Bruno Müller, the last mayor of Höchst. The French occupation did not end until 1930.

The Technical Administration Building by Peter Behrens, one of the most important expressionist industrial buildings, was built at the Höchst plant between 1920 and 1924. Between the station and Königsteiner Straße, one of the few Expressionist parks in Germany, today's Bruno-Asch-Anlage, was laid out south of the railroad embankment. The Höchst city architect Carl Rohleder had radical plans for a "Groß-Höchst", which envisaged the demolition and redevelopment of almost the entire old town. They could not be realized due to Höchst's financially weak situation. Inflation and the costs of the French occupation between 1918 and 1930 had emptied the city's coffers. In addition, trade tax income had fallen considerably after I.G. Farben, to which Hoechst AG also belonged, was transformed from an interest group into a corporation headquartered in Frankfurt in 1925. The majority of the tax revenue from Hoechst AG now flowed into the neighboring city. Little was invested in the Höchst plant during these years, as the new group had its main focus in central Germany.

The economic interests of the Group and its headquarters in Frankfurt prompted the Prussian government to exert pressure on the Höchst administration. If Höchst did not voluntarily allow itself to be incorporated into Frankfurt, the Prussian state parliament would force it to do so by means of a legislative act. In order to avoid having incorporation conditions dictated to it and to continue to benefit from the vital tax revenue, the Höchst magistrate decided to voluntarily relinquish its independence. On January 5, 1928, the city council passed the incorporation agreement negotiated with Frankfurt with its annex on Höchst's further development. The previous mayor of Höchst, Bruno Müller (SPD), became a department head in Frankfurt.

== A district of Frankfurt – Höchst since 1928 ==
=== From the late 1920s to the end of the Second World War ===
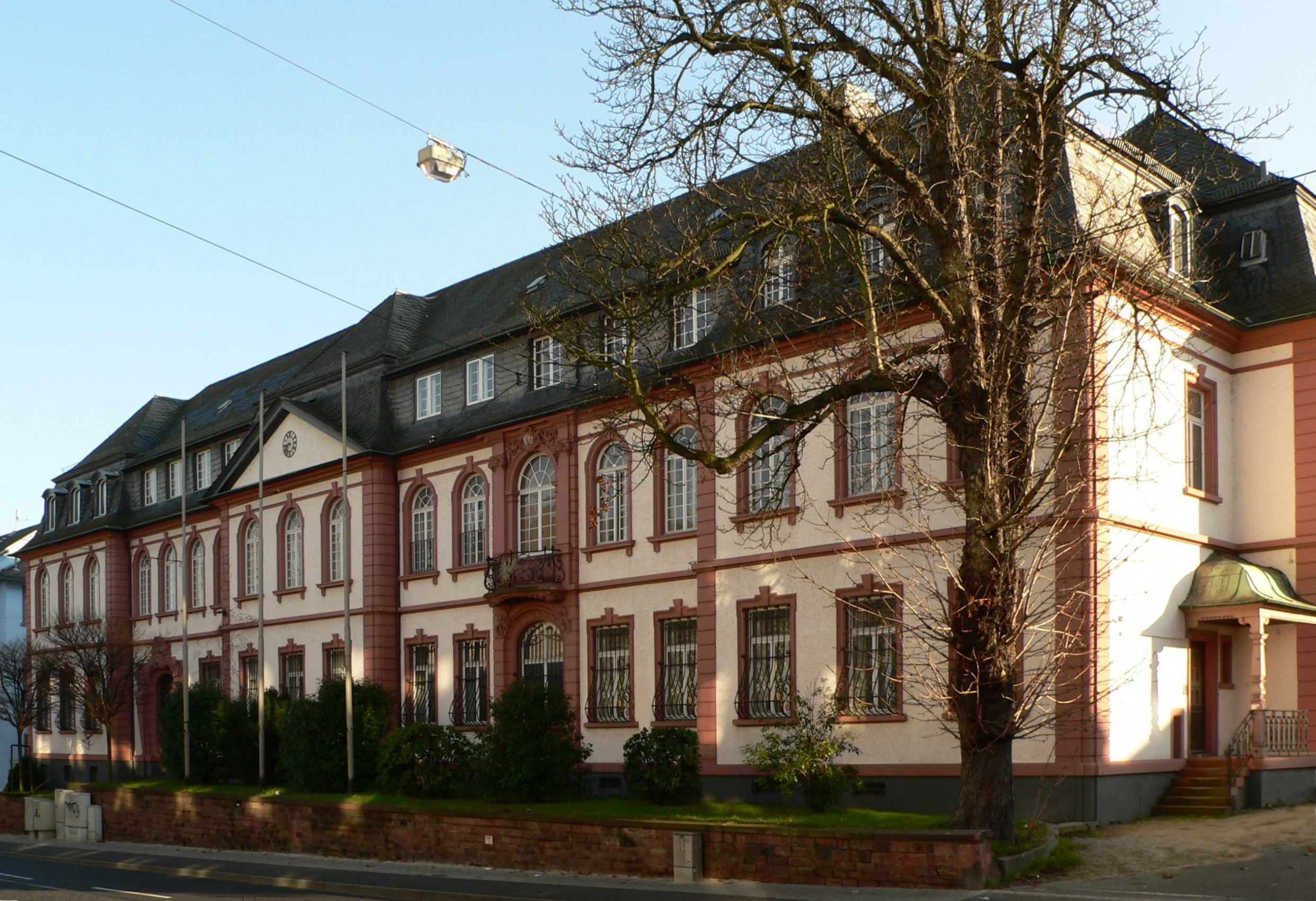
Former district hall on Höchster Bolongarostraße

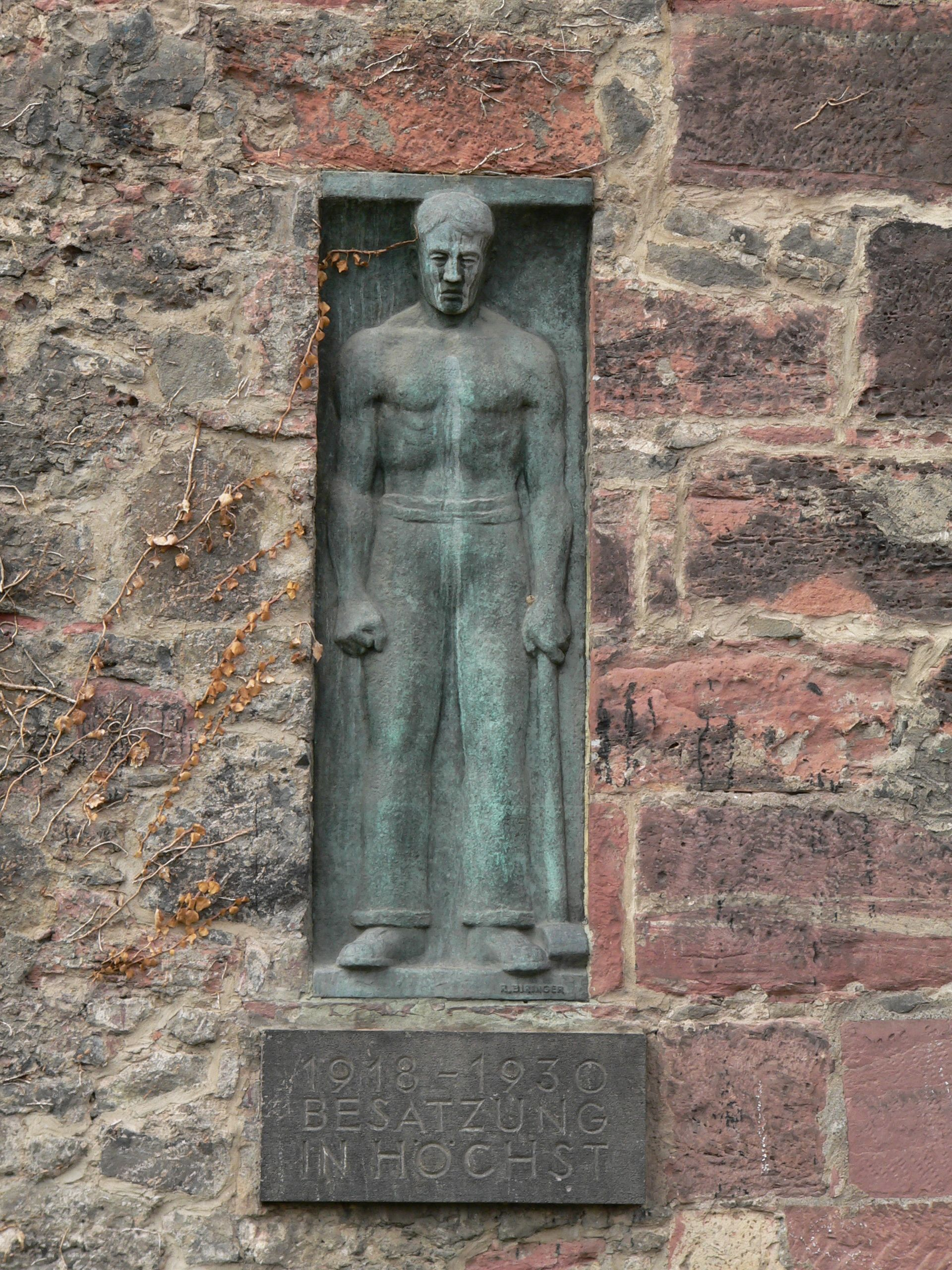
A memorial set into the town wall on the Main side by the Höchst artist Richard Biringer, commemorating the time of the French occupation.

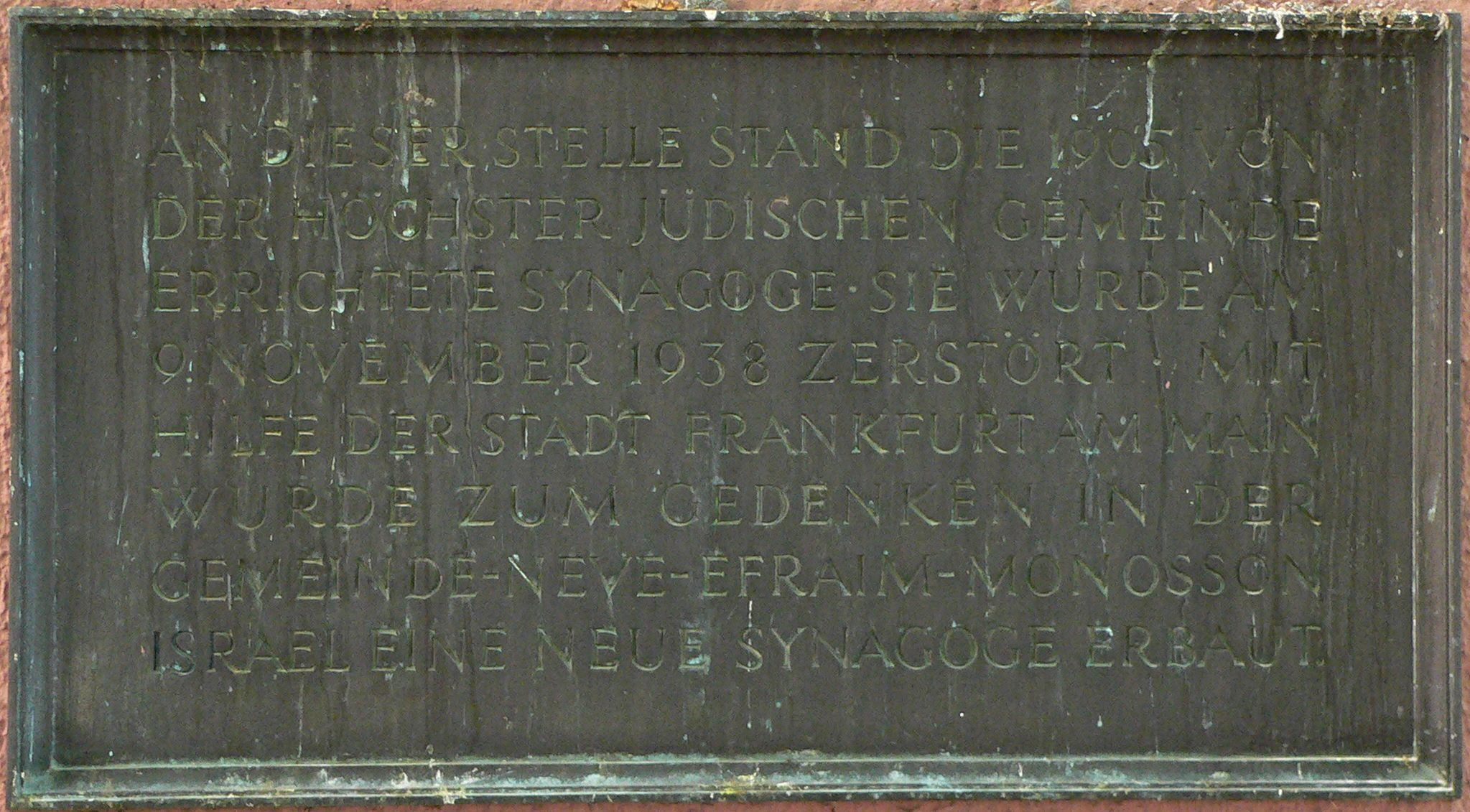
Memorial plaque to the synagogue at Höchster Markt.

On April 1, 1928, Höchst lost its municipal independence after 573 years and became a district of Frankfurt (Frankfurt-West). The old town and the Höchst districts incorporated in 1917 became Frankfurt districts. The French military administration initially opposed the incorporation, but then agreed to it. After the last French troops had left in December 1929, the French occupation of Höchst formally ended in June 1930.

However, Höchst remained the seat of the district administration of the Main-Taunus district, which was newly formed from the old district of Höchst and the old district of Wiesbaden as part of a territorial reform, until 1980.

When the National Socialists came to power, Höchst's local political situation changed. The incorporation treaty provided for a high degree of autonomy for the district, which also included its own budget. This did not fit in with the centralist leadership principle of the new rulers, and Höchst became a dependent administrative district of Frankfurt. Building projects and urban development measures promised in the annex to the treaty were not carried out and the treaty disappeared into the city archives.

The National Socialists quickly began expropriating Höchst's Jewish population. The owners of the large city department store Schiff, which opened on Königsteiner Straße in 1929, were forced to sell; the department store was sold to the Hertie Group via an intermediate owner. The shoe factory R. & W. Nathan OHG, located opposite the station, was also "aryanized" and half of its shares were acquired by Dresdner Bank. The company was renamed ADA-ADA-Schuh AG and the owners were forced to emigrate. During the November pogroms of 1938, the synagogue built in 1905 on the market square was burnt down by SA men; the fire department merely protected surrounding houses from the fire. An air raid shelter was built in place of the synagogue. A memorial plaque on its west façade today commemorates the event.

In contrast to the city center of Frankfurt and other parts of the city, Höchst was only slightly damaged in the air raids on Frankfurt am Main during the Second World War. Four houses were destroyed in air raids in 1940, killing 13 people. In particular, the Hoechst AG plants were only slightly damaged. Only one production plant, the telephone exchange and the plant library were destroyed. A total of 53 houses were hit in Höchst. According to eyewitness reports, there was not a single heavy air raid in Höchst.

The last bombardment of Höchst by US artillery took place on the evening of March 27, 1945. On March 29, 1945, American troops marched into Höchst and occupied the district and the chemical plant.

=== The development of Frankfurt-Höchst after 1945 ===
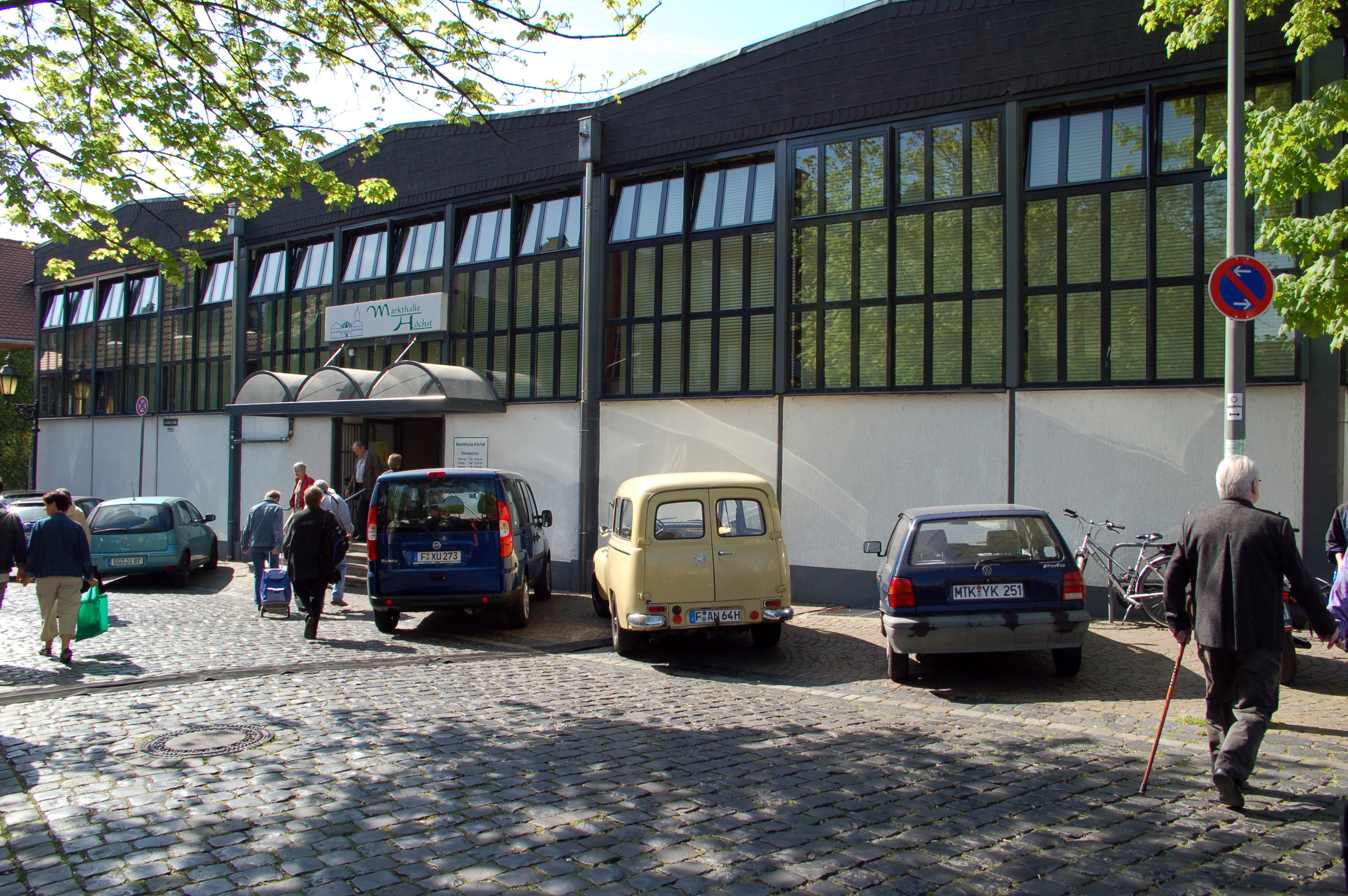
The market hall built in 1955

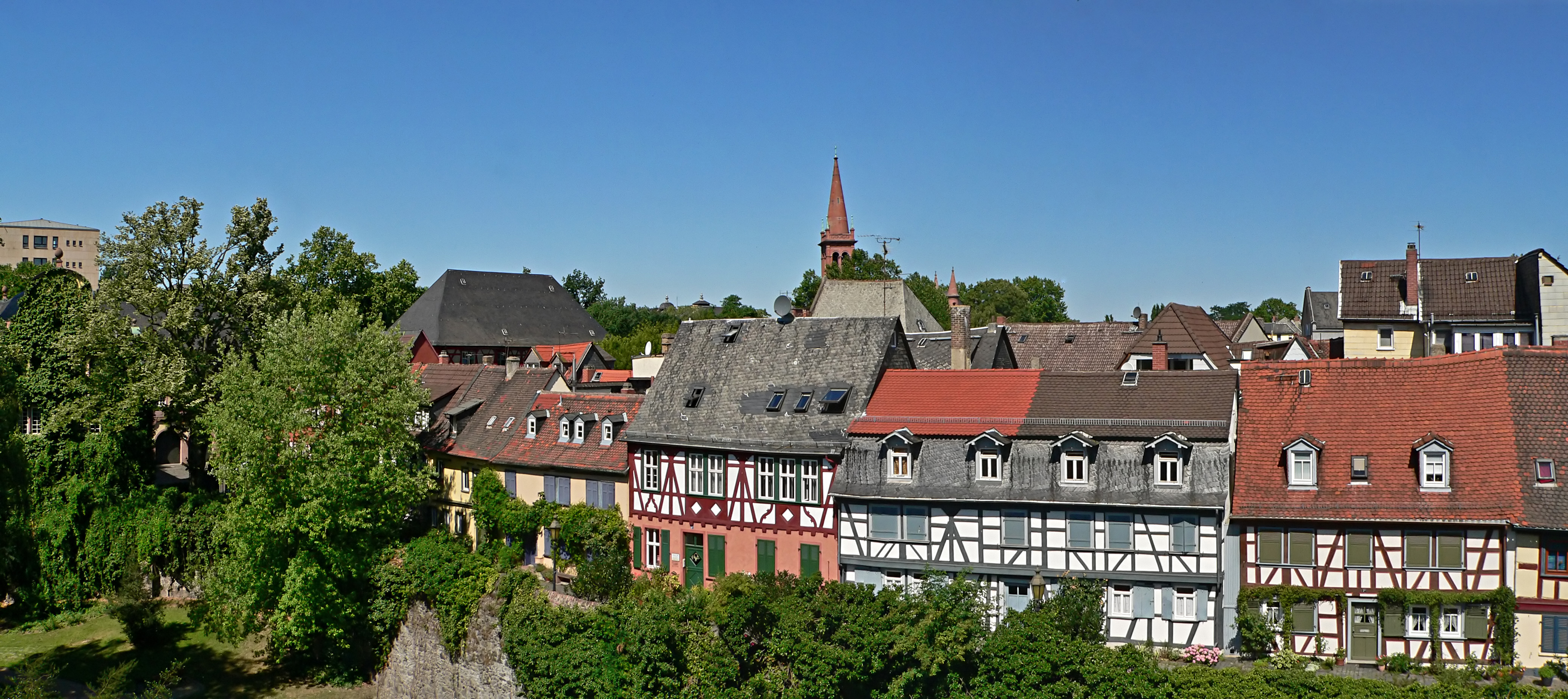
Renovated half-timbered houses in the old town

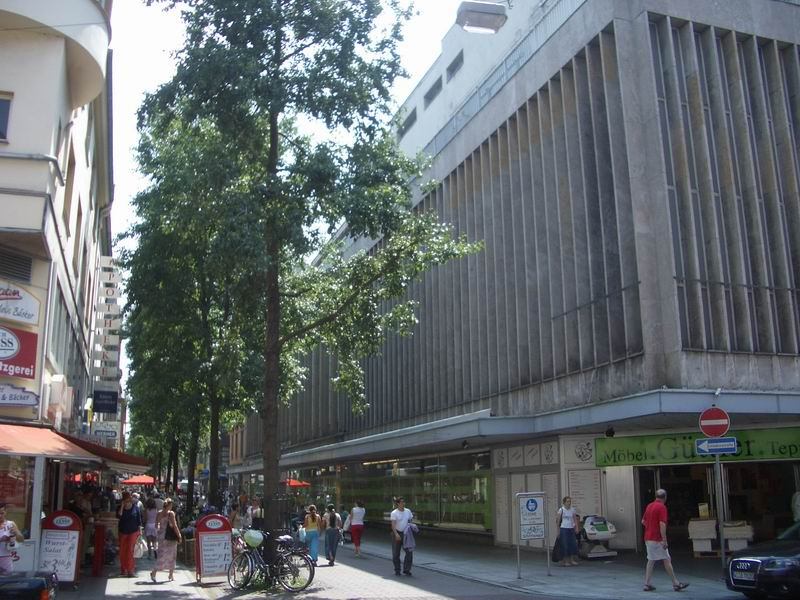
Former department store in the pedestrian zone in Königsteiner Straße

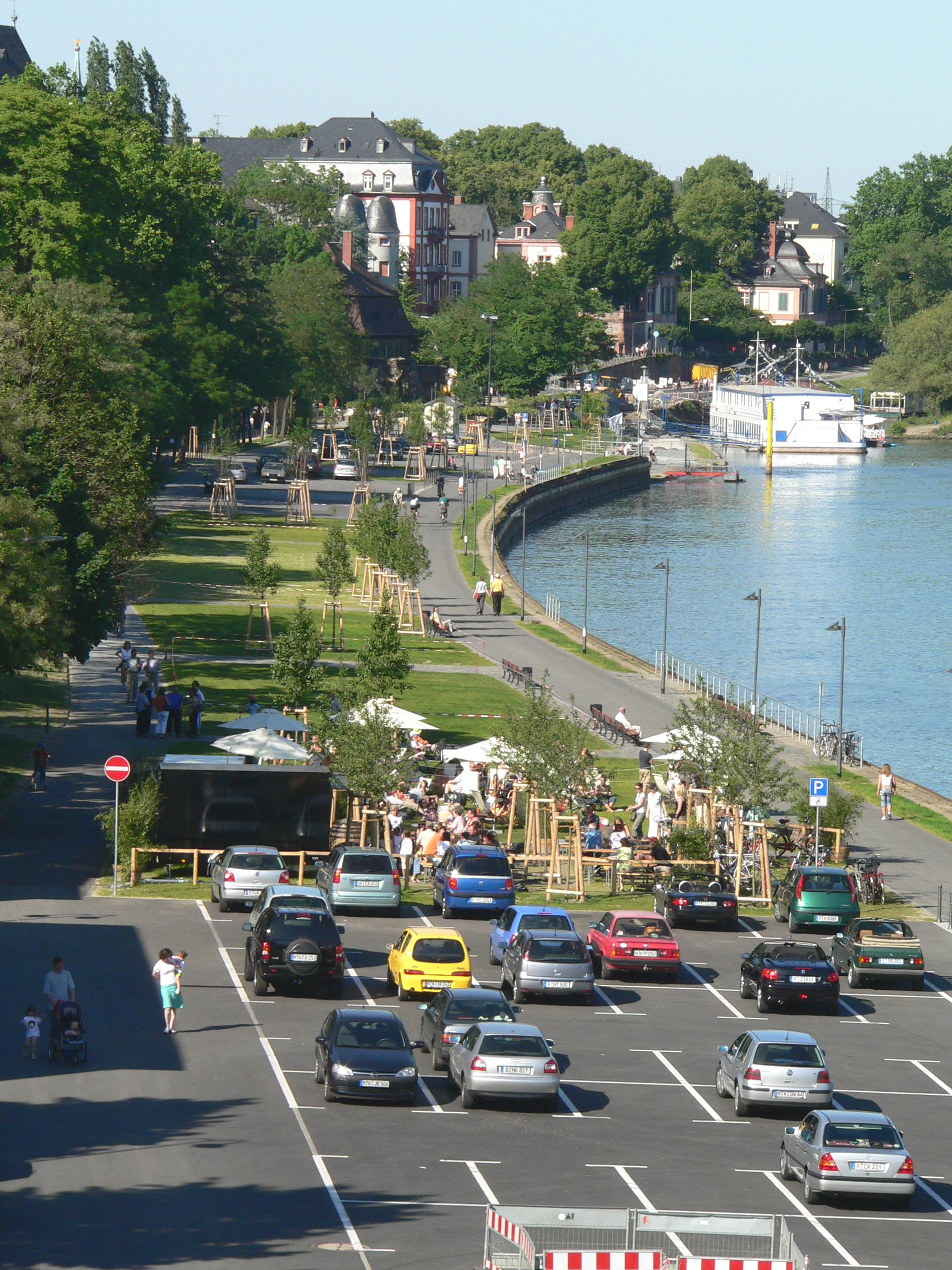
Redesigned Höchster Mainufer 2006

In July 1945, the AFN soldiers' radio station set up shop in Höchst Castle. The studios were located in the New Castle, the crew quarters in the Old Castle. The station remained in the castle until Hessischer Rundfunk moved into a new building in 1966.

In 1947, Höchster Porzellanmanufaktur was re-established at the instigation of Höchster journalist Rudolf Schäfer. After Hoechst AG made a financial contribution, the company was able to continue in 1965. Between 1977 and 2002, it was based in the Dalberger Haus in the old town; since then, the company has been based in Höchster Palleskestraße.

At the beginning of the 1950s, the incorporation treaty and its unfulfilled points came up for discussion again. The people of Höchst were still waiting for a connection to the Frankfurt tramway, and the contractually promised market hall, indoor swimming pool and Main Bridge had not yet been built. In 1953, Höchster citizens founded a committee with the slogan "Break Frankfurt's chains", which wanted to see the town removed from Frankfurt. As the Lord Mayor of Frankfurt, Walter Kolb, lived in a side wing of the Bolongaro Palace, he was able to get a direct impression of the discontent of the people of Höchst. On his initiative, the market hall and the indoor swimming pool were built and inaugurated in November 1955. The tramway was extended from Nied to Zuckschwerdtstraße in the east of Höchst. Other parts of the contract have only been fulfilled since the mid-1990s, such as the construction of a bridge over the Main in 1994 and the construction of the railroad station for Zeilsheim and Sindlingen in 2007.

The Höchster Schloßfest was held for the first time in 1957. In the years that followed, it developed into a cultural highlight of the region.

A first approach to monument protection in Höchst was made in 1959 with a building statute issued by the City of Frankfurt, which placed some houses in Höchst's old town under protection. This led to a local statute in 1972, which placed Höchst's old town as a whole under monument protection. In the following years, the streets of the old town were repaved and new streetlights were installed. Many historic buildings have since been renovated.

On July 4, 1979, the Hessian state parliament decided to move the administration of the Main-Taunus district from Höchst to Hofheim am Taunus, meaning that Höchst lost its status as a district town after almost two centuries. However, it remained the seat of the district administration until 1987. Until 1980, Höchst also had its own vehicle registration office for the license plate FH (Frankfurt-Höchst).

Since the 1970s, there has been a continuous population decline in Höchst. The district had and still has the reputation of being an industrial district with a low quality of living. In 2005, 39 percent of the population were migrants, which has led to social tensions and the formation of ghettos. The construction of shopping centers such as the Main-Taunus-Zentrum on Höchst's doorstep has lured traditional customers away from the Vordertaunus. After the district administration moved away, government employees and visitors also disappeared as customers from Höchst's stores. As a result, the retail sector in Höchst entered a crisis at the end of the 1980s.

Another economic turning point for the district came in the mid-1990s with the division and dissolution of Farbwerke Hoechst. The number of people employed at Industriepark Höchst fell from over 30,000 (around 1980) to less than 20,000 at times, and the shopping spree that used to be the norm for Rotfabriker employees during their lunch break became a victim of efforts to constantly increase efficiency. In 2007, the industrial park is a thriving location for more than 90 companies, which once again employ around 22,000 people, but generate little turnover for Höchst's retail and restaurant trade. The financial support of the former Hoechst AG for social, cultural and monument protection projects in the district also largely failed to materialize.

The conversion of a section of Königsteiner Strasse between Bolongarostrasse and Hostatostrasse into a pedestrian zone in 1990 was unable to halt the downward trend in Höchst's retail trade. Many specialist stores moved away or gave up, vacant business premises and stores selling low-price goods have characterized the image of Höchst's shopping streets ever since. For this reason, the City of Frankfurt decided in 2006 to support Höchst's urban development with twenty million euros over the next ten years in order to make Höchst an attractive residential and business location again.

== Literature ==
- Martin Zeiller: Höchst. In: Matthäus Merian (ed.): Topographia Hassiae et Regionum Vicinarum (= Topographia Germaniae. vol. 7). 2nd edition. Matthaeus Merian's heirs, Frankfurt am Main 1655, p. XIII (full text [Wikisource]).
- Wilhelm Frischholz: Alt-Höchst. Ein Heimatbuch in Wort und Bild. Hauser, Frankfurt am Main 1926.
- Leo Gelhard (Hrsg.): 600 Jahrfeier der Stadt Höchst am Main vom 2. bis 11. Juli 1955. Fest- und Programmbuch. Stadt Frankfurt am Main, Frankfurt am Main 1955.
- Markus Grossbach: Frankfurt-Höchst. Bildband. Sutton, Erfurt 2001, ISBN 3-89702-333-4.
- Wilhelm Grossbach: Alt-Höchst auf den zweiten Blick. Impressionen aus einer alten Stadt. Höchster Verlagsgesellschaft, Frankfurt 1980.
- Wilhelm Grossbach: Höchst am Main: gestern, heute, morgen. Frankfurter Sparkasse, Frankfurt am Main 2006, DNB 981276903.
- Wolfgang Metternich: Die Justinuskirche in Frankfurt am Main-Höchst. Verein für Geschichte und Altertumskunde, Frankfurt am Main 1986, DNB 810644657
- Wolfgang Metternich: Die städtebauliche Entwicklung von Höchst am Main. Stadt Frankfurt und Verein für Geschichte und Altertumskunde, Frankfurt am Main 1990, DNB 910477647.
- Wolfgang Metternich: Höchst erstaunliche Geschichte. Kramer, Frankfurt am Main 1994, ISBN 3-7829-0447-8.
- Wolfgang Metternich: Die Burg des 13. Jahrhunderts in Höchst am Main. Verein für Geschichte und Altertumskunde, Frankfurt am Main 1995.
- Rudolf Schäfer: Höchst am Main. Frankfurter Sparkasse, Frankfurt am Main 1981.
- Rudolf Schäfer: Chronik von Höchst am Main. Kramer, Frankfurt am Main 1987, ISBN 3-7829-0293-9.
- Heinrich Schüßler: Höchst. Stadt der Farben. Frankfurter Sparkasse von 1822, Frankfurt am Main 1953.
- Anna Elisabeth Schreier, Manuela Wex: Chronik der Hoechst Aktiengesellschaft. 1863–1988. Hoechst Aktiengesellschaft, Frankfurt am Main 1990, DNB 901055344.
- Magistrat der Stadt Höchst am Main (Hrsg.): Höchst am Main. Verlag der Stadtverwaltung, Höchst a. M. 1925.
