= Linden, Westerwaldkreis =

Linden
- Municipality
- Coat of arms

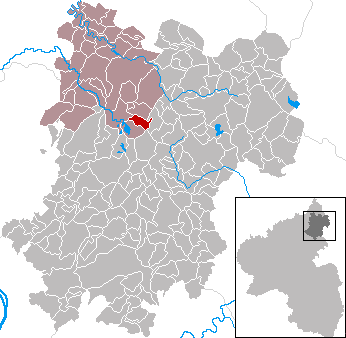
- Location of Linden within Westerwaldkreis district
- Interactive map of Linden
- Location within Germany Location within Rhineland-Palatinate
- Coordinates: 50°36′12″N 7°51′5″E
- Country: Germany
- State: Rhineland-Palatinate
- District: Westerwaldkreis
- Municipal assoc.: Hachenburg

Government
  - Mayor (2019–24): Roland Müller

Area
  - Total: 2.52 km^{2} (0.97 sq mi)
- Elevation: 464 m (1,522 ft)

Population (2025-12-31)
  - Total: 145
  - Density: 57.5/km^{2} (149/sq mi)
- Time zone: UTC+01:00 (CET)
  - Summer (DST): UTC+02:00 (CEST)
- Postal codes: 57629
- Dialling codes: 02666
- Vehicle registration: WW
- Website: www.linden-ww.de

Linden (German pronunciation: [ˈlɪndn̩]) is an Ortsgemeinde – a community belonging to a Verbandsgemeinde – in the Westerwaldkreis in Rhineland-Palatinate, Germany.

== Geography ==
The village of Linden lies north-northeast of Koblenz between Hachenburg in the north-northwest and Westerburg in the southeast, not far northeast of the Westerwald Lake Plateau. The community's highest point is the Wildenhahn (496 m above sea level), which lies roughly 650 m northwest of Linden. Directly north of the village is found the source of the river Wied (an eastern tributary to the Rhine), which passes Linden just to the east, flowing south towards the Dreifelder Weiher (lake).

Linden belongs to the Verbandsgemeinde of Hachenburg, a kind of collective municipality. Its seat is in the like-named town.

== History ==
Like many communities in the Westerwald, Linden first arose as a clearing for field cultivation. Although it had its first documentary mention in 1586, it is believed that Linden already existed by about 1315.

== Politics ==
The municipal council is made up of 7 council members, including the extraofficial mayor (Bürgermeister), who were elected in a majority vote in a municipal election on 13 June 2004.

== Economy and infrastructure ==
Of the once 21-strong agricultural businesses, none is now left. The community's livelihood is nowadays drawn from tourism, service industries and small industry.

=== Transport ===
The local bus lines 430, 431 and 433 run through Linden, the village is located on the area of the transport association Verkehrsverbund Rhein-Mosel (VRM). Linden is connected to the national highway network by Bundesstraße 8, which links the community to the middle centres of Hachenburg (10 km) and Altenkirchen (6 km). The Autobahn interchanges Mogendorf and Dierdorf on the A 3 (Cologne–Frankfurt) can be reached by way of Bundesstraßen 8 and 413, while the Hennef interchange on the A 5 (AS 60) can be reached by way of Bundesstraße 8.
