= Frankfurt-Zeilsheim station =

Railway station in Frankfurt, Germany

Frankfurt Zeilsheim
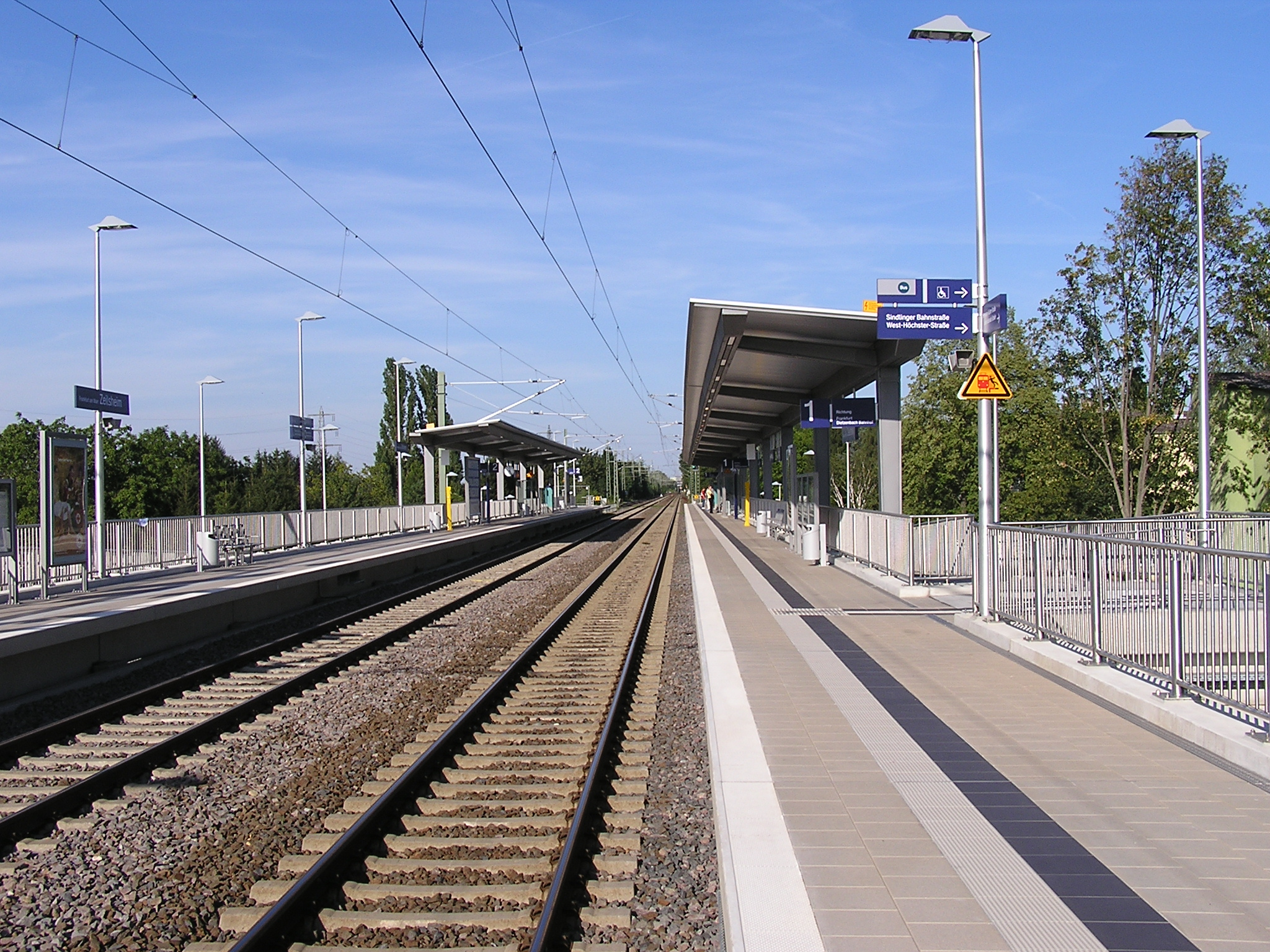
- General view, looking towards Frankfurt

General information
- Location: Frankfurt, Hesse; Germany
- Coordinates: 50°5′25″N 8°30′24″E
- Lines: Main-Lahn Railway (KBS 627/645.2)
- Platforms: 2

Construction
- Accessible: Yes

Other information
- Station code: 8058
- DS100 code: FZH
- Category: 5
- Fare zone: : 5013
- Website: www.bahnhof.de

History
- Opened: 13 May 2007

Services
Preceding station	Rhine-Main S-Bahn	Following station
Kriftel towards Niedernhausen	S2 (Rhine-Main S-Bahn)	Höchst Farbwerke towards Dietzenbach
Location
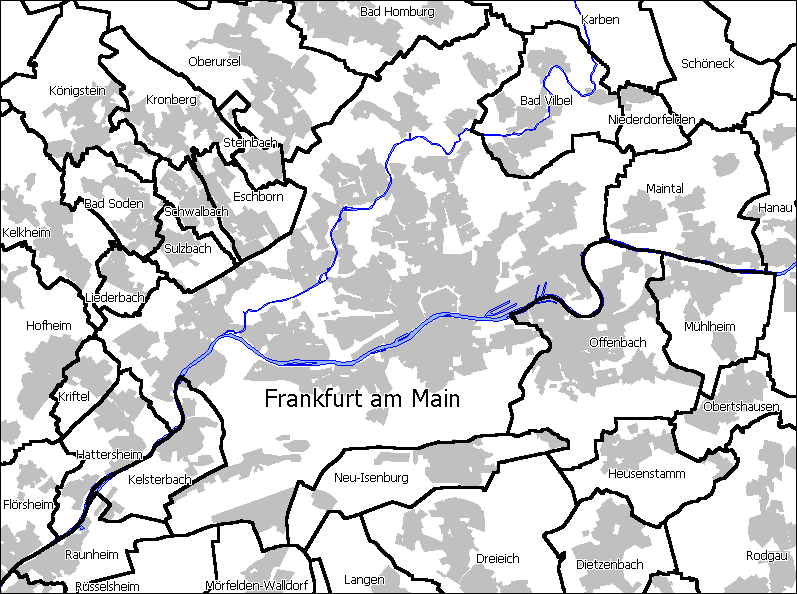
- Location within Frankfurt am Main Location within Hesse Location within Germany Location within Europe

Frankfurt-Zeilsheim station (German: Bahnhof Frankfurt-Zeilsheim) is a railway station located in the Sindlingen district of Frankfurt, Germany, on the Main-Lahn Railway. It is served by line S2 of the Rhine-Main S-Bahn. The station opened on 13 May 2007 and is classified by Deutsche Bahn as a category 5 station.

== Name and location ==
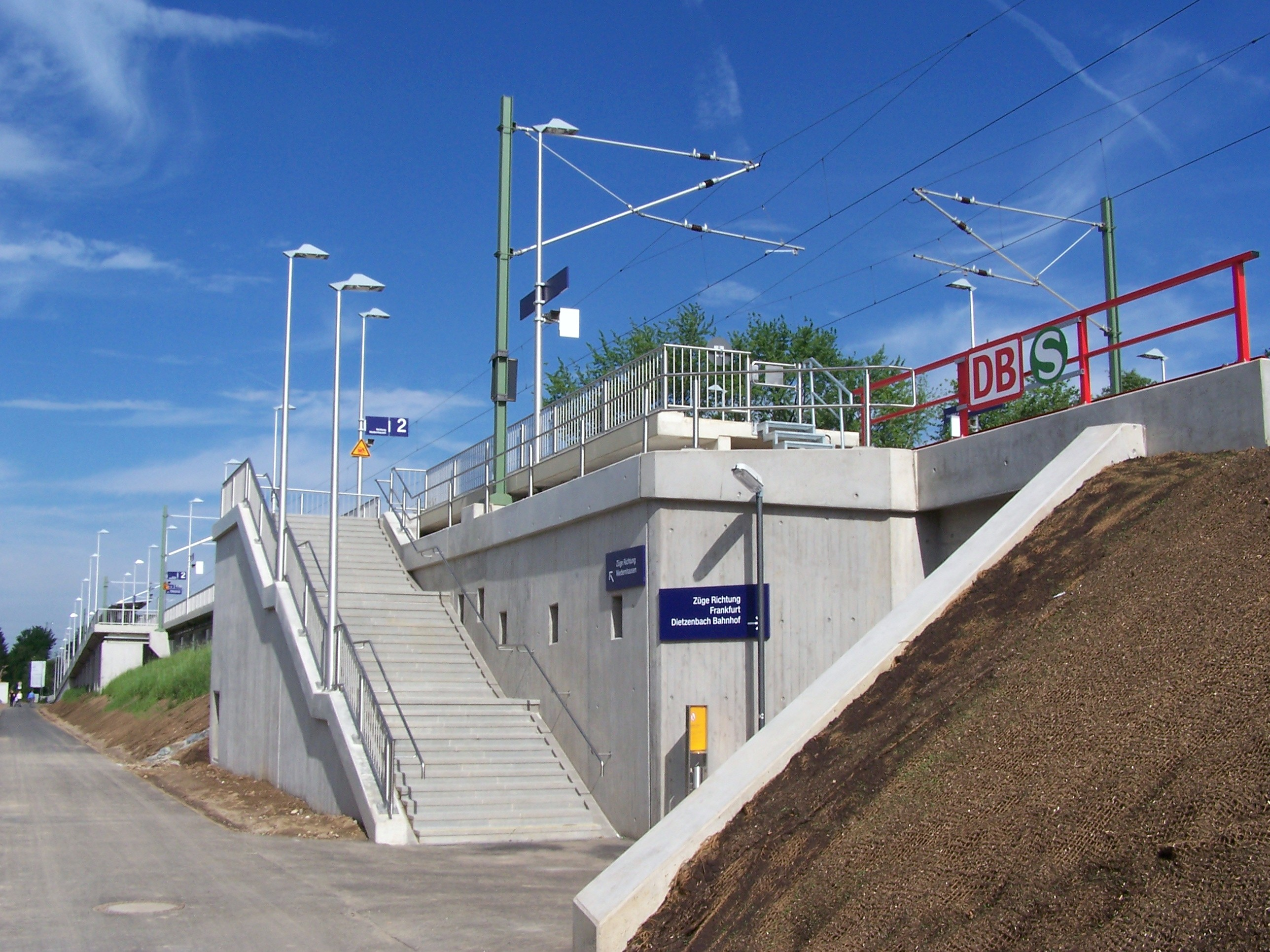
Western access to track 2

The station is located on an embankment of the Main-Lahn Railway (Main-Lahn-Bahn), which marks the border between the districts of Sindlingen and Zeilsheim. Thus, the platform serving trains towards the inner city and Dietzenbach is in Sindlingen, while the platform serving trains towards Niedernhausen is in Zeilsheim.

Two streets, Sindlinger Bahnstraße to the north and West-Höchster-Straße to the south, pass through an underpass to the east of the station. There are entrances from here to each platform, in both cases via a staircase and a ramp. A pedestrian underpass was built to provide a western entrance connecting to the Ferdinand-Hofmann estate and the Internationale Schule Frankfurt Rhein-Main in Sindlingen.

Although the station is in the Frankfurt district of Sindlingen and not in the Zeilsheim district, it was named after Zeilsheim because Frankfurt Sindlingen station already existed. The name Frankfurt Sindlingen North station was rejected by Deutsche Bahn.

The station cost €6.75 million to build, funded by the city of Frankfurt, Hesse and the Rhein-Main-Verkehrsverbund (Rhine-Main Transport Association, RMV).

== History ==
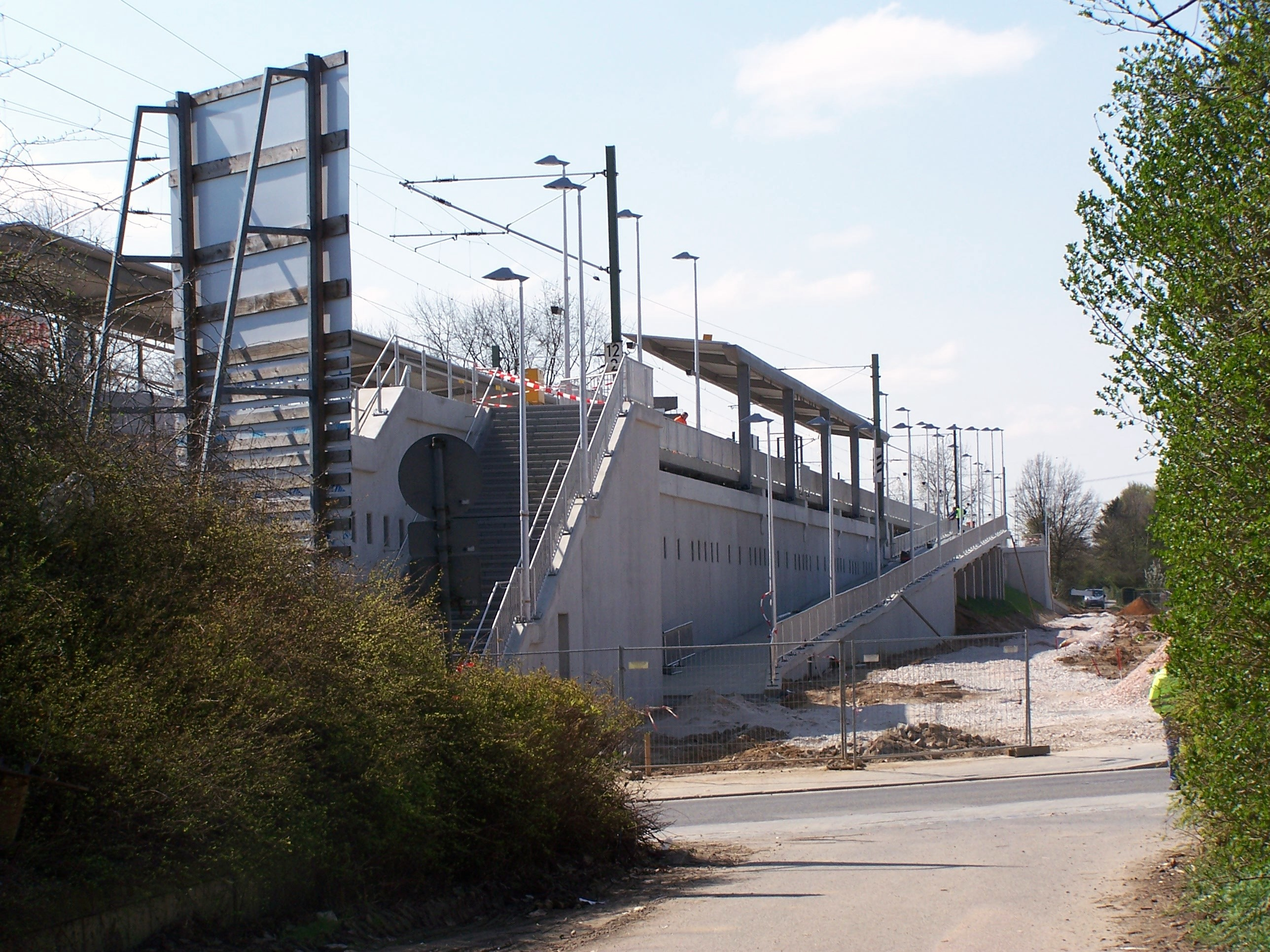
Work in April 2007

The communities of Zeilsheim and Sindlingen were incorporated into Höchst am Main, which in turn became part of Frankfurt in 1928. A commitment to construct a station between Zeilsheim and Sindlingen was part of the annexation agreement between Frankfurt and Höchst am Main.

The Frankfurt City Council authorised the preliminary planning for the construction of the station on 29 April 1999 after several years of preparatory work. Construction of the project started in January 2006. Originally, it was planned to open Zeilsheim station at the timetable change of 10 December 2006, but significant delays and mishaps during the construction led the opening to be postponed to the spring of 2007. It was eventually opened on 13 May 2007. Thus the terms of the annexation agreement of 1928 were fulfilled after 79 years.

== Operations ==
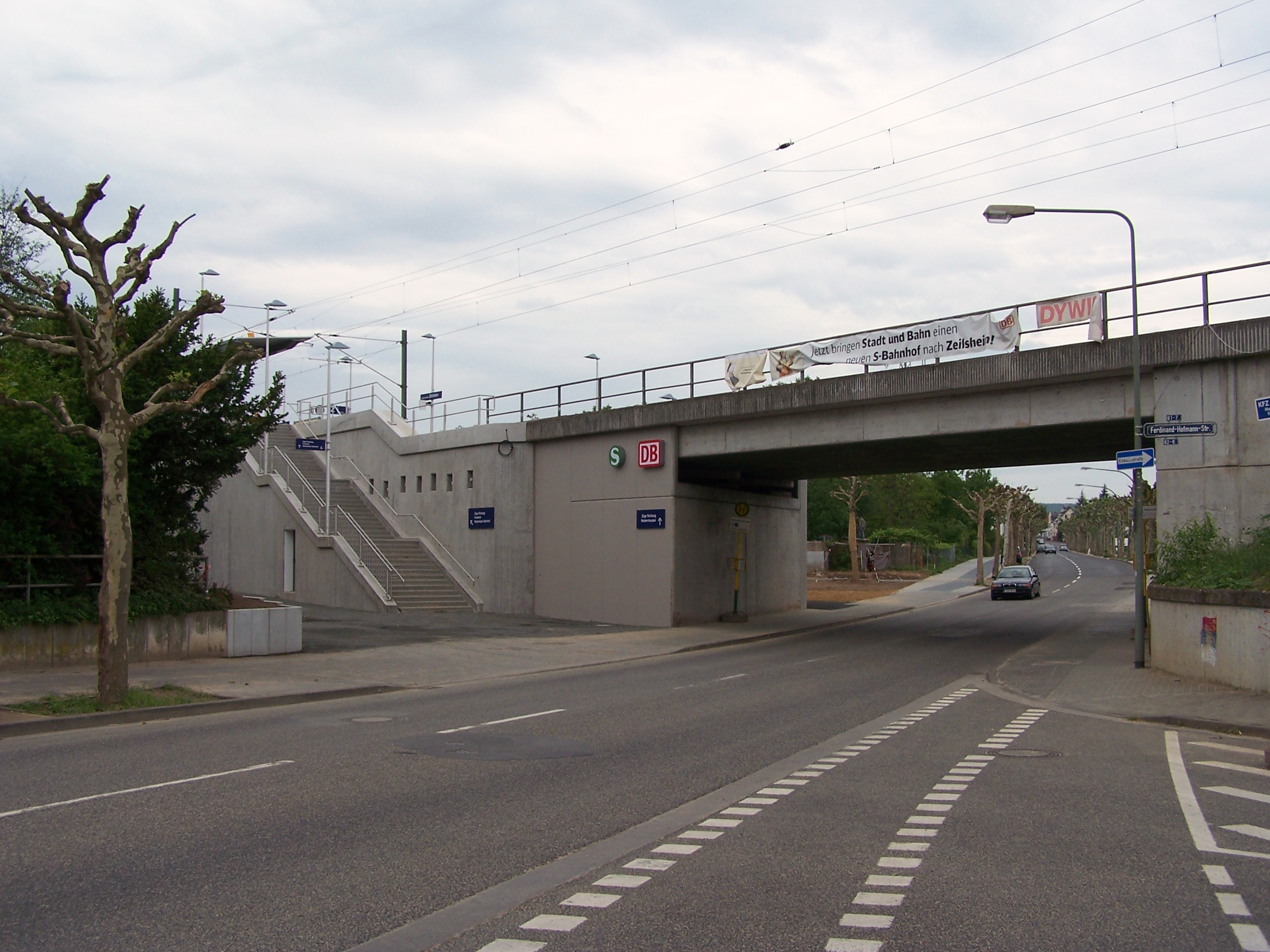
Sindlinger Bahnstraße

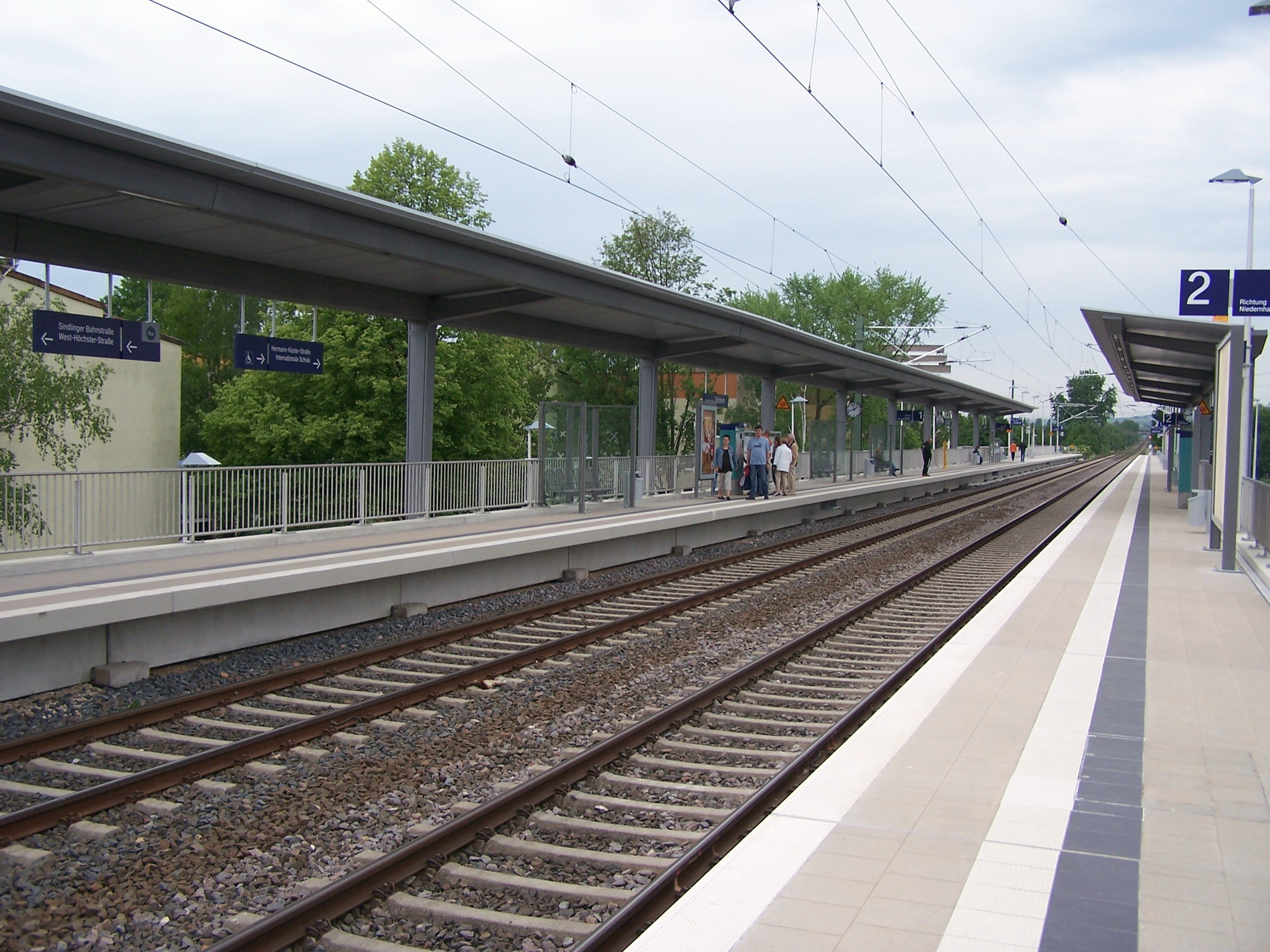
View of track1 (towards inner city)

The station is served by S-Bahn line S2, which runs between Niedernhausen and Dietzenbach. It operates on weekdays at 30-minute intervals, at 15-minute intervals during peak hours and hourly on weekends.

The station is classified as category 5 station.

=== Buses ===
In order to improve connections to the station, the entire bus network in the western part of Frankfurt was revised at the timetable change in December 2006. The adjacent bus stop is served by city bus lines 53 (to/from Bolongaro Palace in Höchst), 54 (Griesheim station) and 57 (Siedlung Taunusblick), which connect the station to centre of the district. Zeilsheim station is also served by the night bus line N8.
