= Centennial Hall (Frankfurt) =

Event venue in Unterliederbach (near Höchst), Frankfurt am Main, Germany

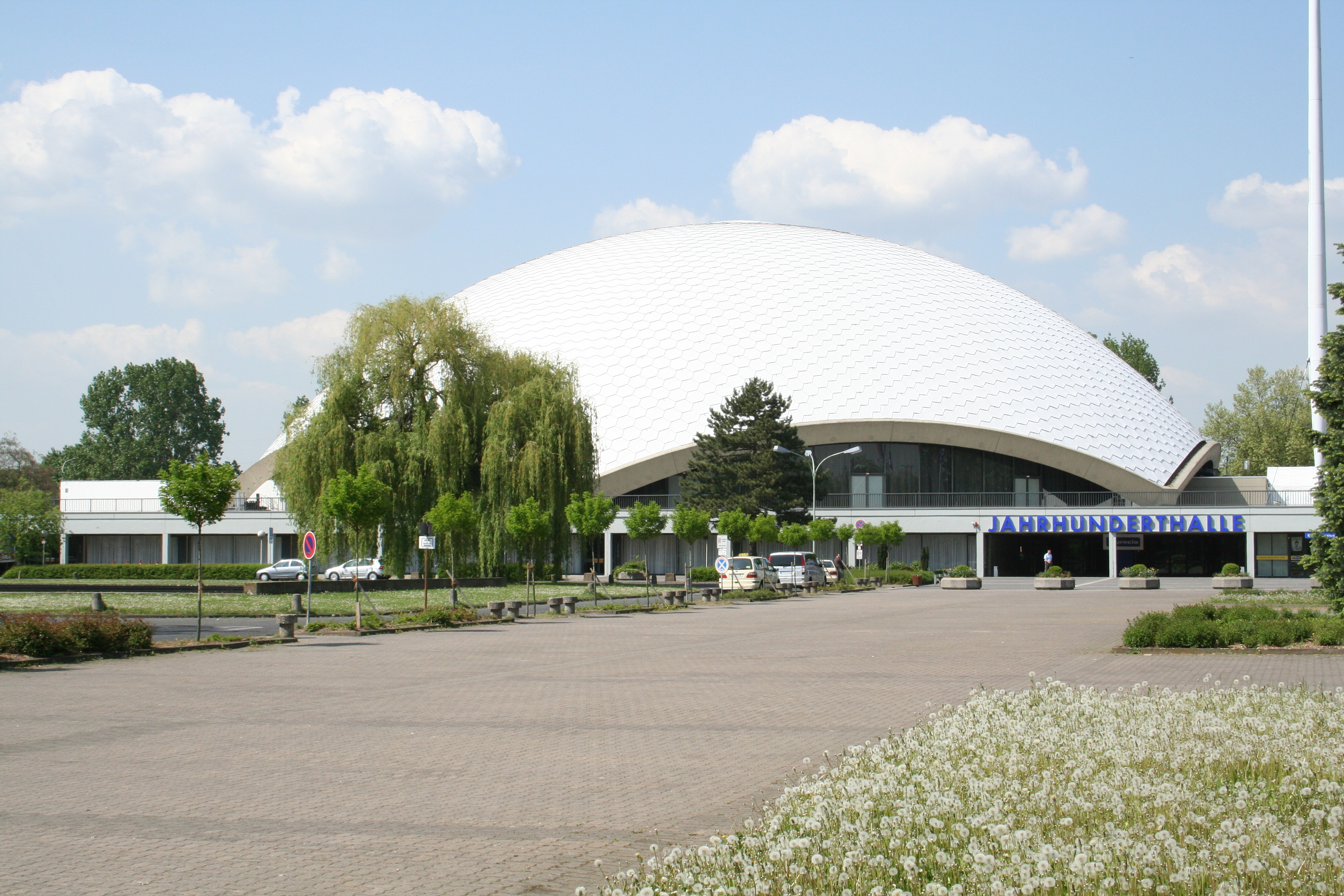
- Exterior view of venue (c.2006)
- Interactive map of Centennial Hall
- Former names: Jahrhunderthalle Hoechst (1963–99)
- Address: Pfaffenwiese 301; Frankfurt, Germany
- Location: Frankfurt-Unterliederbach
- Coordinates: 50°05′57″N 8°31′08″E
- Operator: DEAG Deutsche Entertainment
- Capacity: 4,800 (Kuppelsaal)
- Public transit: Farbwerke/Jahrhunderthalle (7 min); 53, 54 Jahrhunderthalle

Construction
- Groundbreaking: August 1961
- Opened: 11 January 1963
- Architects: Friedrich Wilhelm Kraemer; Ernst Sieverts
- Structural engineer: Beck-Gravert-Schneider

Website
- Venue Website

The Centennial Hall (Jahrhunderthalle) is a congress centre located in Frankfurt, Germany. The centre comprises an events hall, exhibition hall and conference centre, respectively known as Kuppelsaal, Kasino and Konferenzareal.

The venue, which was designed by architects Friedrich Wilhelm Kraemer and Ernst Sieverts, opened in 1963 and was built to celebrate the 100th anniversary of the founding of Hoechst AG.

Notable past performers include Jimi Hendrix, Janis Joplin, the Grateful Dead, James Brown, Ella Fitzgerald, Geolier, Louis Armstrong, and Duke Ellington.
