= FZH =

FZH may refer to:

- Faizabad, in India
- Frankfurt Zeilsheim station, in Germany
- Frizinghall railway station, in England
