= Frankfurt-Sindlingen station =

Railway station in Germany

Frankfurt Sindlingen
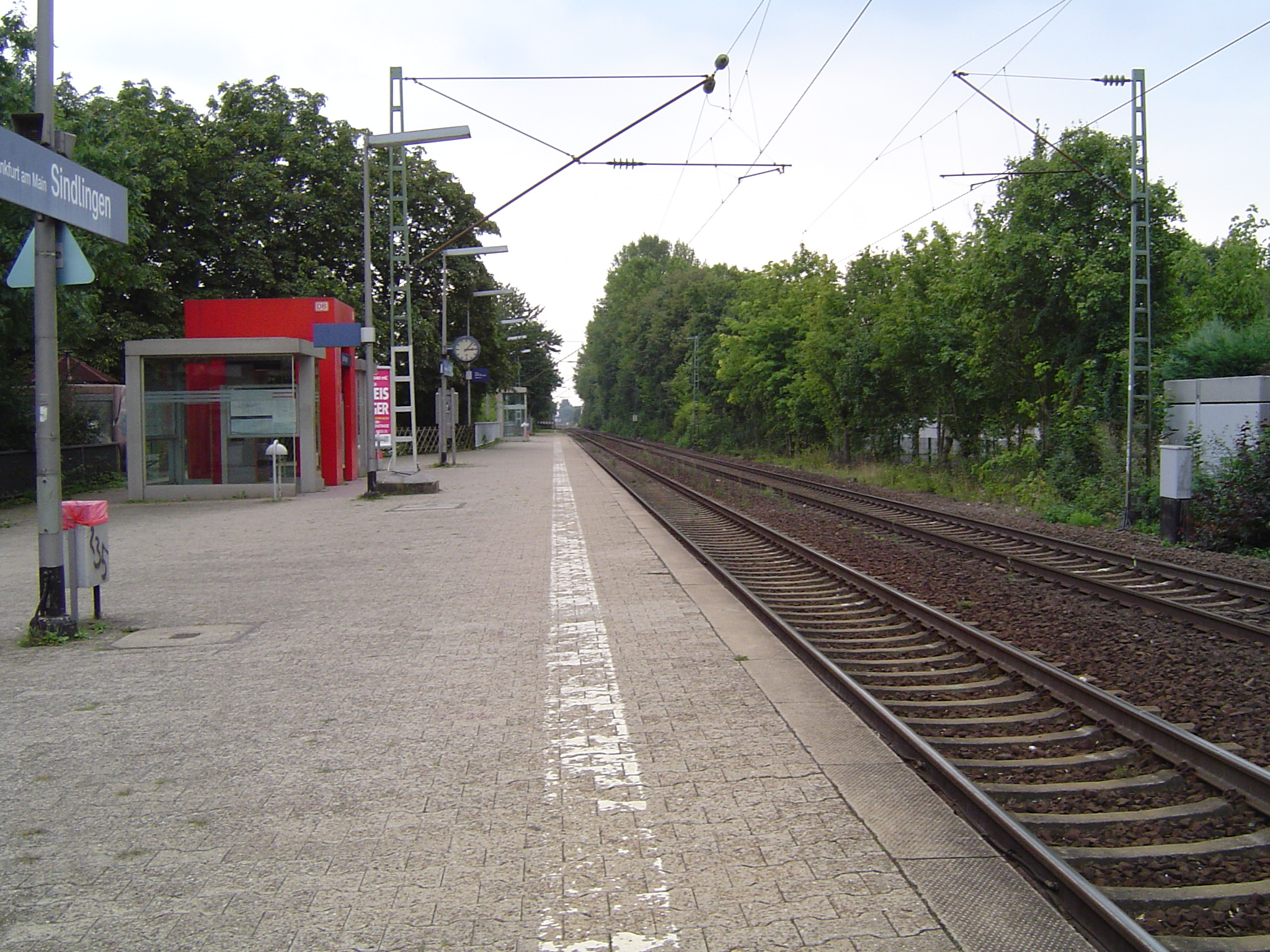
- Platform 1, towards the city

General information
- Location: Sindlingen, Hesse; Germany
- Coordinates: 50°5′15″N 8°30′44″E
- Lines: Taunus Railway (0.0 km) (KBS 645.1)
- Platforms: 2

Other information
- Station code: 1878
- DS100 code: FSIN
- Category: 5
- Fare zone: : 5011
- Website: www.bahnhof.de

History
- Opened: 1893

Services
Preceding station	Rhine-Main S-Bahn	Following station
Hattersheim towards Wiesbaden Hbf	S1 (Rhine-Main S-Bahn)	Höchst Farbwerke towards Rödermark-Ober Roden
Location

Frankfurt-Sindlingen station is a suburban station on the network of the Rhine-Main S-Bahn in the district of Sindlingen in the German city of Frankfurt. The station is classified by Deutsche Bahn as a category 5 station.

== Location ==
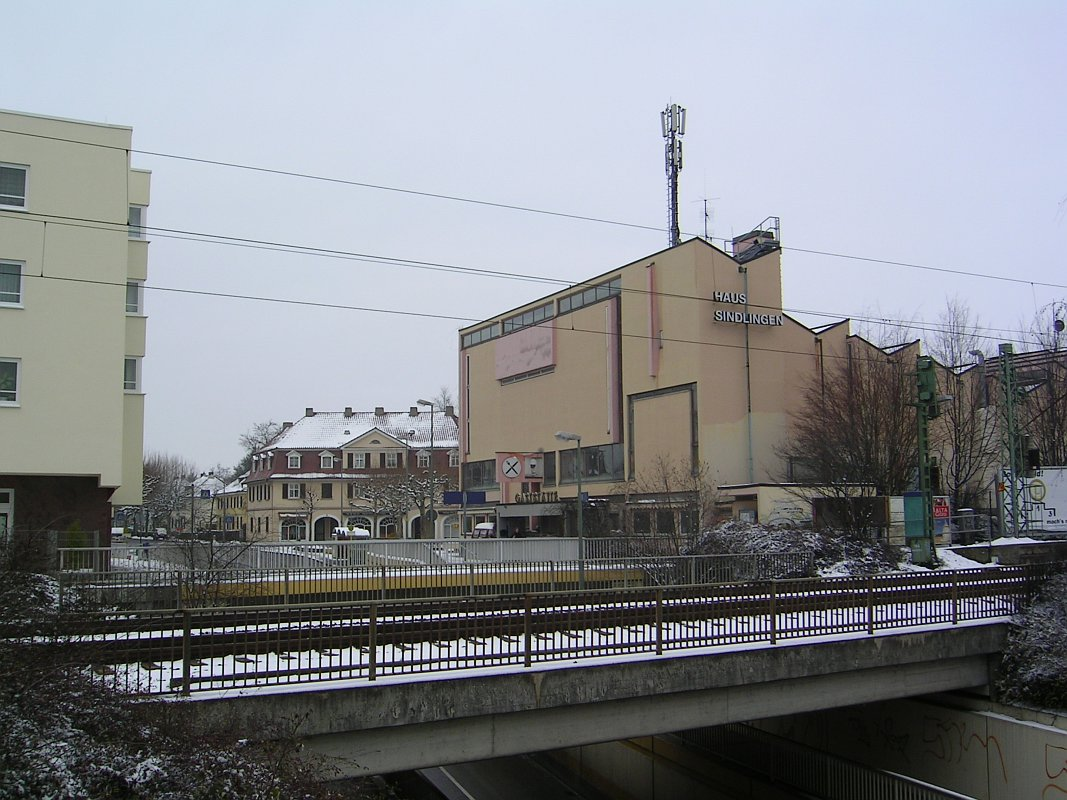
View from the southern pedestrian bridge

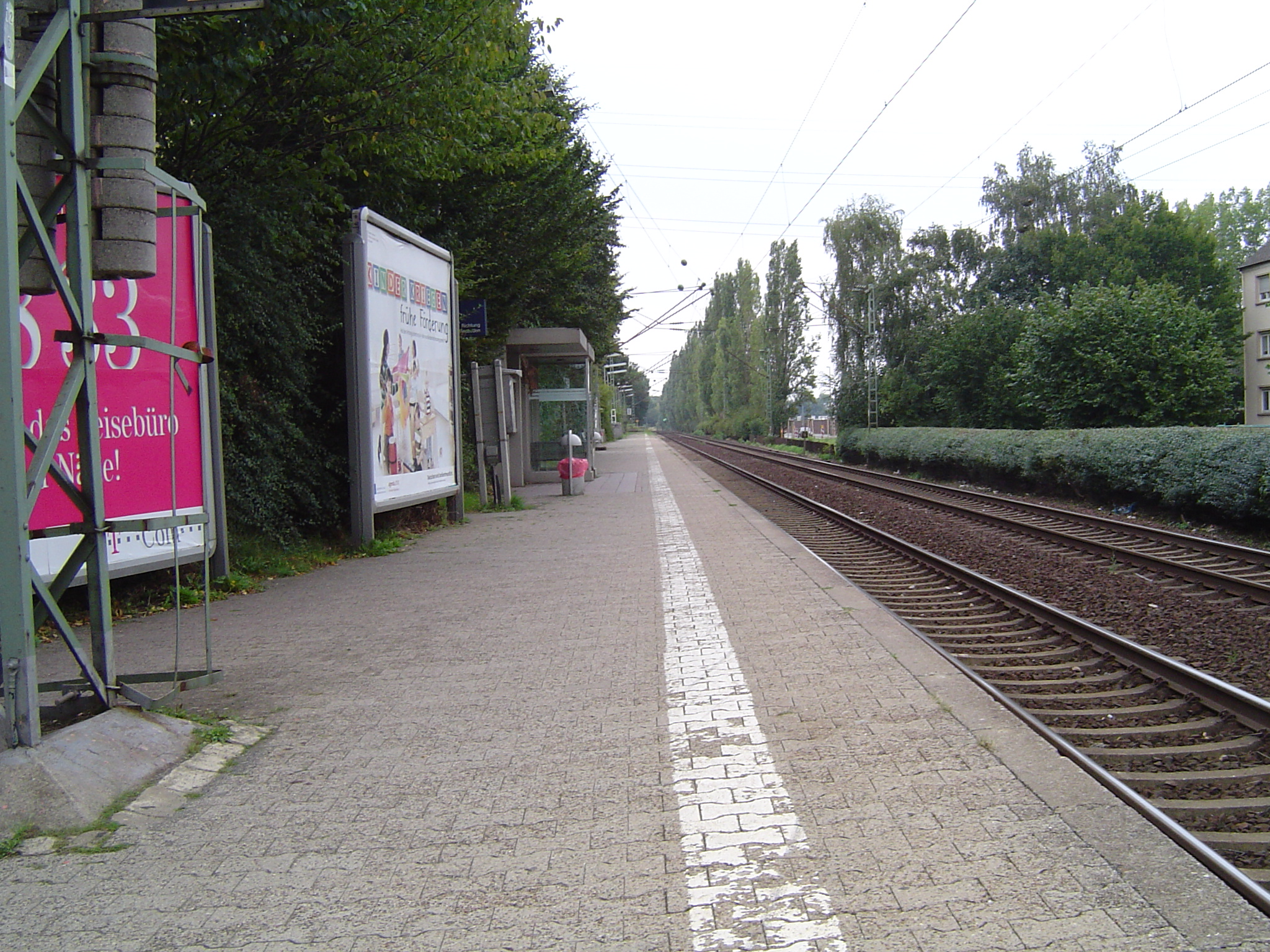
Platform 2 (from the city)

The S-Bahn station is located in the centre of the Frankfurt district of Sindlingen in the state of Hesse. The station is located where the main street of the suburb, Sindlinger Bahnstraße, passes under the Taunus Railway (German: Taunus-Eisenbahn). To the north of the platform is a municipal building called the Haus Sindlingen ("Sindlingen House"), which is used as a community centre and library. It was used for a trial of members of the Red Army Faction, including Astrid Proll, in 1973–74.

== History ==
In the 19th century the northern and central parts of Sindlingen were undeveloped. The rural town had just 750 inhabitants. The Taunus Railway, which was opened between Höchst and Hattersheim on 24 November 1839, ran through this area and crossed the highway to Zeilsheim (now called Sindlinger Bahnstraße, literally "Sindlingen railway street"). The progressive industrialisation of the area, in particular the growth of the factories of Hoechst AG, caused considerable population growth in Sindlingen and the surrounding villages. Eventually stations would be built in the district on the Taunus Railway and the Main-Lahn Railway, which was opened a little further north in 1877, although the northern station was not completed for more than a century.

In 1893, the station was opened with the name of Sindlingen-Zeilsheim at the level crossing on Sindlinger Bahnstraße. The station building was replaced by a new one in 1968, which, however, was completely burned down on 29 February 1984 after an explosion. In 1974, the Frankfurter Verkehrs- und Tarifverbund (Frankfurt Transport and Fares Association, the predecessor of the Rhein-Main-Verkehrsverbund) introduced S-Bahn-like operations on the line, operating as line R 1; this was replaced by line S 1 in 1978. A major change came in 1980 when the level crossing was replaced by an underpass.

In 2007, the long-planned Frankfurt-Zeilsheim station was opened on the Main-Lahn Railway, 500 metres further north, also on Sindlinger Bahnstraße.

== Design ==
The architecture of the station is similar to the Frankfurt-Nied station. In contrast, however, the northern and southern platforms are on the opposite sides of Sindlinger Bahnstraße. Access to the platforms is via a pedestrian underpass that crosses the railway tracks parallel with and at the same level as the road underpass. In order to cross the road there are two pedestrian overbridges that run parallel on either side of the railway bridge. As well as the main entrances from Sindlinger Bahnstraße, there are additional external entrance from park and ride car parks.

The platforms built after the old station building was destroyed in 1984 are very austere, but the so-called “DB-Plus” point provides waiting passengers with a shelter.

== Operations ==
The only trains that stops at Frankfurt-Sindlingen station is S-Bahn line S 1 running between Rödermark-Ober Roden and Wiesbaden every 30 minutes during the day, every 15 minutes during peak hours and every 60 minutes during quite periods. Being close to the western gate of Industriepark Höchst (Höchst Industrial Park) and the Internationale Schule Frankfurt Rhein-Main, it is very busy during peak hours.

The station is also served by bus routes 53 towards the Bolongaro Palace and the Sindlingen cemetery, bus route 57 towards Siedlung Taunusblick, X53 to Frankfurt Intl Airport and bus M55 to Rodelheim. Also, close by is the M54 bus route between Sindlingen and Hochts.

Access from the platform onto the train can be difficult for those with limited mobility due to the difference between the train and the lower platform (-20 cm difference)

Sindlingen is classified by the Deutsche Bahn as a category 5 station.
