= FSIN =

FSIN may refer to:

- Federal Penitentiary Service (Russian: Федеральная служба исполнения наказаний, romanized: Federalnaya Sluzhba Ispolneniya Nakazaniy), a federal agency of the Ministry of Justice of Russia
- Federation of Sovereign Indigenous Nations, a First Nations organization based in Saskatchewan, Canada
- Frankfurt-Sindlingen station by Deutsche Bahn station code
- Floating-point sine in the x86 instruction set
