= Frankfurt-Höchst Farbwerke station =

Railway station in Frankfurt, Germany

Frankfurt Höchst Farbwerke
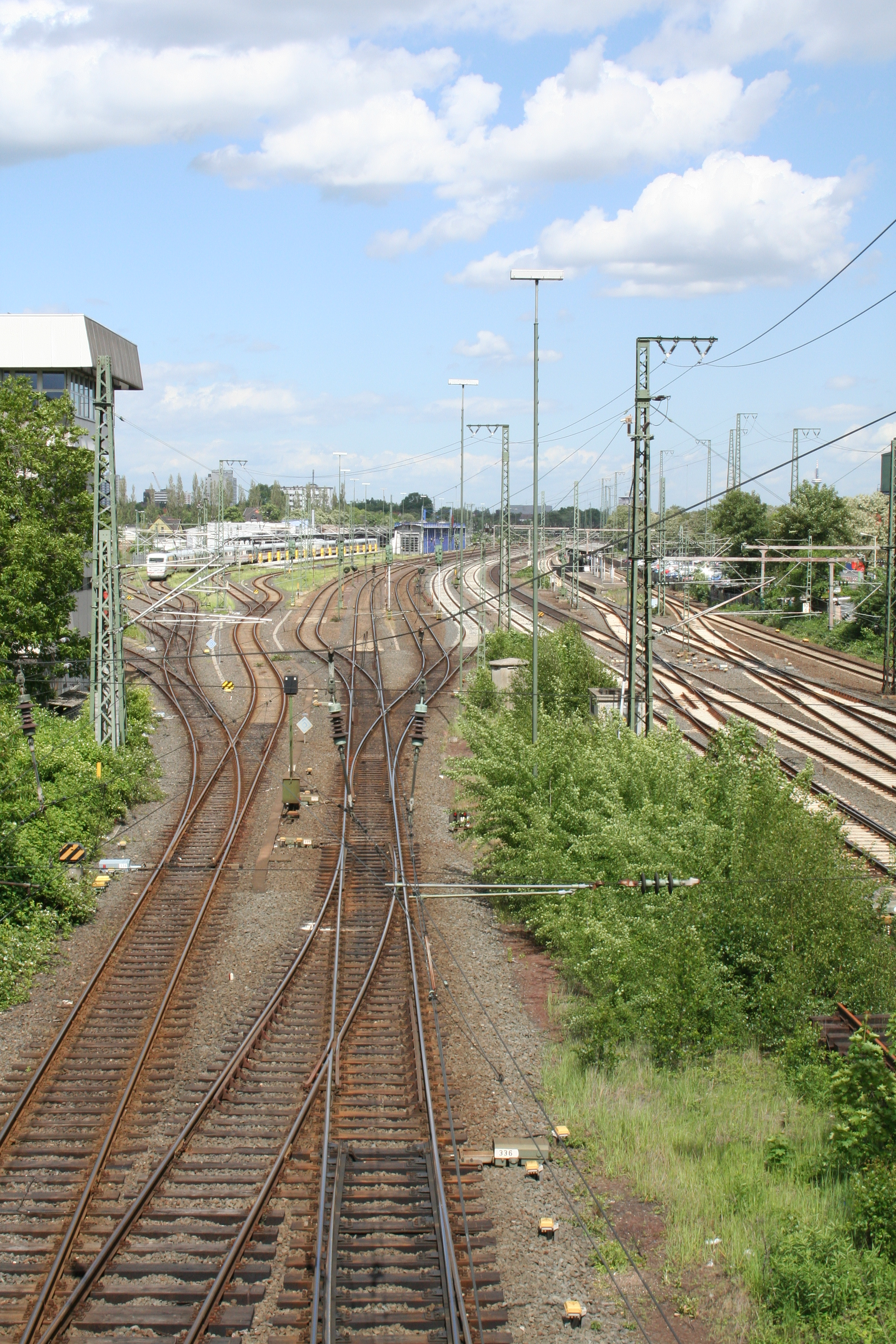
- Track field, freight yard and Farbwerke station

General information
- Location: Höchster Farbenstr. 1, Höchst, Hesse; Germany
- Coordinates: 50°5′54″N 8°31′41″E
- Lines: Main-Lahn Railway (10.4 km) (KBS 627/645.2); Taunus Railway (10.4 km) (KBS 645.1)
- Platforms: 2

Construction
- Accessible: No

Other information
- Station code: 1763
- DS100 code: FFAW
- IBNR: 8002051
- Category: 5
- Fare zone: : 5013
- Website: www.bahnhof.de

History
- Opened: 1967

Services
Preceding station	Rhine-Main S-Bahn	Following station
Sindlingen towards Wiesbaden Hbf	S1 (Rhine-Main S-Bahn)	Höchst towards Rödermark-Ober Roden
Zeilsheim towards Niedernhausen	S2 (Rhine-Main S-Bahn)	Höchst towards Dietzenbach
Location
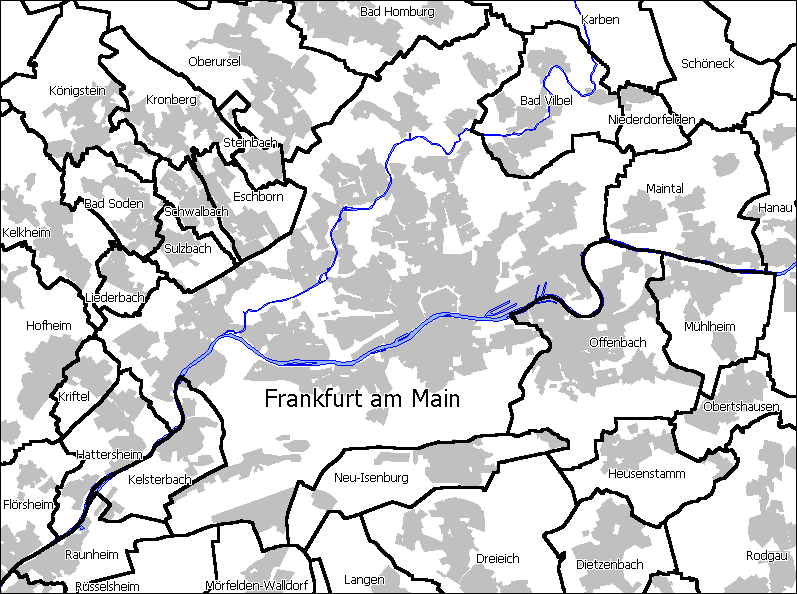
- Location within Frankfurt am Main Location within Hesse Location within Germany Location within Europe

Frankfurt-Höchst Farbwerke station is a station in the district of Höchst of the city of Frankfurt in the German state of Hesse on the Main-Lahn Railway. It is now served by lines S1 and S 2 of the Rhine-Main S-Bahn. The station is classified by Deutsche Bahn as a category 5 station. Although the city of Höchst was incorporated in Frankfurt in 1928, the official name of the station from its opening in 1967 was Farbwerke Hoechst ("Hoechst dye works"), but since the closure of the dye works, the station has been renamed Frankfurt-Höchst Farbwerke.

== Location ==
Before the current station was built, there had been a station called Farbwerke on the Königstein Railway, which had a pedestrian connection to the dye works over a long steel bridge, known as the Eiserner Steg ("Iron Bridge"), after a more famous pedestrian bridge in central Frankfurt.

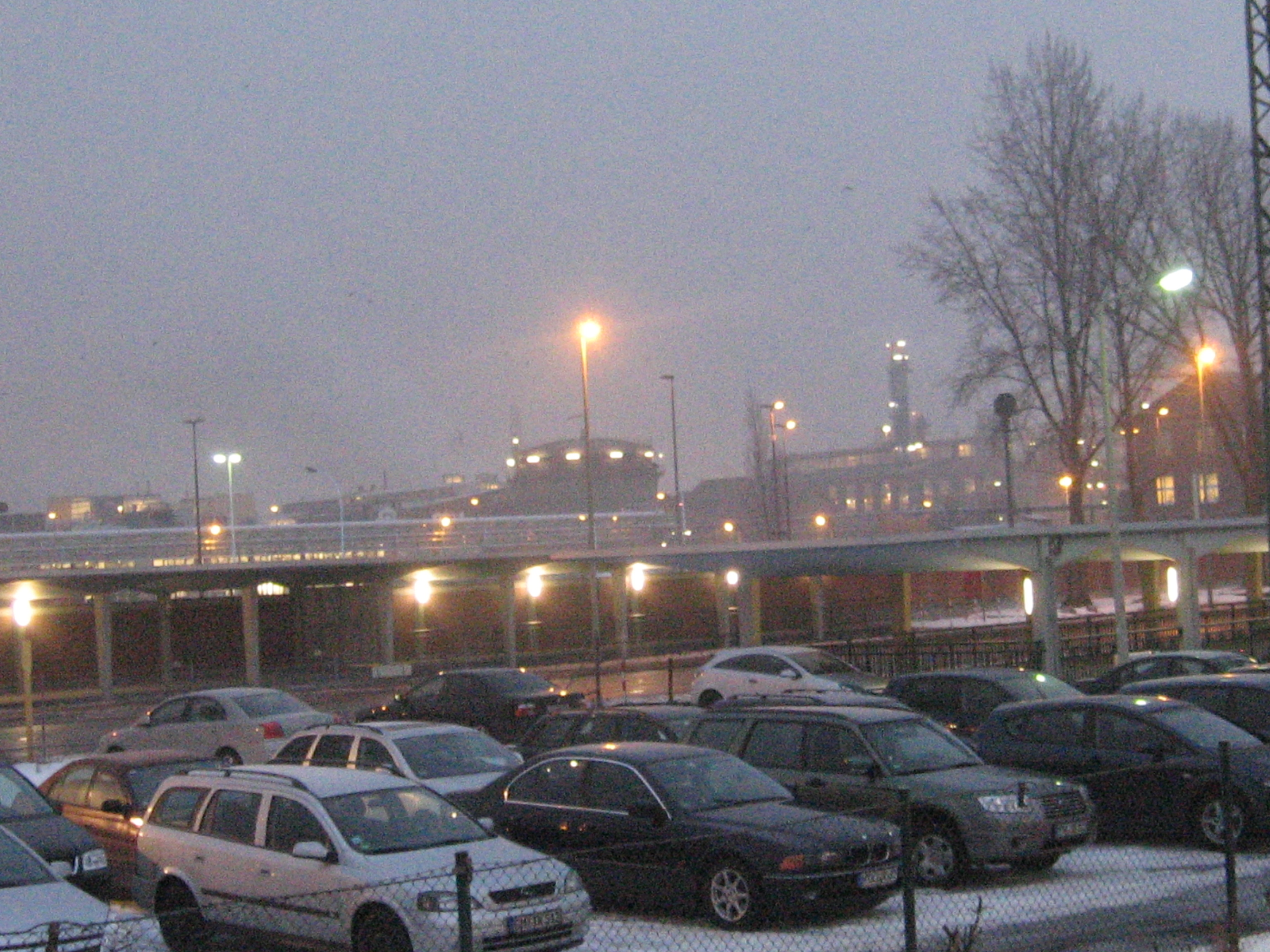
The dye works seen from Frankfurt-Höchst Farbwerke station

The current station was built in 1967 at the northern gate of the Höchst Industrial Park (Industriepark Höchst) and in 1978 it was incorporated into the S-Bahn network. The new platform is only accessible via a pedestrian tunnel, which has three entrances: two public entrances on both sides of the street of Hoechster-Farben-Straße, on which the Industriepark Höchst Tor Nord (“Höchst Industrial Park North Gate”) bus stop is located, and a private entrance on the grounds of the industrial park.

In addition to its use by employees of the Industrial Park the station also benefits from its proximity to the Centennial Hall (Jahrhunderthalle), which is used for concerts and conferences, and the Fraport Arena.

The pushbutton signal box of Frankfurt-Hoechst station is also in the platform area. It is responsible for controlling signalling and points at the stations of Frankfurt-Höchst, Frankfurt-Sindlingen, Hattersheim (Main), Frankfurt-Zeilsheim and Kriftel.

In the immediate vicinity of the station, north of the through tracks, there is a maintenance centre for passenger trains, including a washing facility.

== Architecture ==
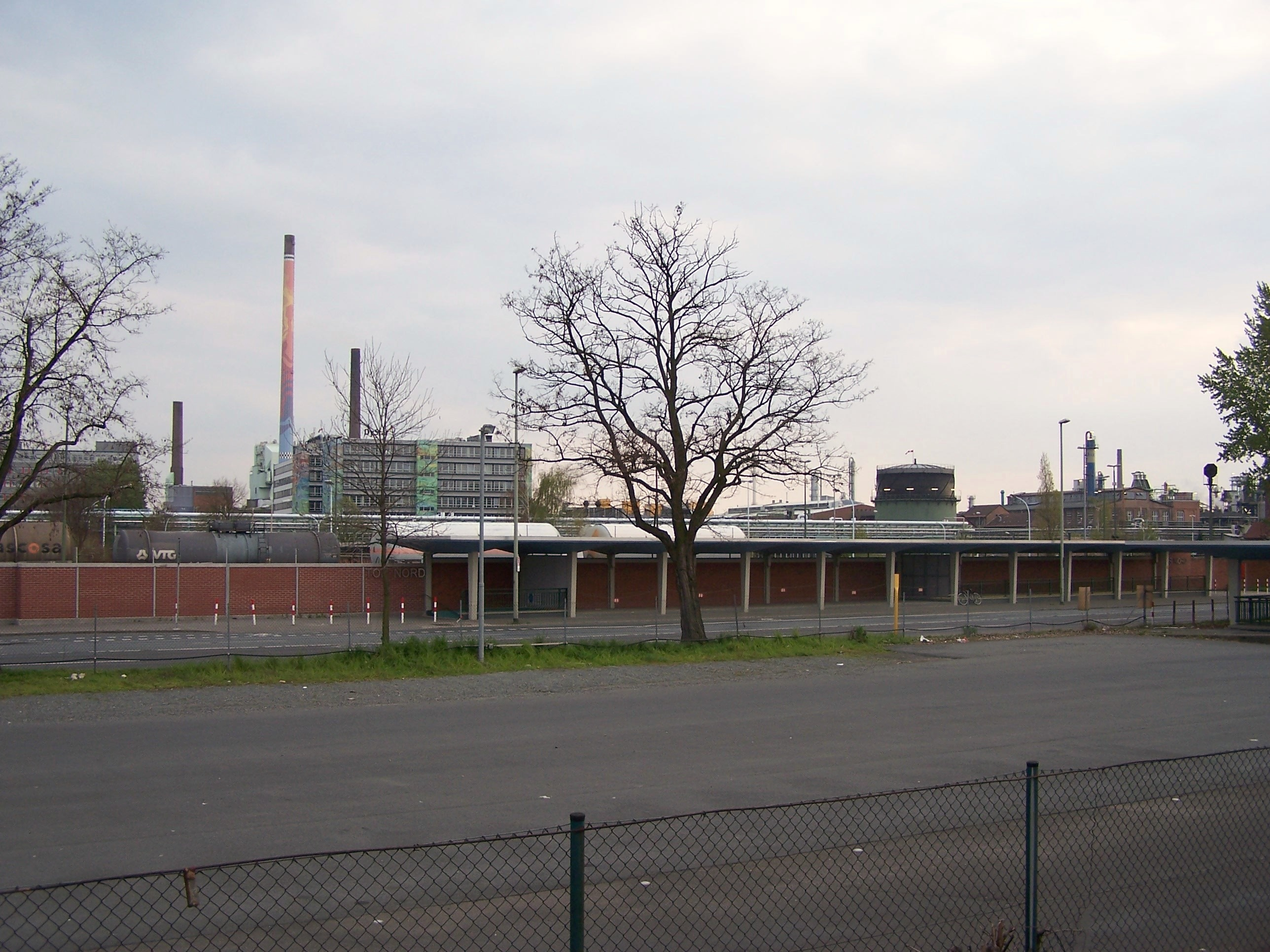
Industrial Park south of Hoechster-Farben-Straße from the platform

While the actual platform, which has remained virtually unchanged for 40 years, has little architectural merit, the two entrance buildings in Hoechster-Farben-Straße were temporarily listed in the heritage list of the state of Hesse. The access tunnel was recently remodelled and since then it has been under video surveillance.

== Operations ==
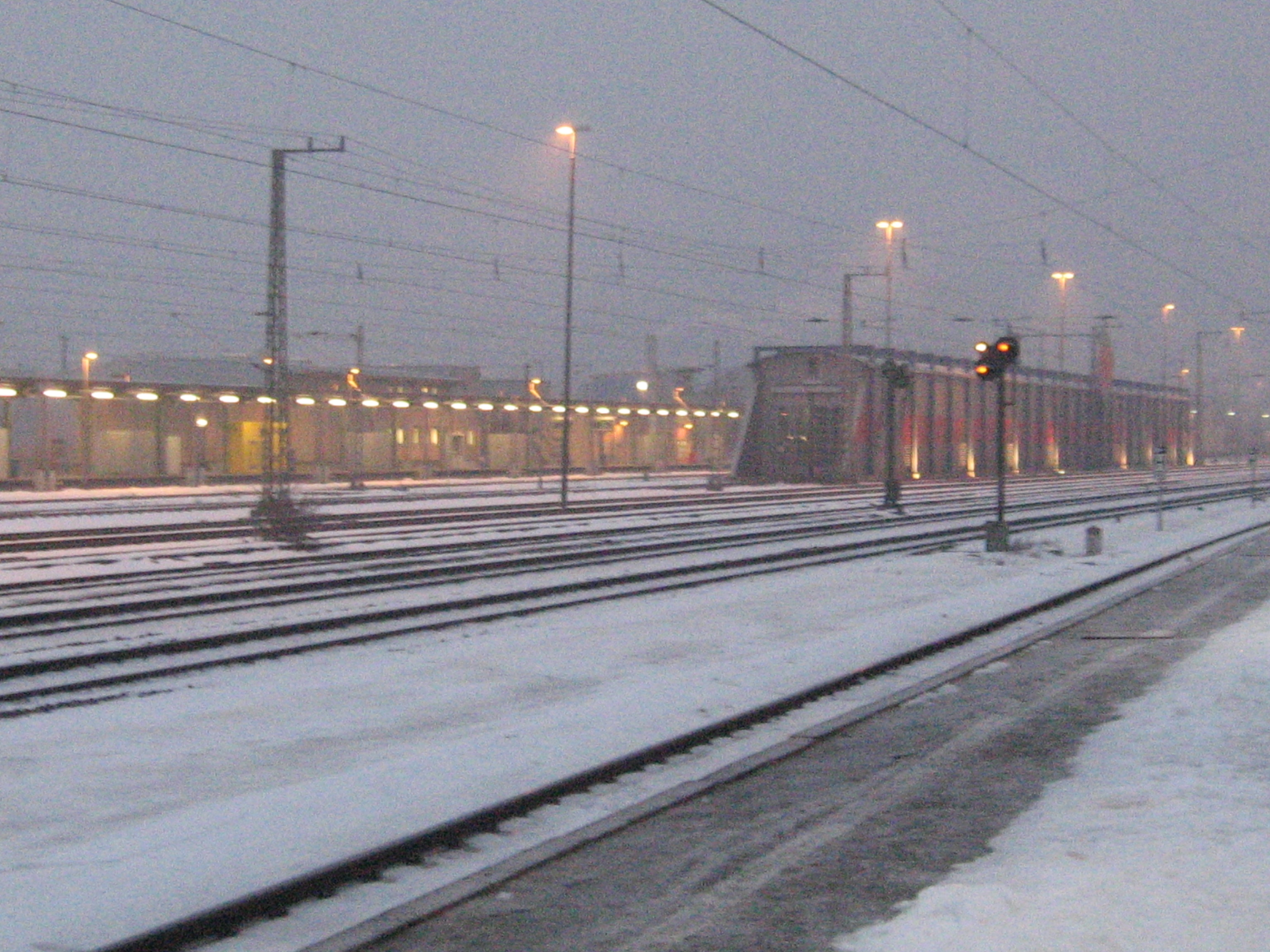
Track field

The station is served by S-Bahn lines S 1 and S 2, which operate on different routes further west. Four times a day regional services operating as SE 20 (Main-Lahn-Bahn) stop at Frankfurt-Höchst Farbwerke station to give a faster trip to commuters from the Taunus. The adjacent bus stop is served by municipal bus line 53 (Höchst Zuckschwerdtstraße–Zeilsheim–Sindlingen cemetery) and 55 (Rödelheim station–Sindlingen cemetery). The station is classified as a category 5 station.
