= Höchst (Frankfurt am Main) =

Neighbourhood and market town in Frankfurt am Main, Hesse, Germany

- Quarter of Frankfurt am Main
- Coat of arms

- Location of Höchst (red) and the West Ortsbezirk (light red) within Frankfurt am Main
- Interactive map of Höchst
- Location within Germany Location within Hesse
- Coordinates: 50°05′56″N 08°32′48″E
- Country: Germany
- State: Hesse
- Admin. region: Darmstadt
- District: Urban district
- City: Frankfurt am Main

Area
  - Total: 4.709 km^{2} (1.818 sq mi)

Population (2020-12-31)
  - Total: 16,103
  - Density: 3,420/km^{2} (8,857/sq mi)
- Time zone: UTC+01:00 (CET)
  - Summer (DST): UTC+02:00 (CEST)
- Postal codes: 65929
- Dialling codes: 069
- Vehicle registration: F
- Website: www.frankfurt.de

Höchst (German pronunciation: [ˈhøːçst]) is a neighbourhood and market town in the Ortsbezirk of Frankfurt-West in Frankfurt am Main, Germany. Höchst is situated 10 kilometres (6.2 mi) west of Frankfurt city centre, on the north bank of the Main at the confluence with the River Nidda. Its old town is famous for around 400 timber framed houses.

On 1 July 1917, Sindlingen, Unterliederbach and Zeilsheim were incorporated to Höchst am Main. In 1928 Höchst became incorporated into Frankfurt am Main, along with Sindlingen, Unterliederbach and Zeilsheim. The well-preserved old city with its 400 half-timbered houses has been under the Denkmalschutz protection law since 1972. An important cultural event is the folklore festival, the Höchster Schloßfest, that brings many visitors to Höchst. It begins in the middle of June and last four weeks. It includes a festival in the old city, fireworks, and a jazz festival in the castle.

== History ==
=== Middle Ages ===
Höchst was first recorded as Hostat (meaning high site or high place). On 11 February 1355, Höchst received its town privileges by emperor Charles IV. In a charter dated 12 January 1356, Charles IV gave additional privileges to Höchst including the right to hold markets every Tuesday.

On 22 June 1622, during the Thirty Years' War, the Battle of Höchst saw a Catholic League and Spanish Empire armies defeat a Protestant force. A second Battle of Höchst occurred on 11 October 1795 when Habsburg soldiers clashed with Republican French troops.

=== The fires ===
In 1586, the first major fire in Höchst occurred. The fire destroyed 56 houses, 25 barns, the town hall, the bath house and the Mainz Gate, which was half the town at the time.

=== 20th century ===
Höchst am Main became part of Frankfurt am Main in 1928. Until 1987, Höchst was the administrative seat of an independent Landkreis. Höchst is now the center of the Frankfurt-West Ortsbezirk (administrative district) with 135,000 residents.

== Economy ==
The name Höchst became known throughout the world for the chemical and pharmaceutical corporation Hoechst AG which was established in 1863. The Hoechst AG was headquartered in Höchst until in 1999, when the company was merged with the French Rhône-Poulenc S.A. and became Aventis which, after another merger, became Sanofi-Aventis. Major research and production activities of the company continue to be conducted in Höchst. The site of the Hoechst works is now operated as the Höchst Industrial Park (Industriepark Höchst). It includes a notable expressionist building designed by Peter Behrens, the Technical Administration Building (Technische Verwaltungsgebäude).

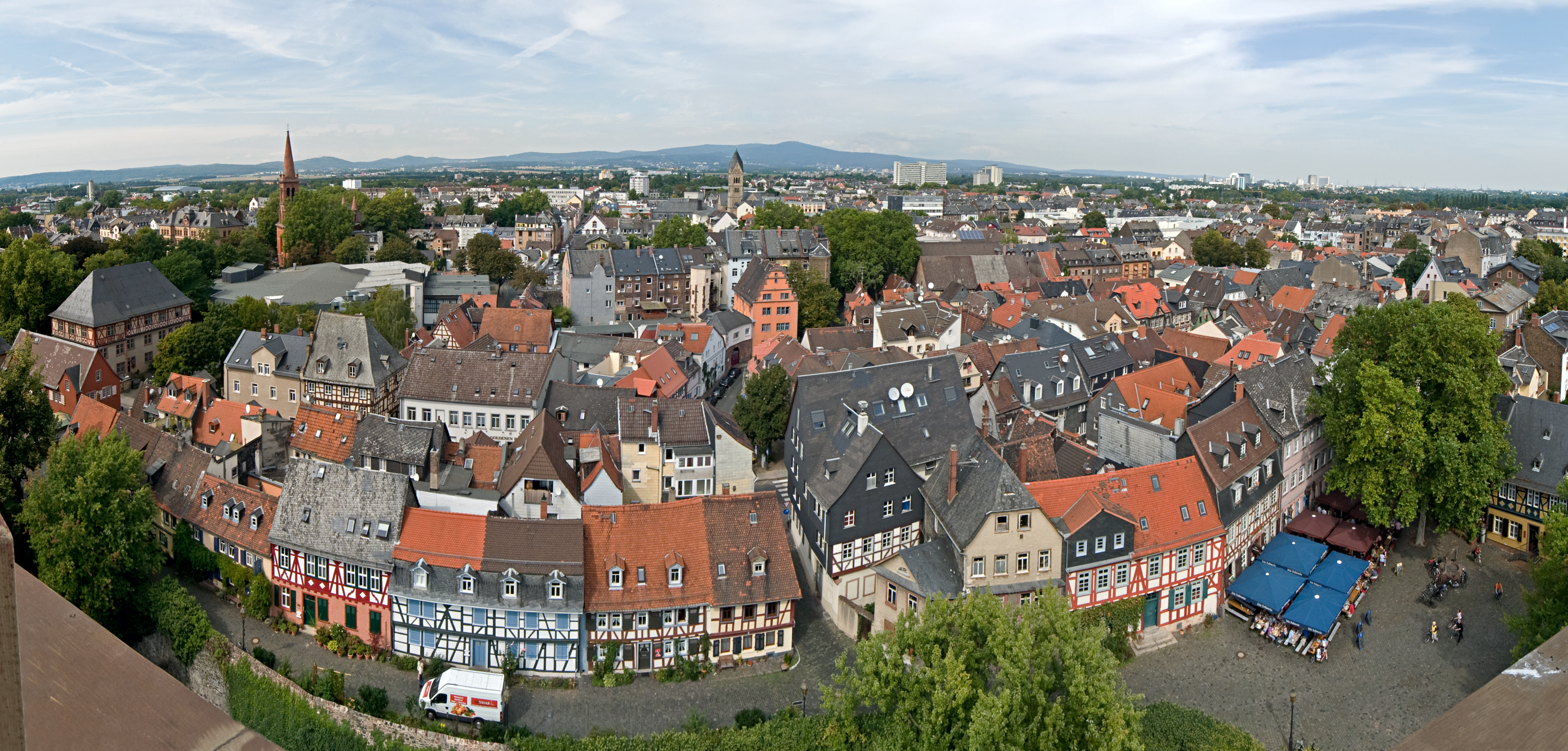
Timber-framed houses of the old town

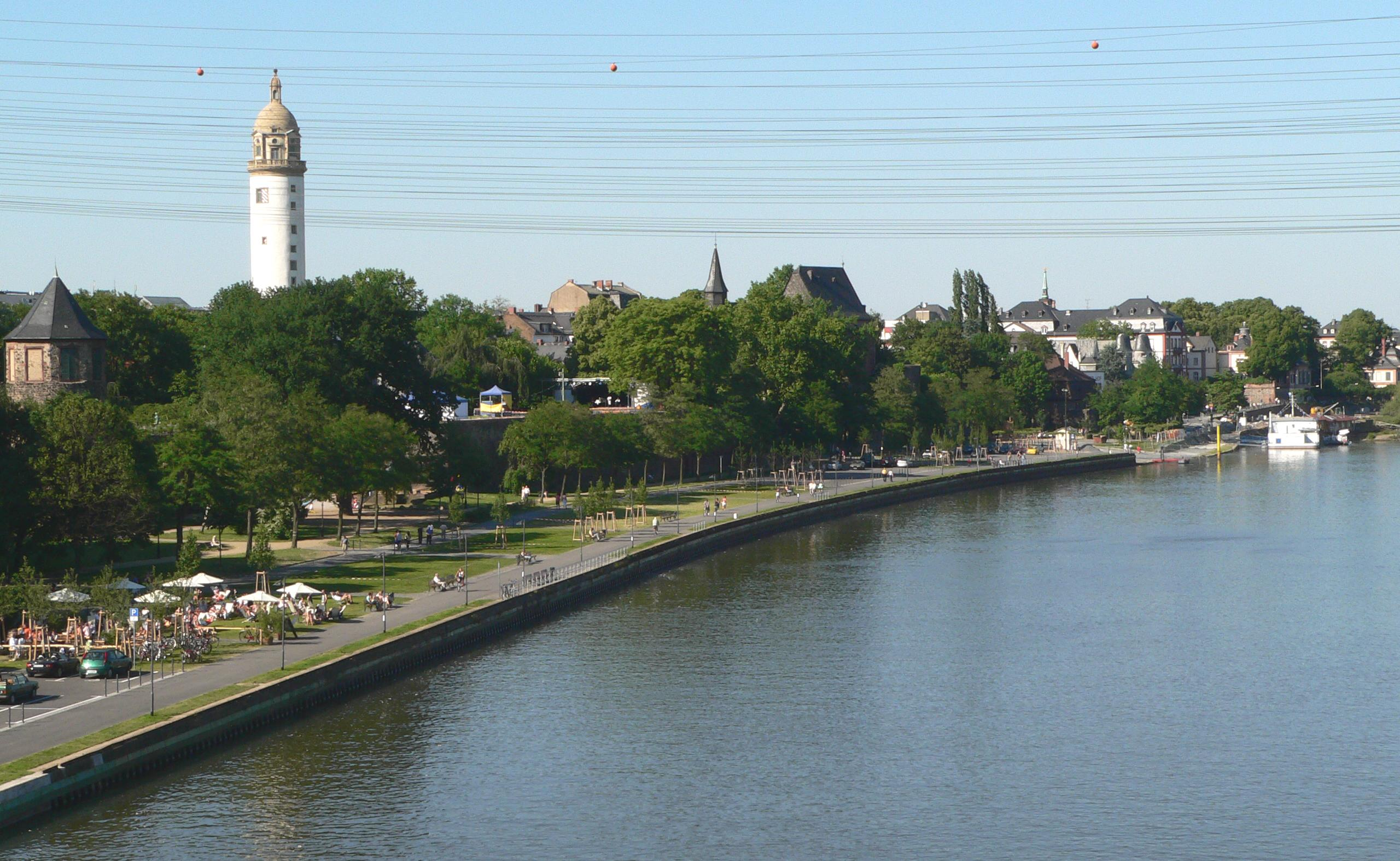
Main river bank in Höchst, called "Batterie"

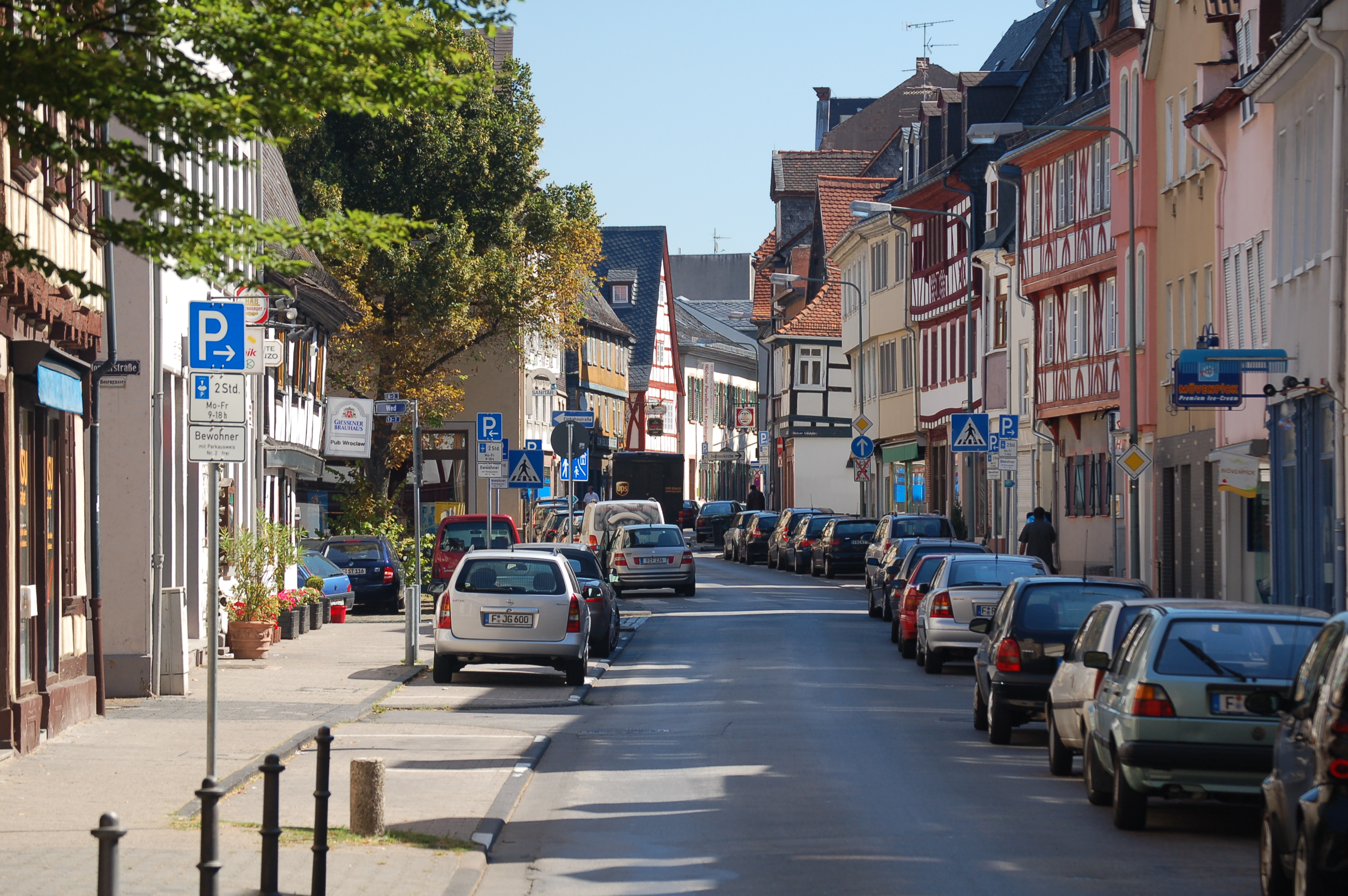
Bolongarostraße in Höchst

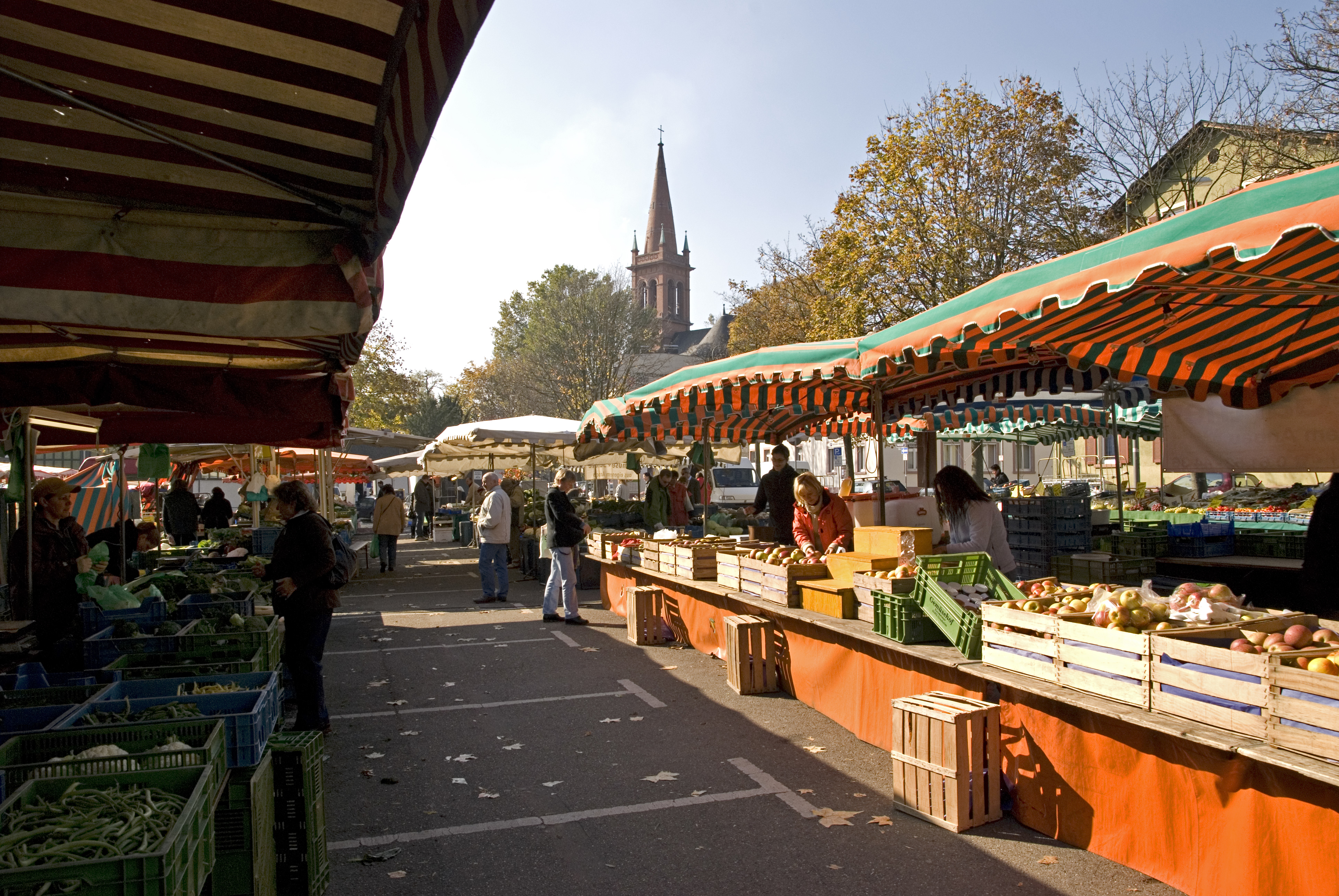
October 2008: Market in Höchst

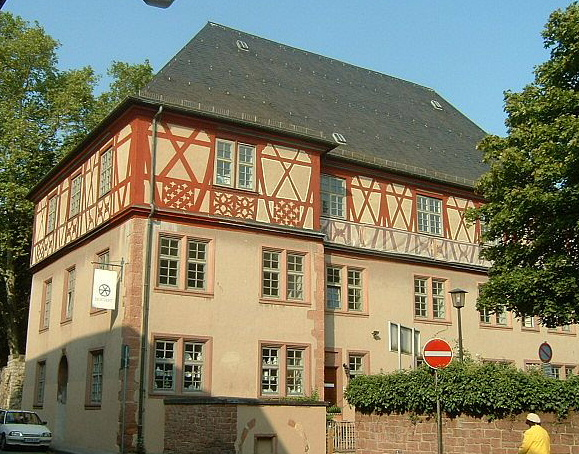
Porcelain manufacturer in the Dalberghouse

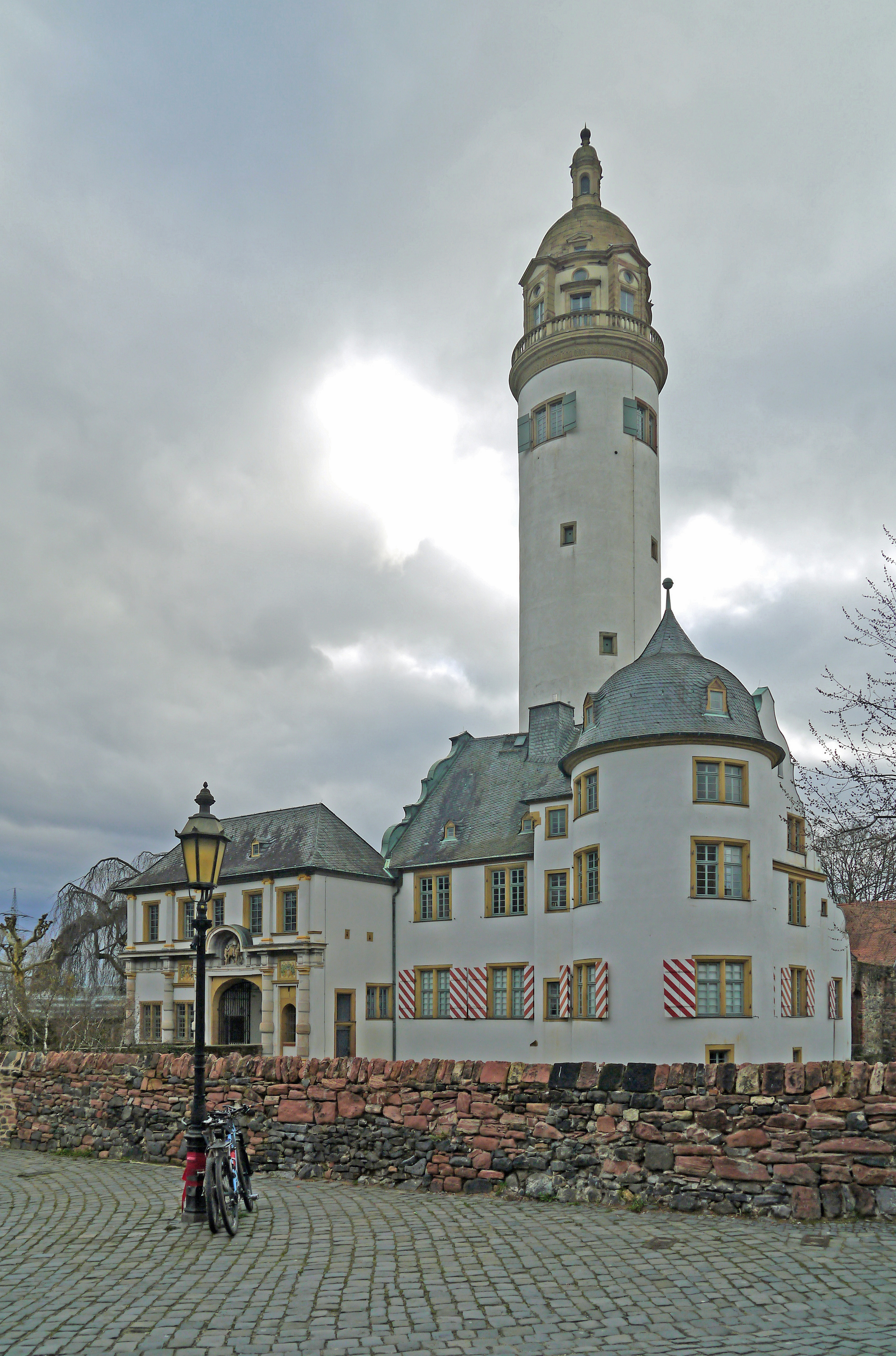
Höchster Schloss

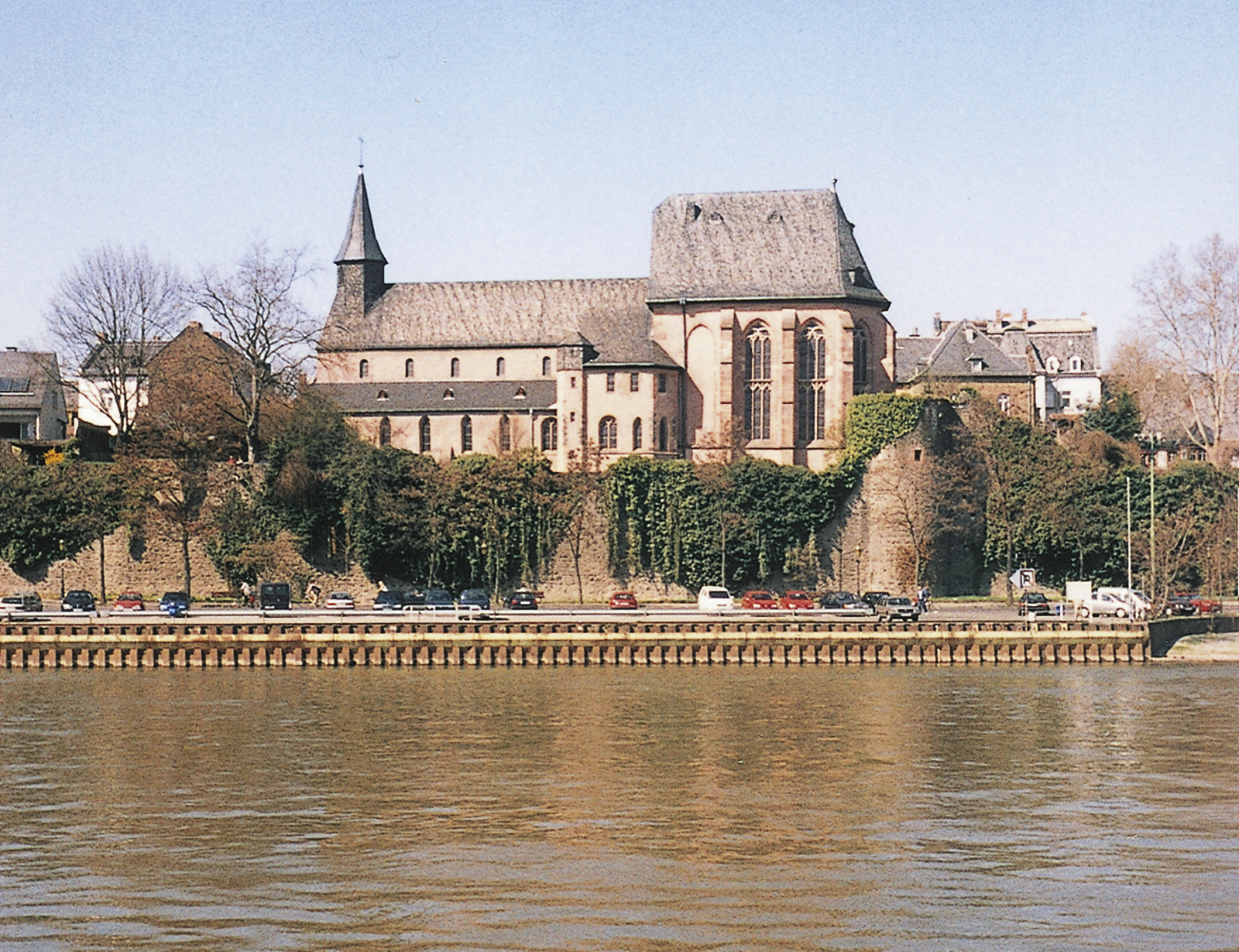
Saint Justin's Church, Frankfurt-Höchst

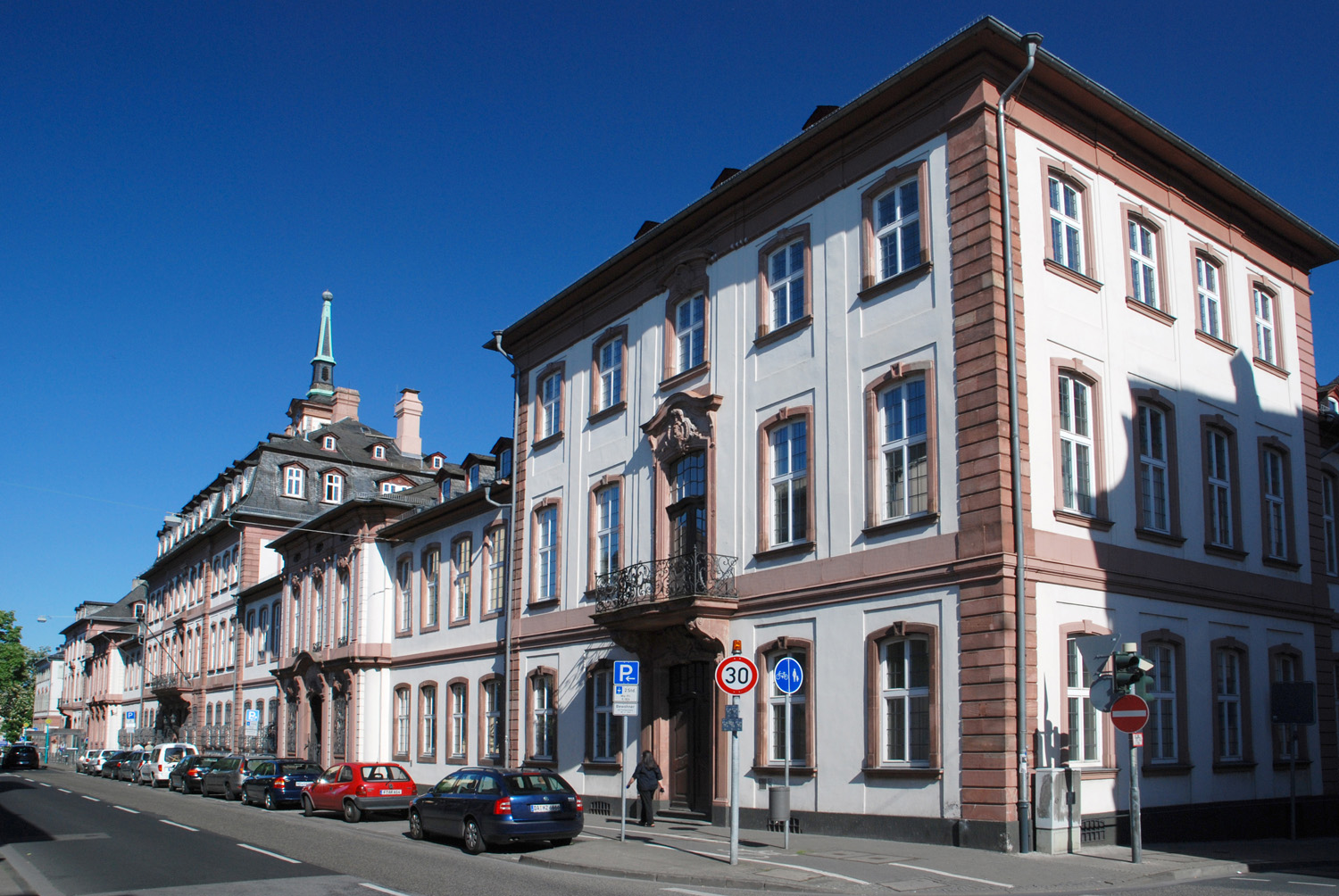
Bolongaropalast

== Transportation ==
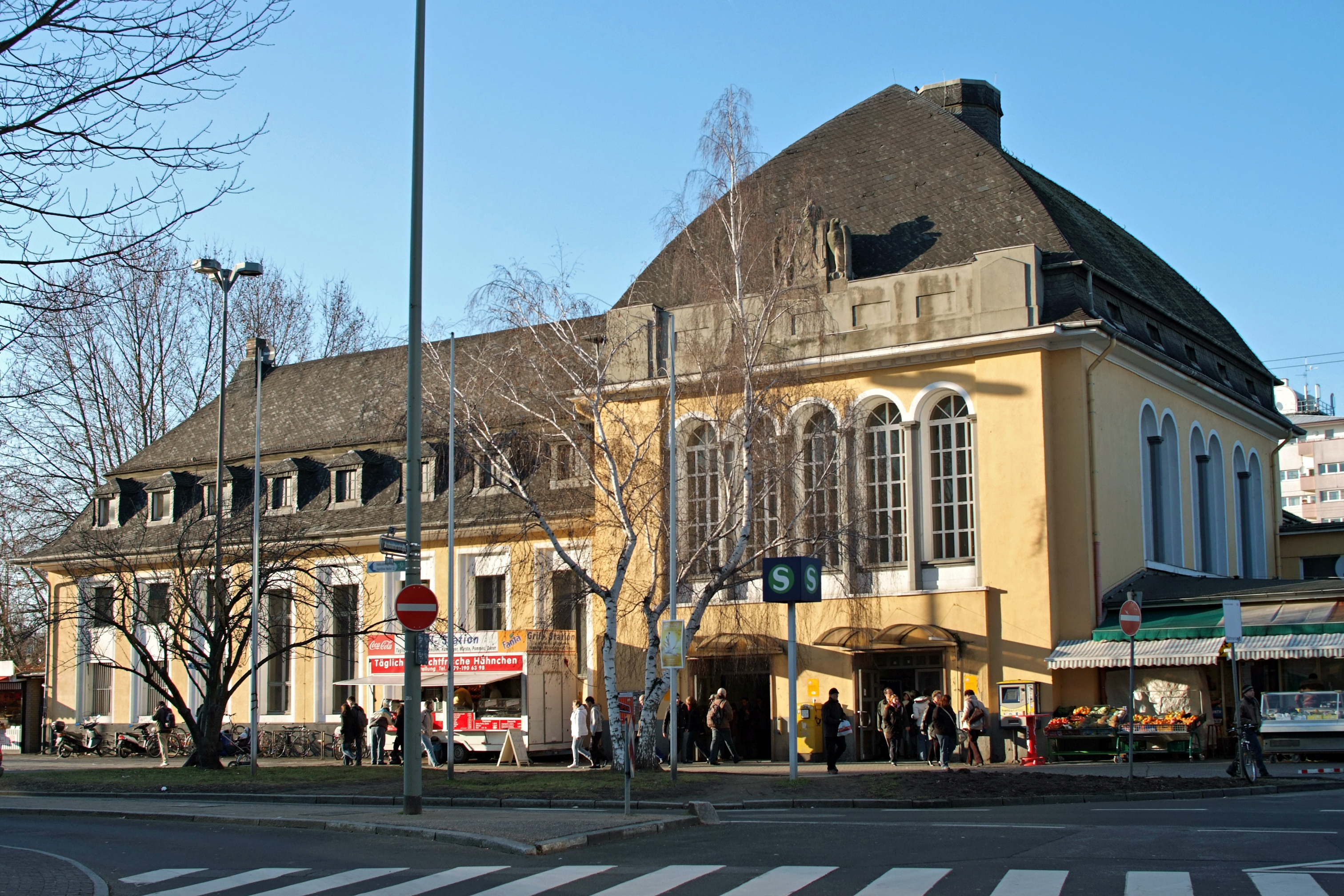
Frankfurt Höchst Station

Höchst is served by two railway stations, Frankfurt-Höchst station and Frankfurt-Höchst Farbwerke station which are both located on the S1 and S2 lines of the Rhine-Main S-Bahn and see frequent service to Downtown Frankfurt, Wiesbaden and other regional destinations.

Bundesautobahn 66 passes near Höchst

== Notable people ==
- Joseph Aschbach (1801-1882), historian well known for his studies on the Visigoths.
- Tristan Brübach (1984–1998), murder victim.
- Carl Chun (1852–1914), German marine biologist, born in Höchst.
- Hans Fischer (1881–1945), recipient of 1930 Nobel Prize for Chemistry.
- Mahide Lein (born 1949), LGBTQ+ activist
