= Joseph Aschbach =

German historian (1801–1882)

Joseph Ritter von Aschbach
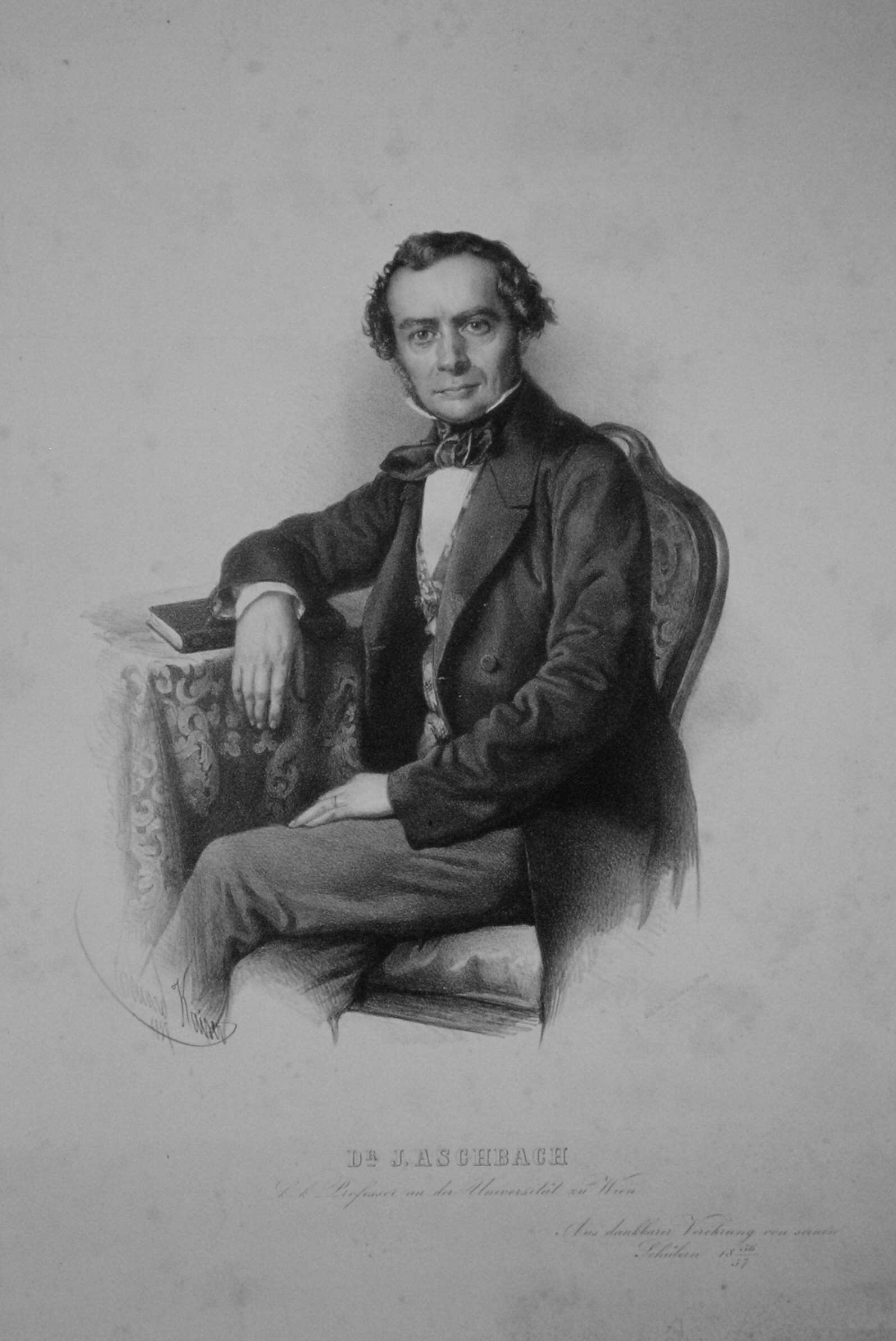
- Born: Joseph Aschbach; April 29, 1801; Höchst (Frankfurt am Main)
- Died: April 25, 1882; Vienna
- Occupation: Historian
- Known for: "Geschichte der Westgoten" ("History of the Visigoths")
- Awards: Ennobled (1870)

Academic background
- Education: University of Heidelberg
- Academic advisor: Friedrich Christoph Schlosser

Academic work
- Era: 19th century
- Discipline: History
- Sub-discipline: Visigothic history
- Institutions: Gymnasium of Frankfurt, University of Bonn, University of Vienna
- Main interests: Visigoths
- Notable works: Geschichte der Westgoten

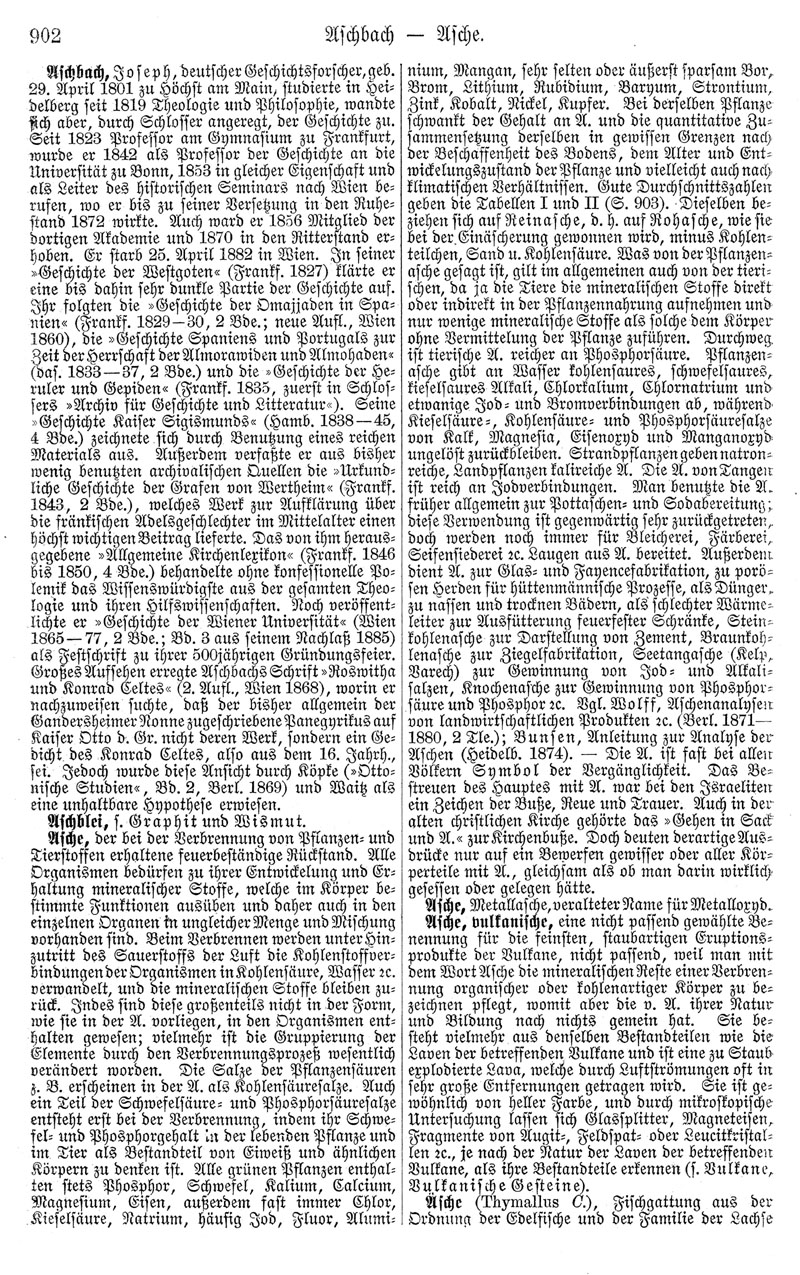
Thumb

Joseph Ritter von Aschbach (29 April 1801 – 25 April 1882) was a German historian who studied the Visigoths, writing "Geschichte der Westgoten" ("History of the Visigoths") in 1827.

Aschbach was born in Höchst (Frankfurt am Main). He initially studied theology and philosophy at the University of Heidelberg, but his focus soon turned to history, being influenced by Friedrich Christoph Schlosser. Since 1823 he was professor at the gymnasium of Frankfurt.

He became a professor of history at the University of Bonn in 1842, and later filled the same position at the University of Vienna (1853). Within two years he became a member of the Vienna Academy of Sciences. He was ennobled in 1870.

Aschbach died in Vienna.

== Written works ==
- Geschichte der Westgoten (History of the Visigoths), 1827.
- Geschichte der Omajjaden in Spanien (History of the Umayyads in Spain), two volumes, 1829-1830.
- Geschichte Spaniens und Portugals zur Zeit der Herrschaft der Almorawiden und Almohaden (History of Spain and Portugal during the reign of Almoravides and Almohades), two volumes, 1833–1837.
- Geschichte der Heruler und Gepiden (History of Heruli and Gepidi), 1835.
- Geschichte Kaiser Sigismunds (History of Emperor Sigismund), four volumes, 1838–1845.
- Urkundliche Geschichte der Grafen von Wertheim (Documentary history of the counts of Wertheim), two volumes, 1843.
- Allgemeine Kirchenlexikon (General church dictionary) editor, four volumes, 1846–1850.
- Geschichte der Wiener Universität, (History of the University of Vienna), three volumes, 1865/1877/postum 1885.
- Roswitha und Konrad Celtes (Hrotsvitha and Konrad Celtes), second edition in 1868.
