= Zeilsheim =

- Quarter of Frankfurt am Main
- Coat of arms

- Location of Zeilsheim (red) and the Ortsbezirk West (light red) within Frankfurt am Main
- Interactive map of Zeilsheim
- Location within Germany Location within Hesse
- Coordinates: 50°05′49″N 08°29′33″E
- Country: Germany
- State: Hesse
- Admin. region: Darmstadt
- District: Urban district
- City: Frankfurt am Main

Area
  - Total: 4.300 km^{2} (1.660 sq mi)

Population (2020-12-31)
  - Total: 12,515
  - Density: 2,910/km^{2} (7,538/sq mi)
- Time zone: UTC+01:00 (CET)
  - Summer (DST): UTC+02:00 (CEST)
- Postal codes: 65931
- Dialling codes: 069
- Vehicle registration: F
- Website: www.zeilsheim.de

Zeilsheim (German pronunciation: [ˈtsaɪlshaɪm]) is a quarter of Frankfurt am Main, Germany. It is part of the Ortsbezirk West and is subdivided into the Stadtbezirke Zeilsheim-Ost, Zeilsheim-Süd and Zeilsheim-Nord.

As the westernmost district of Frankfurt, Zeilsheim is somewhat rural in character and the surrounding fields can give a clear view of the Taunus mountains.

== Geography ==
Zeilsheim borders Kriftel in the west, Liederbach am Taunus in the north, the district of Unterliederbach in the northeast, Höchst in the east, and Sindlingen in the southeast. In the north and west, it is bordered by the Bundesautobahn 66 Wiesbaden-Frankfurt.

=== Infrastructure ===
The main street of the district is the Landesstraße 3018 that lead through the L 3016 from Kelkheim through Unterliederbach, through Zeilsheim until Hofheim am Taunus. It is sometimes nicknamed the Pfaffenwiese or the Hofheimer Straße (Hofheim Street). It is also a major street used in public transport. Zeilsheim is linked by bus to the observation tower in Bockenheim, to Griesheim and to Niederrad, as well as by regional bus lines to Schwalbach am Taunus und Hofheim.

==== Settlement ====
A settlement in Zeilsheim was initiated by Hoechst AG to provide worker housing located near its factories. A similar settlement is Heimchen in Unterliederbach. The main street of the settlement was called Neu-Zeilsheim. Nearly all of the intersecting streets are ordered alphabetically. Today in the center lies a church erected in 1912. On the western borders stands the building of the Käthe-Kollwitz School erected in 1902.

==== Taunusblick und Märchensiedlung ====
In the north and southeast of the district arose the settlements Taunusblick (Taunus view) and Märchensiedlung (Fairy tale settlement). The name of the northwestern settlement derives from the ability to see the Taunus mountains on a clear day. Märchensiedlung is located south of the main road. The name refers to façades of the houses that contain images from the stories of the Brothers Grimm.

== History ==
The district was first founded as the independent town Ciolfesheim in 794.

In 1917 it was incorporated into the city of Höchst. In 1928 it was incorporated along with Höchst into Frankfurt proper.

Zeilsheim became famous for its camp created by the Allies to hold Displaced Persons and exiles after World War II, and in 1946 it was visited by Zionist leader (later Israeli prime minister) David Ben-Gurion and former American First Lady Eleanor Roosevelt. A small monument in the park behind the city hall is dedicated to the memory of this community.

There is also a small museum with alternating exhibitions on the district's history.

== Sports ==
The SV Zeilsheim is playing in the Hessenliga, the fifth tier of German football.

== Administration ==
It is divided in into three districts itself, North, South and West (Nord, Süd und West).

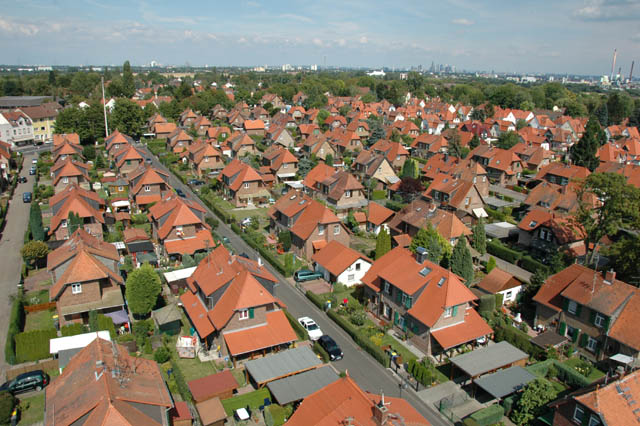
Zeilsheim

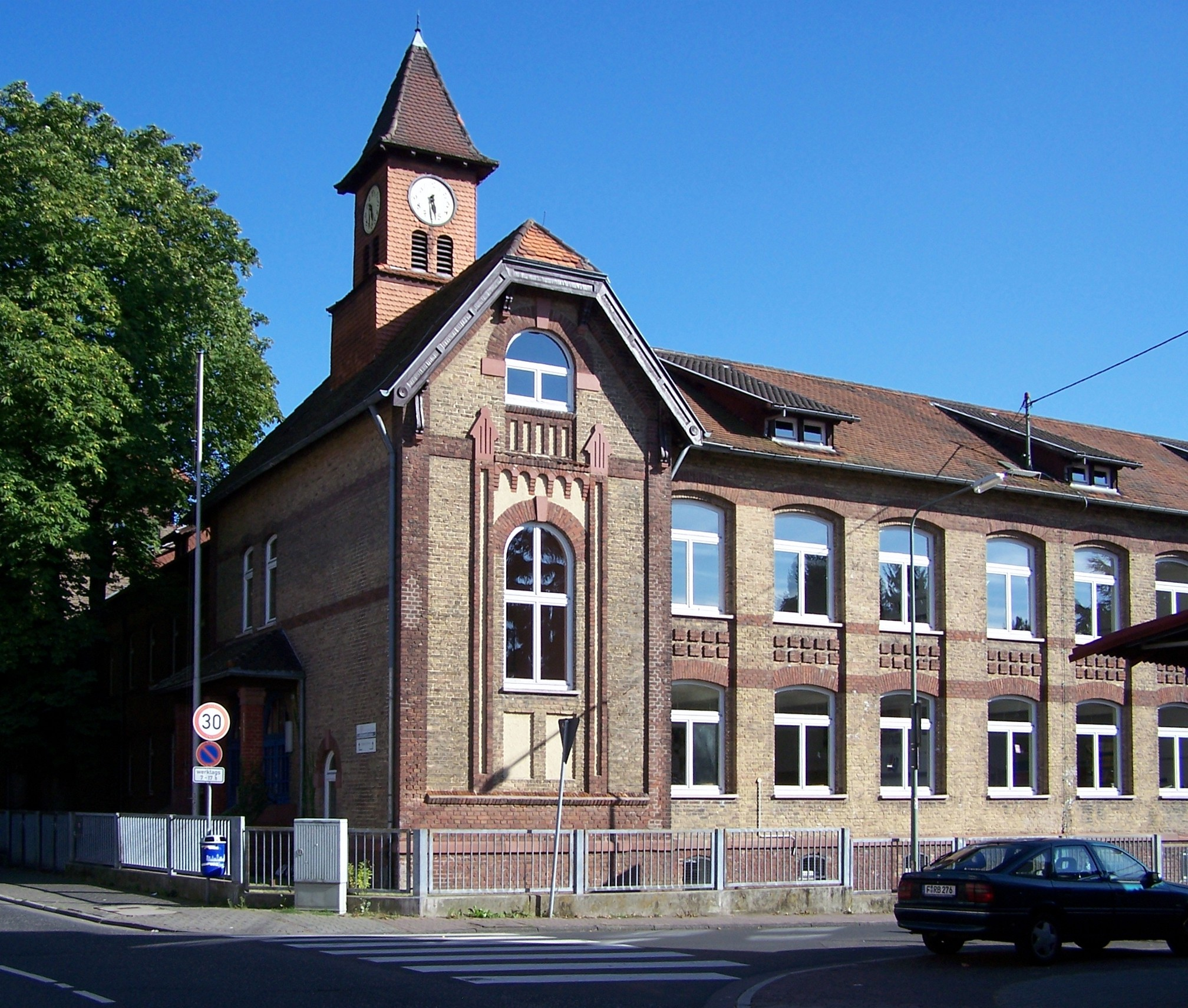
Käthe-Kollwitz-Schule

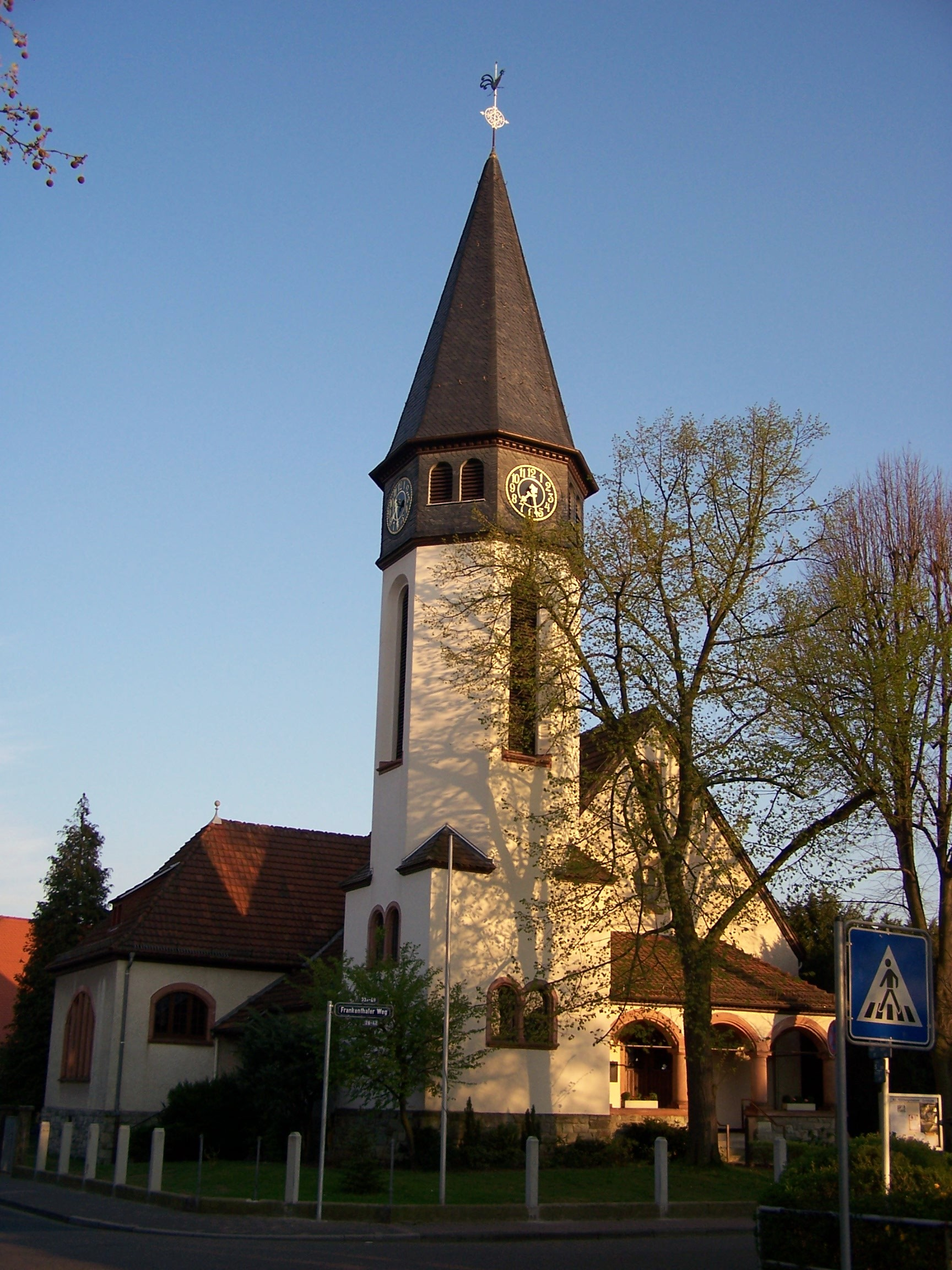
Protestant church

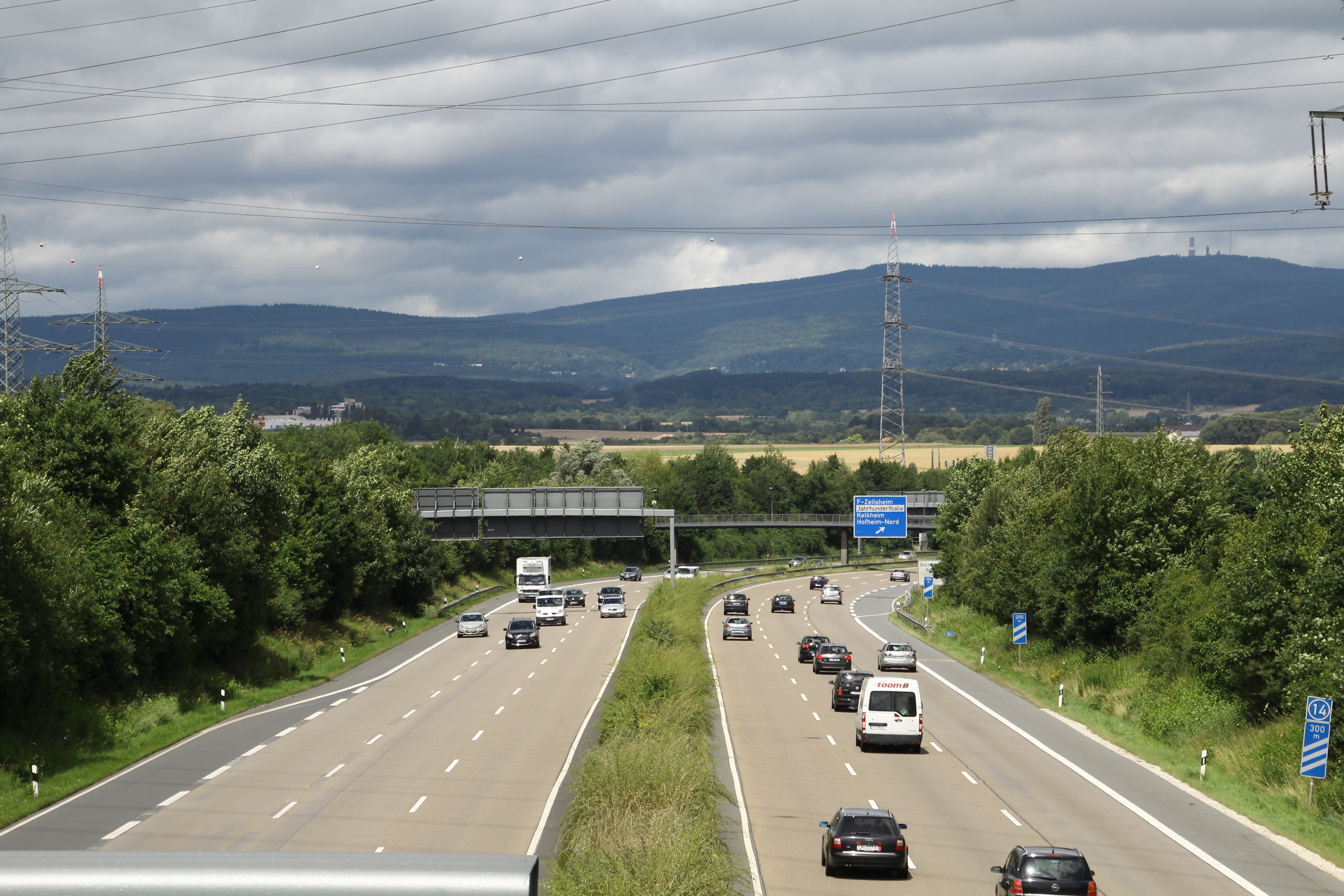
Autobahn exit Zeilsheim

== Transport links ==
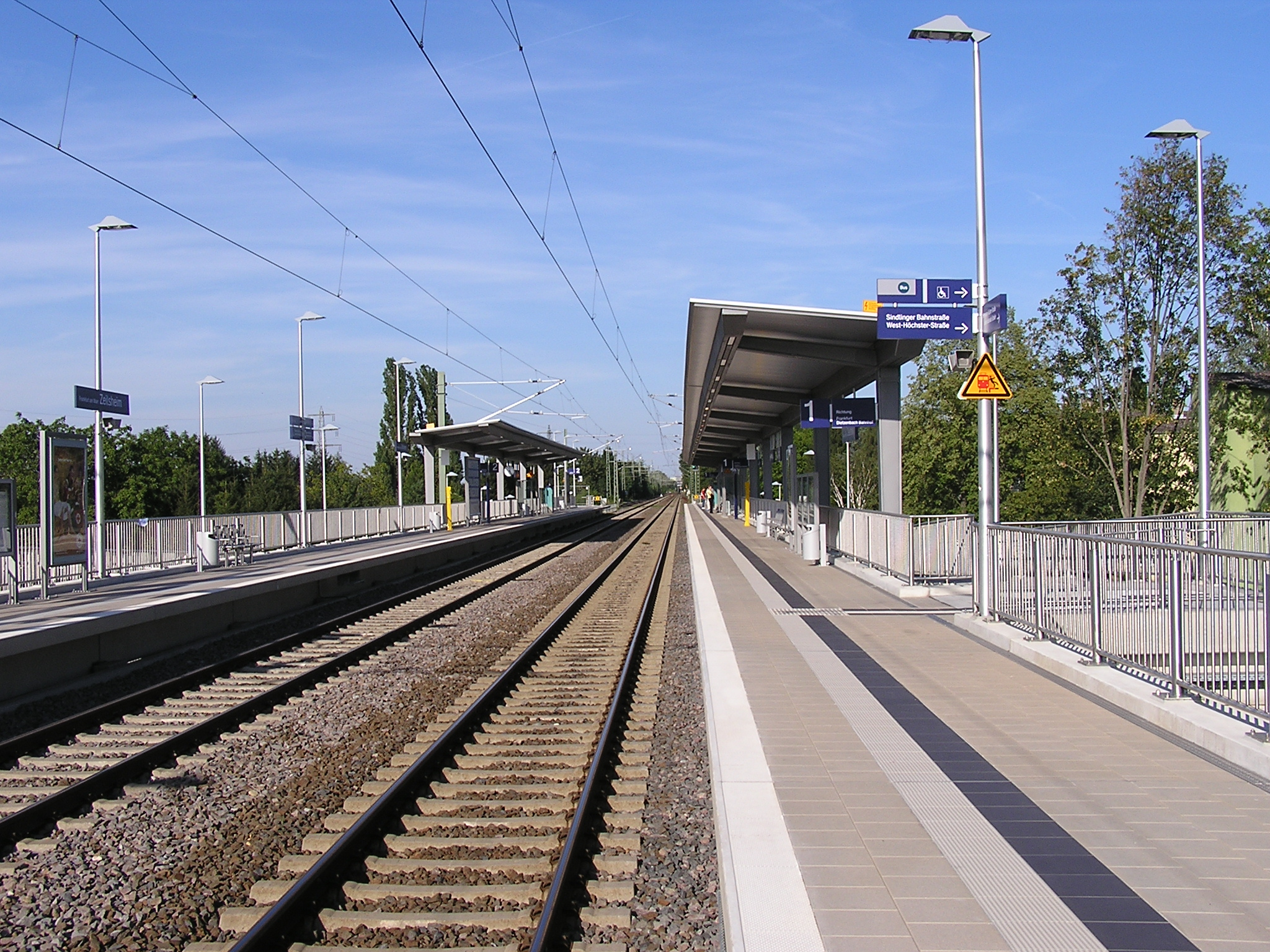
Frankfurt am Main Zeilsheim station

Zeilsheim itself is connected to the city bus network of the VGF, in the district Sindlingen, on the border to the Zeilsheim, in 2007 a new train station has been opened named "Frankfurt am Main Zeilsheim", by suburban train line S2, city busses and has a Park and Ride (P+R) and a Bike and Ride (B+R) faciality.
