= ISF International School Frankfurt Rhein-Main =

Coordinates: 50°05′12″N 8°30′15″E

- Frankfurt-Sindlingen, Hesse; Germany

Information
- Type: International private education
- Motto: Education for a changing world
- Established: 1995
- Faculty: 130
- Enrollment: 850
- Campus: 47,000 m²
- Website: www.isf.sabis.net

The ISF International School Frankfurt Rhein-Main is a private school in Sindlingen, a borough of Frankfurt am Main, Germany. Accredited by the Council of International Schools, the school offers IGCSE, International Baccalaureate Diploma Programme and AP examinations.

The International School of Frankfurt Rhein-Main was founded in 1995 as a public-private partnership in schools within Germany by the Frankfurt Chamber of Commerce, the State of Hesse, the Frankfurt Economic Development GmbH and with financial support of international companies in the region. The school opened in September 1995 with 65 students enrolled in Kindergarten throughout Grade 8. 10 years later it had an enrollment of around 900 students from 49 nations from preschool up through grade 12.

== Academic Program ==
ISF uses the SABIS Educational System since 1995. SABIS is a global school network that dates back to 1886 and currently educates over 70,000 students. The school offers external examinations such as the International Baccalaureate (IB), British-based IGCSEs, and the U.S.-based Advanced Placement program.

== Clubs and Activities ==
ISF offers a variety of clubs and activities for students. These activities include arts and crafts, dance, ballet, chess, choir, dance, debating, drama, film, IT, drumming, and science. In 2014 members of the Debating Society were selected for the German National Debate Team and competed in the world championships held in Thailand.

Students can also take part in charitable projects such as Habitat for Humanity and the Students' Philanthropic Foundation (SPF). The Students' Philanthropic Foundation was founded by ISF students in 2013 and is a student-led charity that acts on a global scale to improve educational and health outcomes of youths worldwide.

== Athletics ==
After-school sports are run by the Sportverein ISF Sindlingen e.V. (the ISF Sports Club) and include badminton, basketball, golf, gymnastics, soccer, swimming, tennis, track and field/cross country, and volleyball. ISF is also a member of the German International Schools Sports Tournament (GISST) league, which comprises 11 international schools in Germany.

== See also ==
- International Baccalaureate Organization
- SABIS
