= Unterliederbach =

- Quarter of Frankfurt am Main
- Coat of arms

- Location of Unterliederbach (red) and the Ortsbezirk West (light red) within Frankfurt am Main
- Interactive map of Unterliederbach
- Location within Germany Location within Hesse
- Coordinates: 50°06′39″N 08°31′53″E
- Country: Germany
- State: Hesse
- Admin. region: Darmstadt
- District: Urban district
- City: Frankfurt am Main

Area
  - Total: 5.877 km^{2} (2.269 sq mi)

Population (2020-12-31)
  - Total: 17,151
  - Density: 2,918/km^{2} (7,558/sq mi)
- Time zone: UTC+01:00 (CET)
  - Summer (DST): UTC+02:00 (CEST)
- Postal codes: 65929
- Dialling codes: 069
- Vehicle registration: F
- Website: www.unterliederbach.de

Unterliederbach (German pronunciation: [ʊntɐˈliːdɐbax], lit. 'Lower Liederbach', in contrast to "Upper Liederbach") is a quarter of Frankfurt am Main, Germany. It is part of the Ortsbezirk West and is subdivided into the Stadtbezirke Unterliederbach-Ost, Unterliederbach-Mitte and Unterliederbach-West.

== Transport links ==
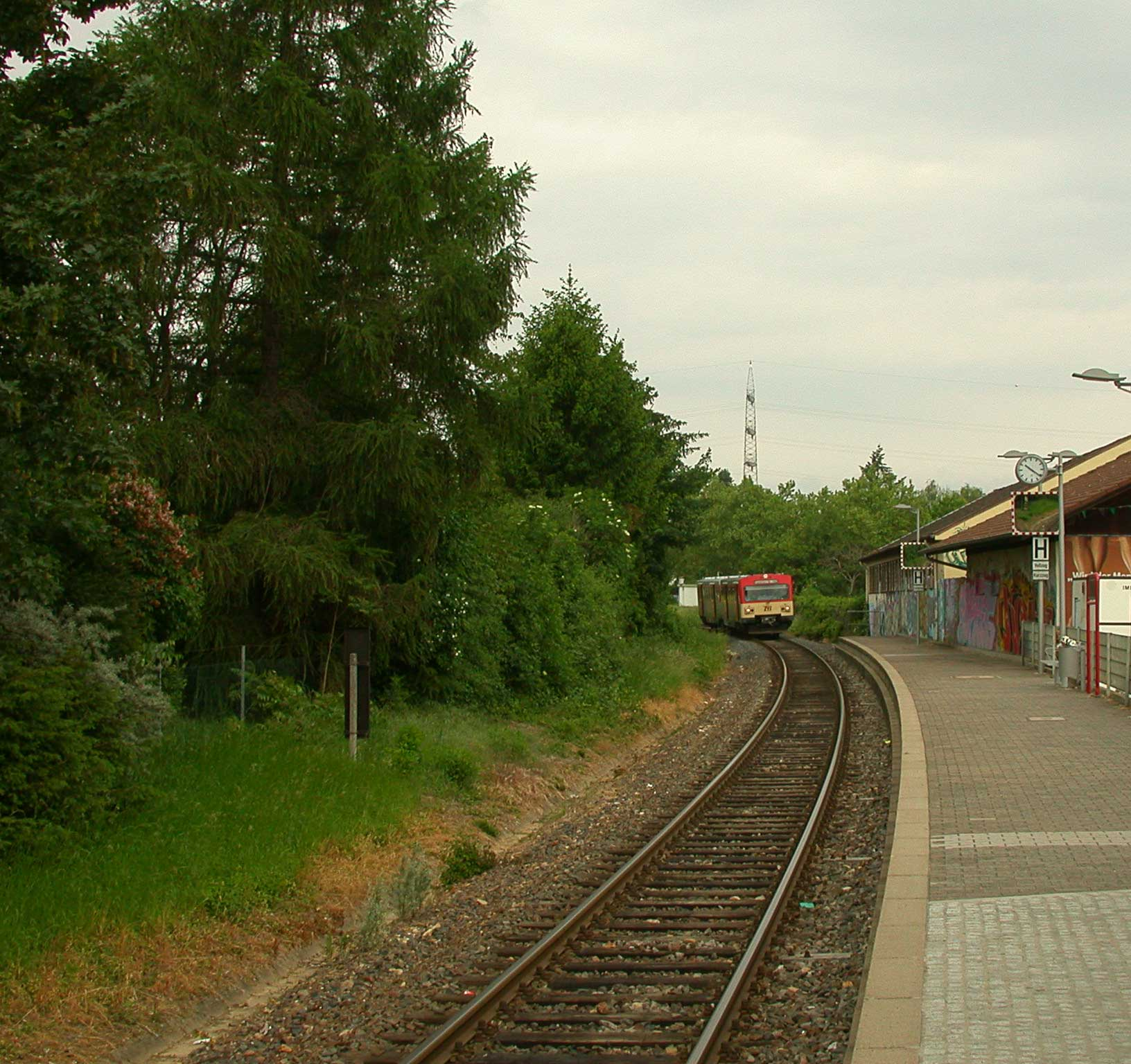
Unterliederbach stop

There is a train stop of the Königstein Railway from Frankfurt am Main Höchst station to Königstein station located in Unterliederbach.
