= Sindlingen =

- Quarter of Frankfurt am Main
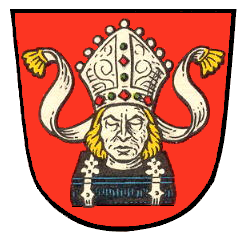
- Coat of arms

- Location of Sindlingen (red) and the Ortsbezirk West (light red) within Frankfurt am Main
- Interactive map of Sindlingen
- Location within Germany Location within Hesse
- Coordinates: 50°04′51″N 08°31′07″E
- Country: Germany
- State: Hesse
- Admin. region: Darmstadt
- District: Urban district
- City: Frankfurt am Main

Area
  - Total: 5.151 km^{2} (1.989 sq mi)

Population (2020-12-31)
  - Total: 9,095
  - Density: 1,766/km^{2} (4,573/sq mi)
- Time zone: UTC+01:00 (CET)
  - Summer (DST): UTC+02:00 (CEST)
- Postal codes: 65931
- Dialling codes: 069
- Vehicle registration: F
- Website: www.sindlingen.de

Sindlingen (German pronunciation: [ˈzɪntlɪŋən]) is a quarter of Frankfurt am Main, Germany. It is part of the Ortsbezirk West and is subdivided into the Stadtbezirke Sindlingen-Süd and Sindlingen-Nord.

== Transport links ==
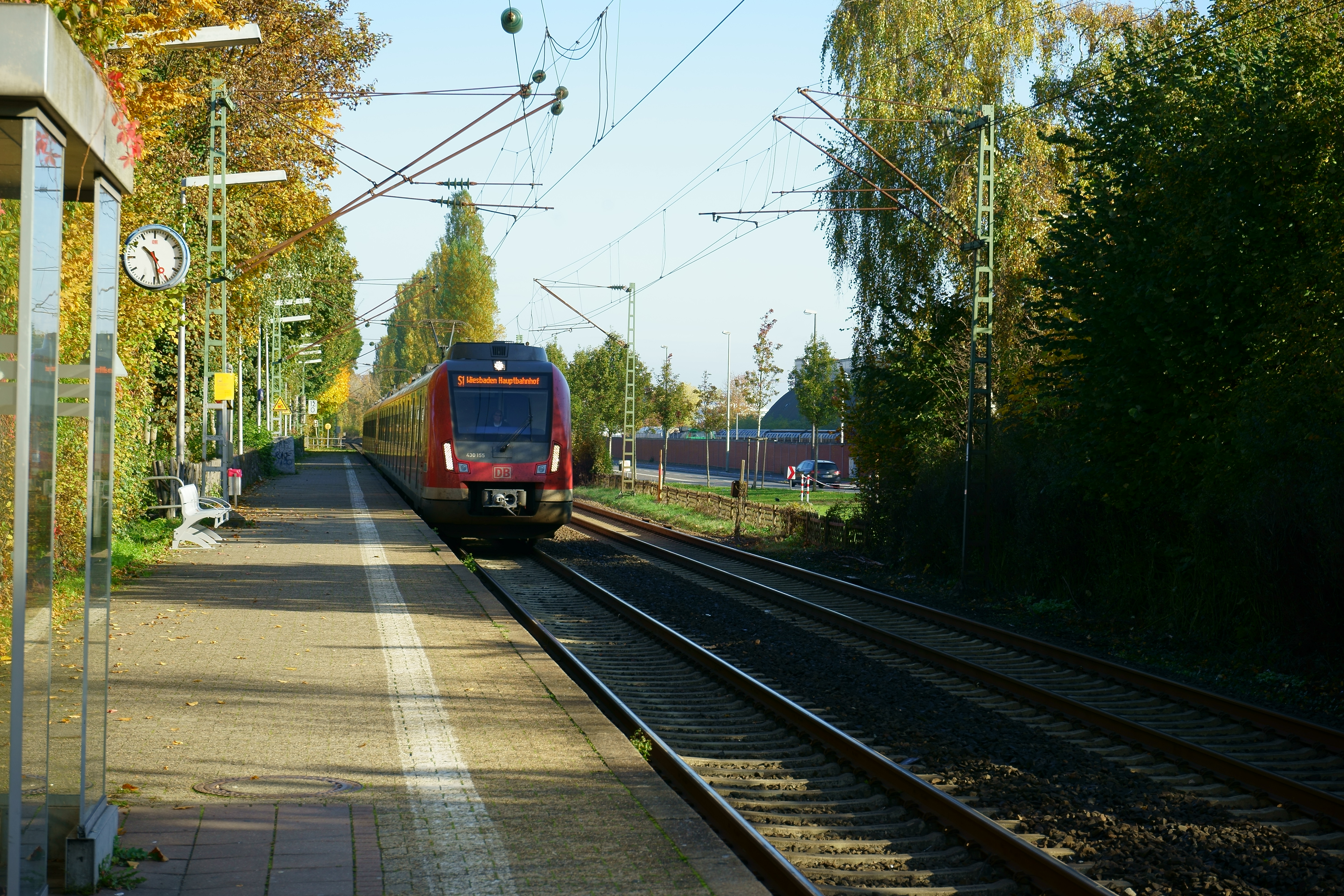
Frankfurt am Main Sindlingen station

Frankfurt Sindlingen station provides access to the Rhine-Main S-Bahn line S1.
