= Teak (disambiguation) =

Teak (Tectona grandis) is a species of large, deciduous tree.

Teak may also refer to:

- Teak furniture
- Teak Museum, in India
- Hardtack Teak, a nuclear weapon test
- USS Teak, a ship in the US Navy
- Iroko, African teak (Milicia excelsa)
- Tectona philippinensis, Philippine teak

== See also ==
- TEAC (disambiguation)
