= Paul Pietzschke =

German corporation

Paul Pietzschke Chem.-Techn. Fabrik
- Type: Public company
- Industry: Chemical
- Founded: 1889
- Headquarters: Norderstedt, Schleswig-Holstein, Germany
- Products: Adhesives; Launching Grease (lubricant); Sealants; Teak oils
- Website: www.pietzschke.de

Paul Pietzschke, or Paul Pietzschke NautiChem, is a German corporation that produces sealants, coatings and lubricants for shipbuilding. Its main office is in Norderstedt, North Germany. It was founded by Paul Pietzschke in 1889 in Hamburg, Germany, as a chemical and technology company.

== Products ==
From the beginning, the Paul Pietzschke Company has produced and marketed a line of elastic sealants, coatings and lubricants for the commercial shipbuilding industry. In 1962 it developed the WKT Synthetic Sealing Compound, the first fully synthetic sealant for the yacht and shipbuilding industry. The company's products are sold under the registered trademark NautiChem.

== History ==
Paul Pietzschke was founded by its namesake in 1889 in Hamburg, Germany. Its first trademark was registered in the German imperial patent office on February 24, 1898, under the name Paul Pietzschke. Its logo showed the letter “P” and a newt tied up in chains, with its mouth closed with a padlock, indicating that Pietzschke products protected from the harsh effects of rough sea water, even under the water line. In 1998 Mr. Paul Peter Pietzschke, from the third generation of the family-owned enterprise, transferred the company to Mr. Ralf Beckedorf. NautiChem was introduced as the company’s new trademark in 2001 and since then is used in the company’s current name, Paul Pietzschke NautiChem.

== Brands/products ==
- NautiChem
- WKT
- P-Bond
- Teak oils
- Adhesives
- Launching Grease (lubricant)

== See also ==
- List of German companies
