= Dimension stone =

Natural stone that has been finished to specific sizes and shapes

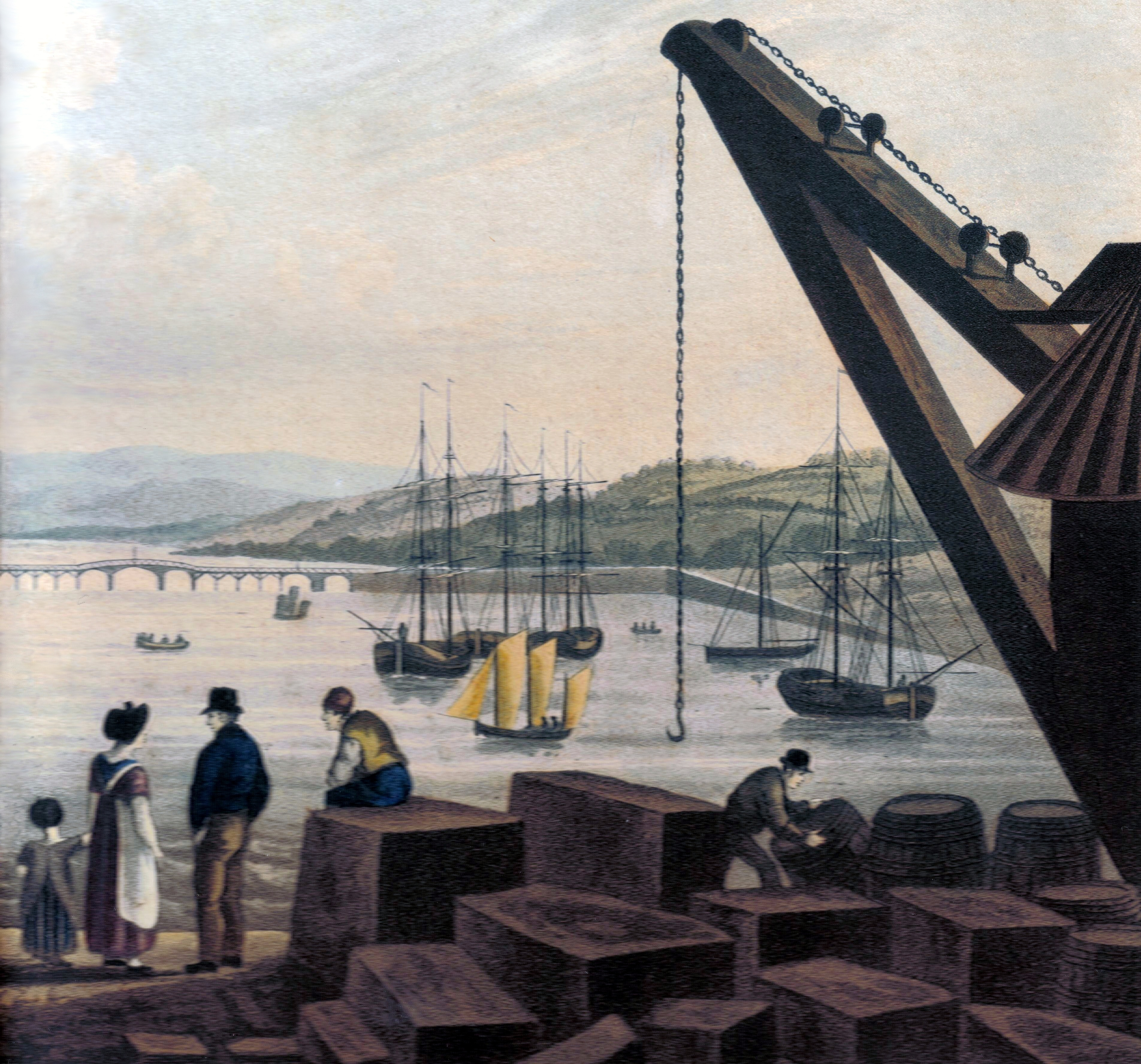
Large blocks of granite dimension stone being loaded at Teignmouth in Devon, southern England, in 1827

Dimension stone is natural stone or rock that has been selected and finished (e.g., trimmed, cut, drilled or ground) to specific sizes or shapes. Color, texture and pattern, and surface finish of the stone are also normal requirements. Another important selection criterion is durability: the time measure of the ability of dimension stone to endure and to maintain its essential and distinctive characteristics of strength, resistance to decay, and appearance.

Quarries that produce dimension stone or crushed stone (used as construction aggregate) are interconvertible. Since most quarries can produce either one, a crushed stone quarry can be converted to dimension stone production. However, first the stone shattered by heavy and indiscriminate blasting must be removed. Dimension stone is separated by more precise and delicate techniques, such as diamond wire saws, diamond belt saws, burners (jet-piercers), or light and selective blasting with detonating cord, a weak explosive.

== Stone and rock types ==
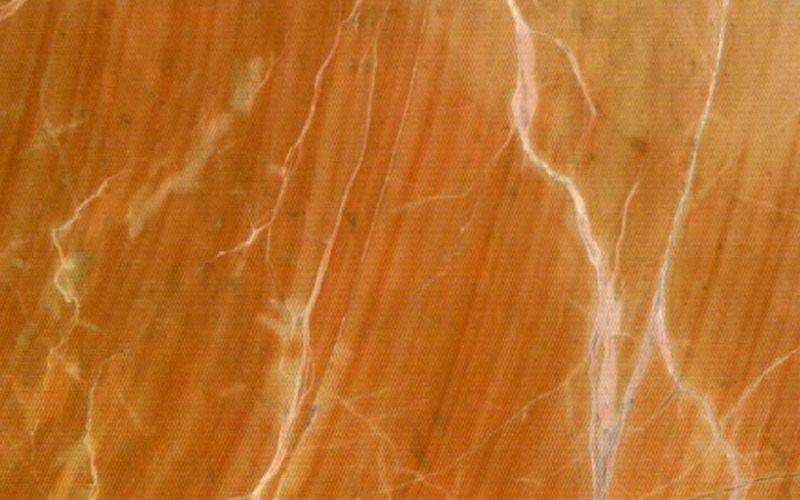
Surface of a marble slab from Sinj, Croatia

A variety of igneous, metamorphic, and sedimentary rocks are used as structural and decorative dimension stone. These rock types are more commonly known as granite, limestone, marble, travertine, quartz-based stone (sandstone, quartzite) and slate. Other varieties of dimension stone that are normally considered to be special minor types include alabaster (massive gypsum), soapstone (massive talc), serpentine and various products fashioned from natural stone.

A variety of finishes can be applied to dimension stone to achieve diverse architectural and aesthetic effects. These finishes include, but are not limited to, the following. A polished finish gives the surface a high luster and strong reflection of incident light (almost mirror-like). A honed finish provides a smooth, satin-like ("eggshell"), nonreflective surface. More textured finishes include brush-hammered, sandblasted, and thermal. A brush-hammered finish, similar to a houndstooth pattern, creates a rough, but uniformly patterned surface with impact tools varying in coarseness. A sandblasted surface provides an irregular pitted surface by impacting sand or metal particles at high velocity against a stone surface. A thermal (or flamed) finish produces a textured, nonreflective surface with only a few reflections from cleavage faces, by applying a high-temperature flame. This finish may change the natural color of the stone depending on mineralogical composition, particularly with stones containing higher levels of iron.

== Major applications ==
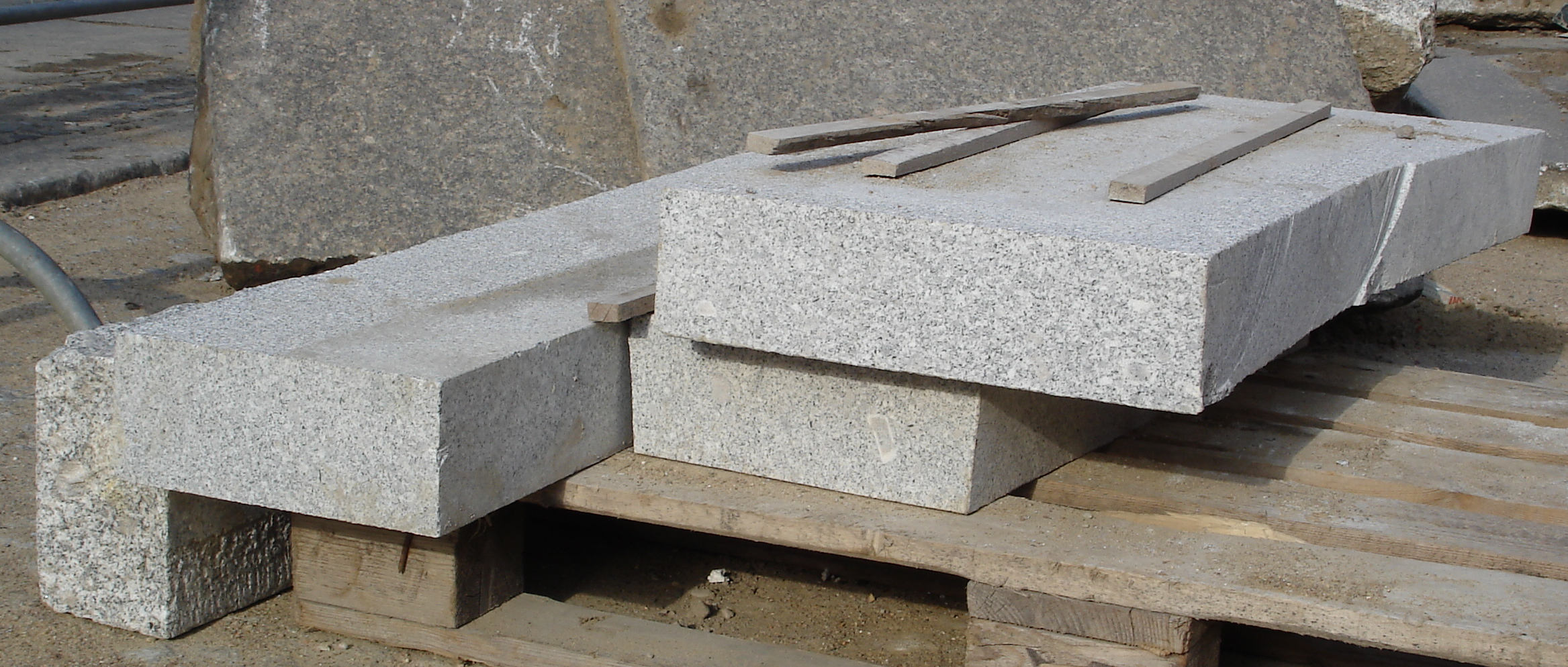
Rough-cut slabs of granite dimension stone

While common colors used in some of the major applications are listed below, there is an extraordinarily wide range of colours, available in thousands of patterns. These patterns are created by geological phenomena such as mineral grains, inclusions, veins, cavity fillings, blebs, and streaks. In addition, rocks and stones not normally classed as dimension stone are sometimes selected for these applications. These can include jade, agate, and jasper.

Stone (usually granite) countertops and bathroom vanities both involve a finished slab of stone, usually polished but sometimes with another finish (such as honed or sandblasted). Industry standard thicknesses in the United States are 3/4 and 1 1/4 inches (19 and 32 mm). Often 19 mm slabs will be laminated at the edge to create the appearance of a thicker edge profile. The slabs are cut to fit the top of the kitchen or bathroom cabinet, by measuring, templating or digital templating. Countertop slabs are commonly sawn from rough blocks of stone by reciprocating gangsaws using steel shot as abrasive. More modern technology utilizes diamond wire saws which use less water and energy. Multi-wire saws with as many as 60 wires can slab a block in less than two hours. The slabs are finished (i.e., polished, honed), then sealed with resin to fill micro-fissures and surface imperfections typically due to the loss of poorly bonded elements such as biotite. The fabricators' shop cuts these slabs down to final size and finishes the edges with equipment such as hand-held routers, grinders, CNC equipment, or polishers. In 2008, concerns were raised regarding radon emissions from granite countertops; the National Safety Council states that the contributions of radon to inside air come from the soil and rock around the residence (69%), the outdoor air and the water supply (28%), and only 2.5% from all building materials-including granite countertops. A concerned homeowner can employ ASTM radon mitigation and removal techniques. The stone for countertops or vanities is usually granite, but often is marble (especially for vanity tops), and is sometimes limestone or slate. The majority of the stone for this application is produced in Brazil, Italy, and China.

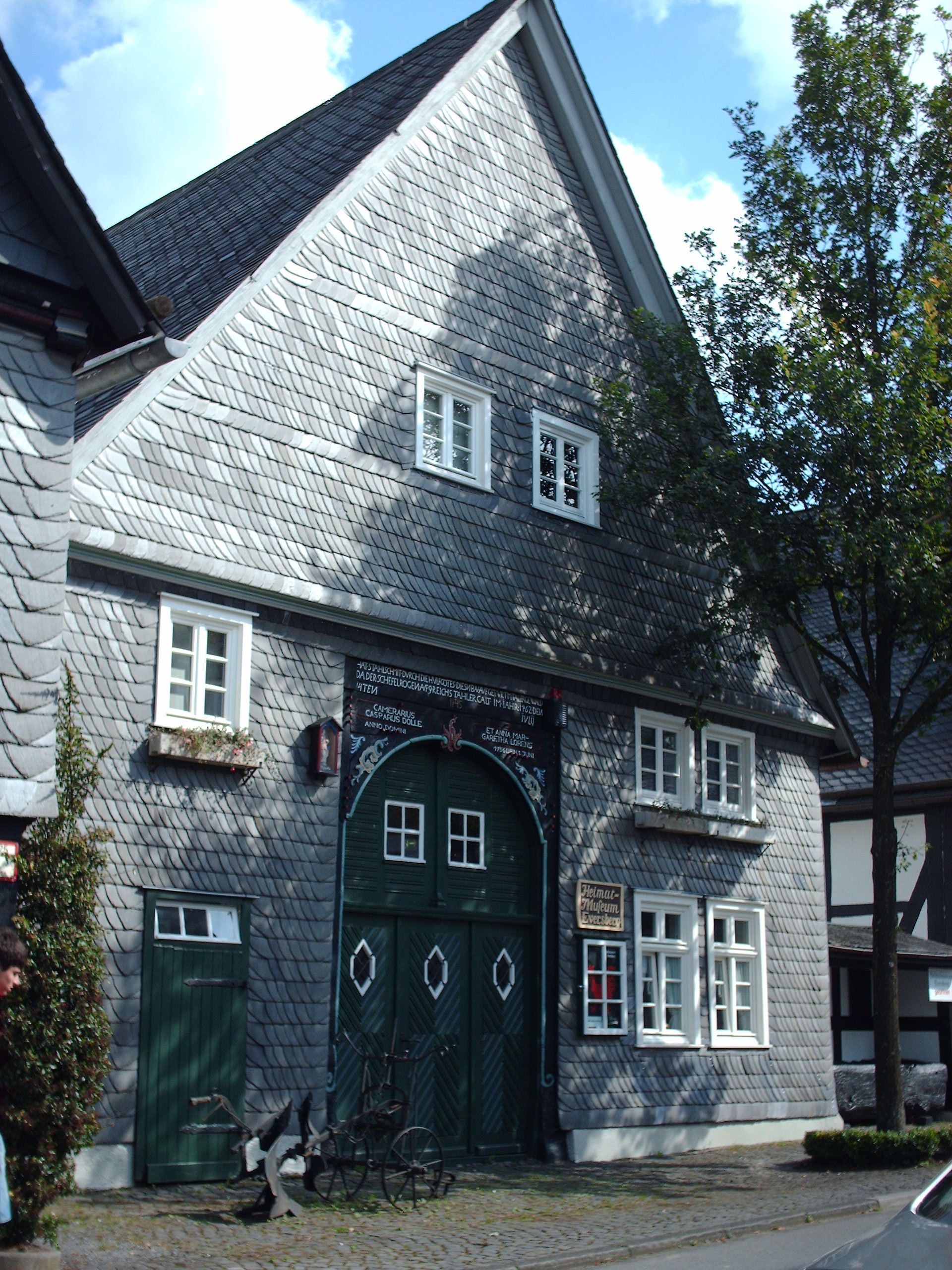
Slate tile covers this entire structure in Germany

Tile is a thin modular stone unit, commonly 12 inches (300 mm) square and 3/8 inch (9.5 mm) deep. Other popular sizes are 15 inches (380 mm) square, 18 inches (460 mm) square, and 24 inches (610 mm) square; these will usually be deeper than the 12-inch square. The majority of tile has a polished finish, but other finishes such as honed are becoming more common. Almost all stone tile is mass-produced by automated tile lines to identical size, finish, and close tolerances. Exceptions include slate flooring tile and special orders: tile with odd sizes or shapes, unusual finishes, or inlay work. In summary, the automated tile line is a complex of cutting and calibrating machines, honing-polishing machines, edging machines that put on flat or rounded edges, and interconnecting conveyors to move the stone from the slab input to the final tile product. The stone for tiles is most commonly marble, but often is granite, and sometimes limestone, slate, or quartz-based stone. Common colors are white and light earth colors. Much of the stone for this application is produced in Italy and China.

Stone monuments include tombstones, grave markers or as mausoleums. After being gangsawed into big deep (up to 10 ft [3.0 m] wide and over 6 in [150 mm] deep) slabs, smaller saws or guillotines (they break the granite and make the rough edges commonly seen on monuments) shape the monuments. The fronts and backs are usually polished. The individual monuments are then carved, shaped, and further defined by hand tools and sandblasting equipment. At this time, the stone for monuments is most commonly granite, sometimes marble (as in military cemeteries), and rarely others. Granite and quartz both demonstrate good durability, especially because rain is naturally acidic. (This is a natural consequence of the carbon dioxide present in the atmosphere, which generates a weak solution of carbonic acid in rainfall; further acidification of rainfall arises from oxides of sulphur and nitrogen due to anthropogenic emissions). (Limestone and sandstone were commonly chosen for monuments in the nineteenth century, but they are no widely longer used because of the rapid erosion rates due to dissolution of acid-vulnerable carbonates by acidic rainfall.) The most common monument colors for granite are gray, black, and mahogany; for marble, white is most popular. Today, the majority of the stone used in North America in this application is imported from countries such as India and China. This has depressed traditional North American monument centers such as Georgia and Quebec.

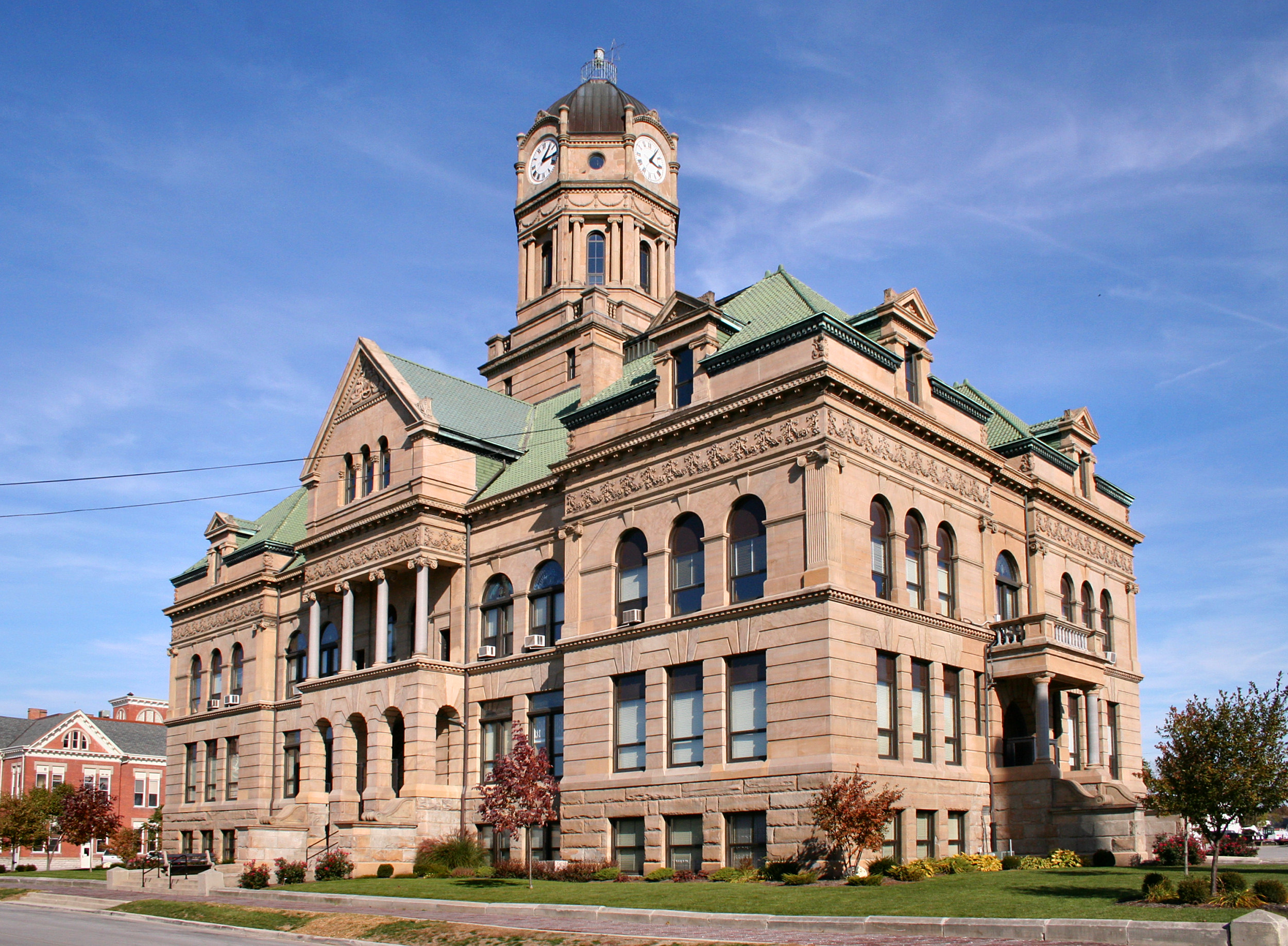
Dimension stone has been used in the construction of buildings for centuries. Due to costs, today stone veneers are usually used in place of solid stone blocks. This courthouse was built of dimension stone quarried in Berea, Ohio.

There are a number of smaller applications for buildings and traffic-related uses. Building components include stone used as veneer, a non load-bearing facing of stone attached to a backing of an ornamental nature, although it also protects and insulates; and ashlar, a squared block of stone, often brick-sized, for facing of walls (primarily exterior). Other shapes include rectangular blocks used for stair treads, sills, and coping (coping is sometimes nonrectangular). The shapes subject to foot traffic will usually have an abrasive finish such as honed or sandblasted. The stone is mostly limestone, but often is quartz-based stone (sandstone), or even marble or granite. Roofing slate is a thin-split shingle-sized piece of slate, and when in place forms the most permanent kind of roof; slate is also used as countertops and flooring tile. Traffic-related stone is that which is used for curbing (vehicular) and flagstone (pedestrian). Curbing is thin stone slabs used along streets or highways to maintain the integrity of sidewalks and borders. Flagstone is a shallow naturally irregular-edged slab of stone, sometimes sawed into a rectangular shape, used as paving (almost always pedestrian). For curbing, the stone is almost always granite, and for flagstone the stone is almost always quartz-based stone (sandstone or quartzite).

There are several other applications resembling flagstone in using rough dimension (or crushed) stone, usually as quarried, sometimes made smaller (i.e. by a jackhammer), often simply put in place: dry stone and riprap.

The stone used in these applications usually has to have certain properties, or meet a standard specification. The American Society for Testing and Materials (ASTM) has such specifications for granite, marble, limestone, quartz-based dimension stone (C616), slate (C629), travertine (C1527), and serpentine (C1526).

== Production ==
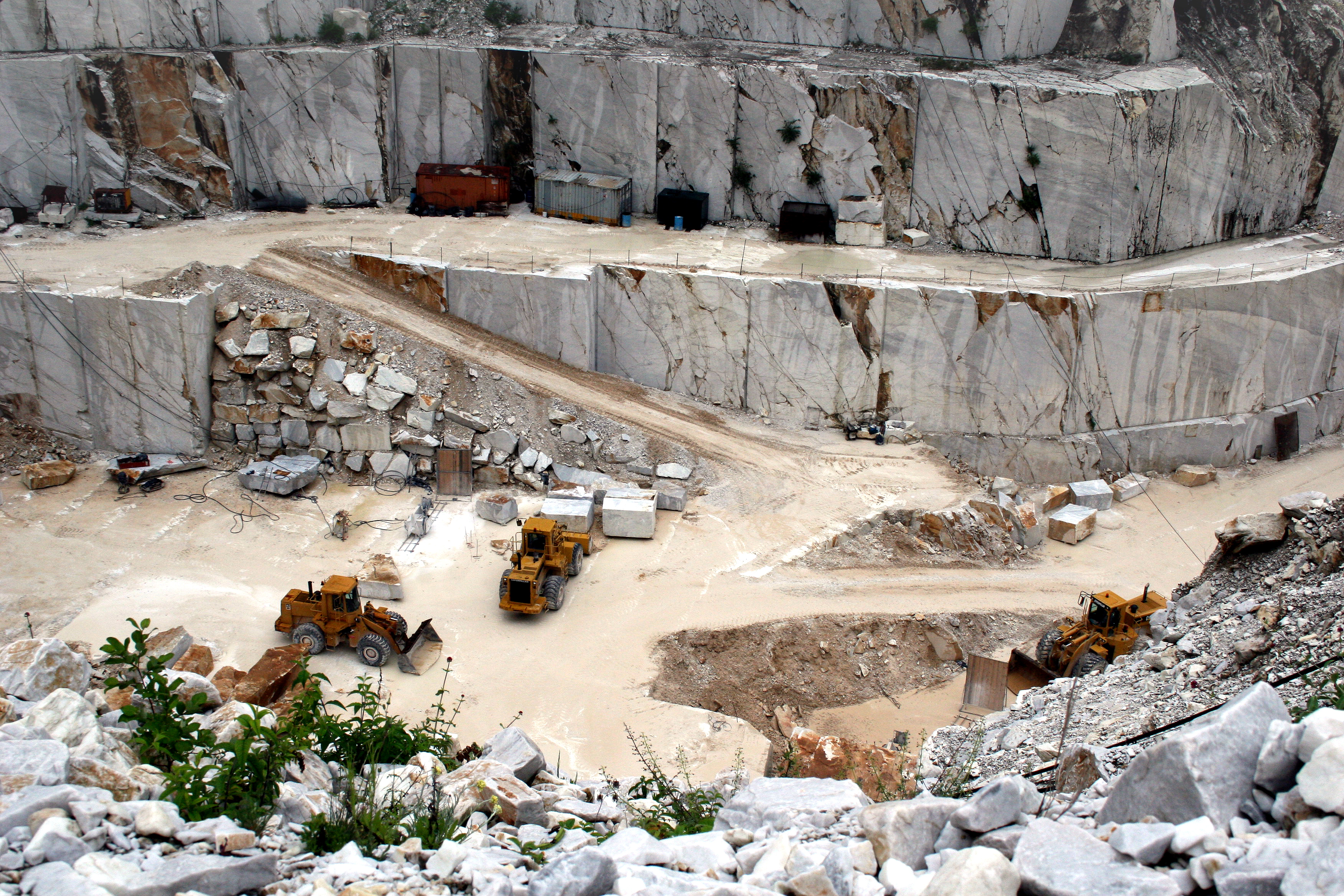
Marble quarry in Carrara, Italy

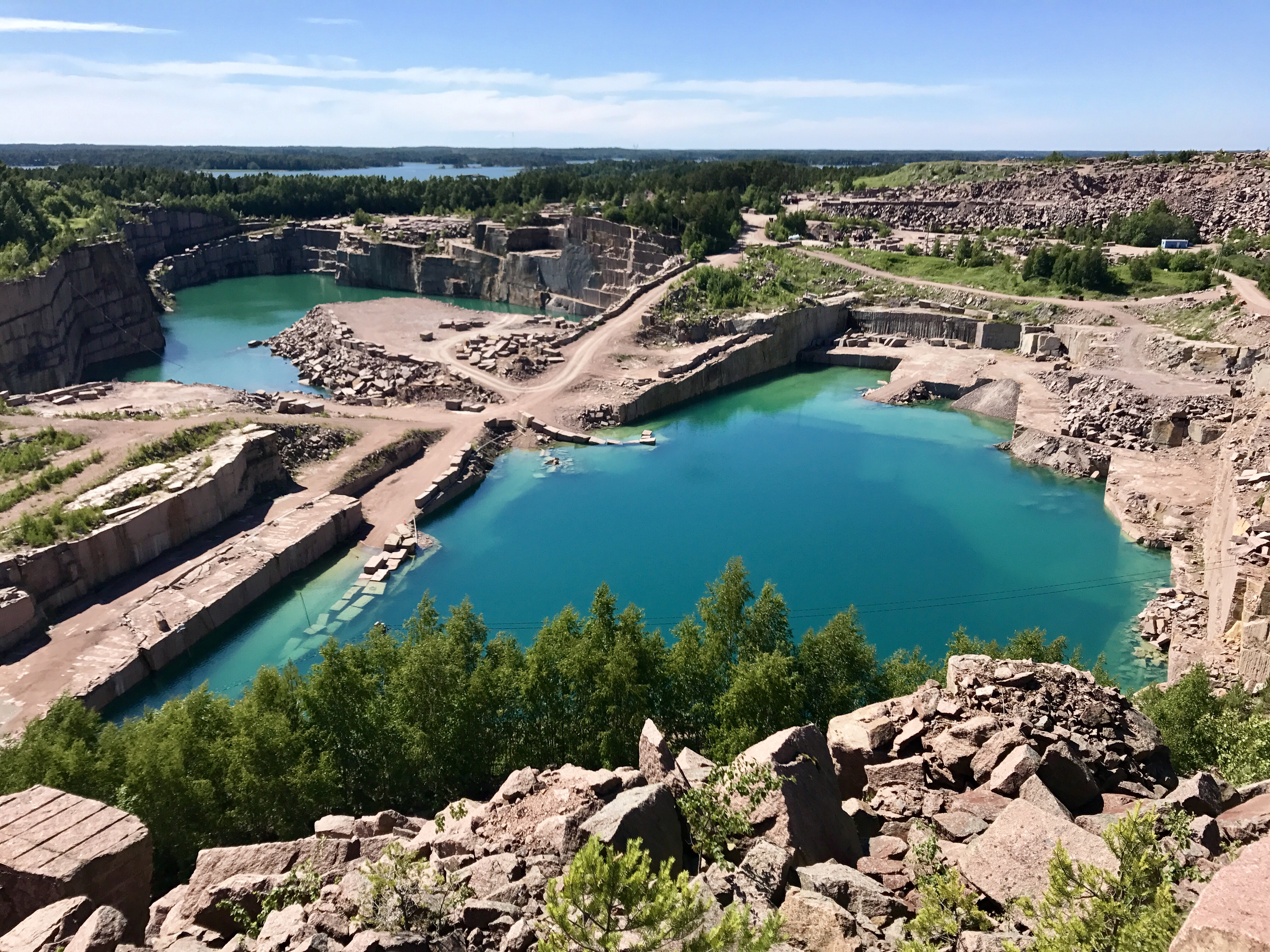
Granite quarry in Taivassalo, Finland

The major producers of dimension stone include Brazil, China, India, Italy, and Spain, and each have annual production levels of nine to over twenty-two million tons. Portugal produces 3 million tons of dimension stone each year.

According to the USGS, 2007 U.S. dimension stone production was 1.39 million tons valued at $275 million, compared to 1.33 million tons (revised) valued at $265 million in 2006. Of these, granite production was 453,000 tons valued at $106 million in 2007 and 428,000 tons valued at $105 million in 2006, and limestone was 493,000 tons valued at $93.3 million in 2007 and 559,000 tons valued at $96.1 million in 2006. The United States is at best a mid-level dimension stone producer on the world scene; Portugal produces twice as much dimension stone annually.

World comparison for dimension stone demand: The DSAN World Demand Index for (finished) Granite was 227 in 2006, 247 in 2007, and 249 in 2008, and the World Demand Index for (finished) Marble was 200 in 2006, 248 in 2007, and 272 in 2008. The DSAN World Demand for (finished) Granite Index showed a growth of 12% annually for the 2000-2008 period, compared to 14% annually for the 2000–2007 period, and compared to 15% annually for the 2000-2006 period. The DSAN World Demand for (finished) Marble Index showed a growth of 13.5% annually for the 2000–2008 period, compared to 14.0% annually for the 2000-2007 period, and compared to 12.5% annually for the 2000–2006 period. The indexes show world demand for granite has clearly been weakening since 2006, while the world demand for marble only weakened from 2007 to 2008. Other DSAN indexes for 2008 indicate that the 2000–2008 growth was down from the 2000–2007 growth.

The DSAN U.S. Ceramic Tile Demand Index shows a drop of 4.8% annually for the 2000–2007 period, compared to growth of 5.0% annually for the 2000–2006 period. The "traditional" major ceramic tile suppliers, Italy and Spain, have been losing markets to new entrants Brazil and China. The same thing has been happening with dimension stone with increasing supplies from Brazil, China and India.

In 2008, Chinese exports of granite countertops and marble tile increased from 2007, while those of Italy and Spain did not (see above, world demand).

== "Building green" with dimension stone ==
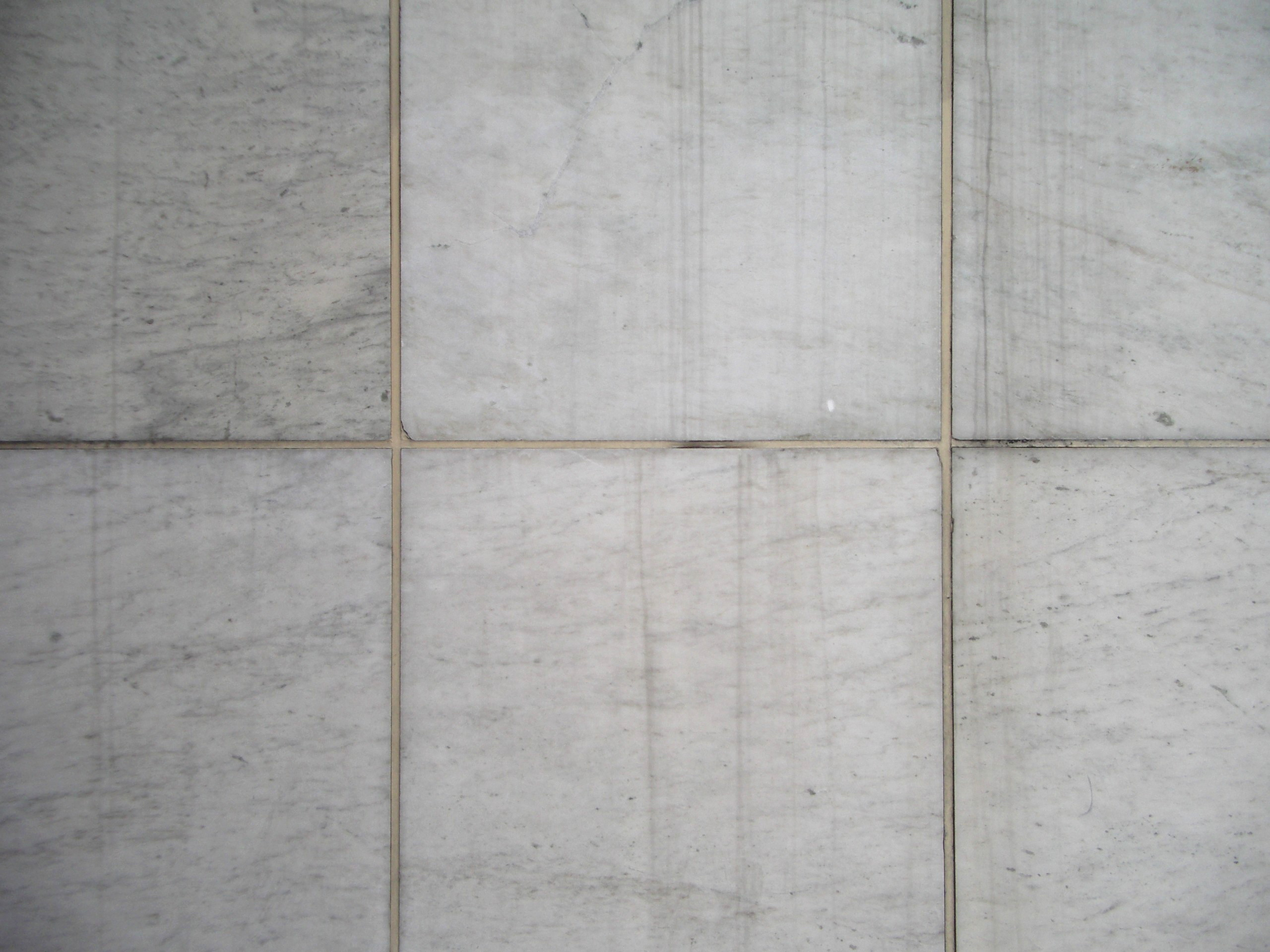
Marble cladding on a building

The concept of environmentally friendly construction with natural materials, known as green building, has had advocates since before the early 1990s. Energy price increases and the need for energy conservation when heating or cooling buildings since the 1980s have meant that associated design questions are pertinent to the architectural, construction, and civil engineering industries. This resulted in the formation in 1993 of the U.S. Green Building Council (USGBC), which has developed the building rating system, Leadership in Energy and Environmental Design (LEED). Educational institutions (colleges, universities, grade, and high schools) are often requiring new buildings to be green, and some jurisdictions have some rules promoting green building. When building with these goals in mind, dimension stone has an advantage over steel, concrete, glazed glass and laminated plastics, whose productions are all energy intensive and create significant air and water pollution. As an entirely natural product, dimension stone also has an advantage over synthetic/artificial stone products, as well as composite and space-age materials. One LEED requirement provides that the dimension stone used in a green building be quarried within a 500-mile (800 km) radius of the building being constructed. This gives a clear advantage to domestic dimension stone.

When demolishing a structure, dimension stone is 100% reusable and can be salvaged for new construction, used as paving or crushed for use as aggregates. There are also stone cleaning methods with less environmental impact, either in development or already in use, such as removing the black gypsum crusts that form on marble and limestone by applying sulfate-reducing bacteria to the crust to gasify it, breaking up the crust for easy removal. See DSAN for updates on "building green" and dimension stone recycling.

The Natural Stone Council has a library of information on building green with dimension stone, including life-cycle inventory data for each major dimension stone, giving the amount of energy, water, other inputs, and processing emissions, plus some best practice studies. In addition, it has shown ways that dimension stone can contribute LEED points, such as using a light-colored dimension stone to reduce heat-island effects, using dimension stone's thermal mass to impact indoor ambient air temperature thereby increasing energy efficiency, and especially by reusing dimension stone rather sending it to the landfill.

== Sustainability ==
Dimension stone is one of the most sustainable of the industrial minerals since it is created by separating it from the natural bedrock underlying all land on every continent. Dimension stone rates very well in terms of the criteria on the ASTM checklist for sustainability of building products: there are no toxic materials used in its processing, there are no direct greenhouse gas emissions during processing, the dust created is controlled, the water used is almost completely recycled (per OSHA/MSHA regulation), and it is a perpetual resource (virtually inexhaustible in a human time scale). Dimension stone in use can last many generations, even centuries, so the dimension stone manufacturers have not needed a product recycling program. However, there are practical qualifications to and constraints on that sustainability. The dimension stone color and pattern can be changed by weathering when it is very near the surface. The color and pattern can also be changed by proximity to an igneous rock body or by the presence of circulating groundwater charged with carbon dioxide (i.e., limestone, travertine, marble). On the other hand, changes in color and/or pattern can be positive. For example, there are at least 14 separately trade-named varieties of Carrara Marble with many patterns (or no patterns) ranging in shade from white to gray. The presence of faults or closely spaced joints can render the stone unusable. These faults and joints do not have to be at odd angles in the stone mass. Closely spaced, wrongly spaced, or nonparallel bedding planes can make the stone unusable, particularly if the bedding planes are planes of weakness. If part of the stone in one area is unusable, there will be another usable part of the stone elsewhere in the formation. A quarry is not a short-term project unless it encounters one of these constraints. Examples of big, old quarries operating for more than a century include the Barre (VT) granite quarry, the Georgia Marble quarry at Tate, several of the Carrara (Italy) marble quarries, and the Penrhyn (Wales) slate quarry. A quarry will produce dust, noise, and some water pollution, but these can be remedied without too much trouble. The landscape may also have to be restored if quarry waste is temporarily or permanently placed on adjacent land.

== Recycling and reuse ==
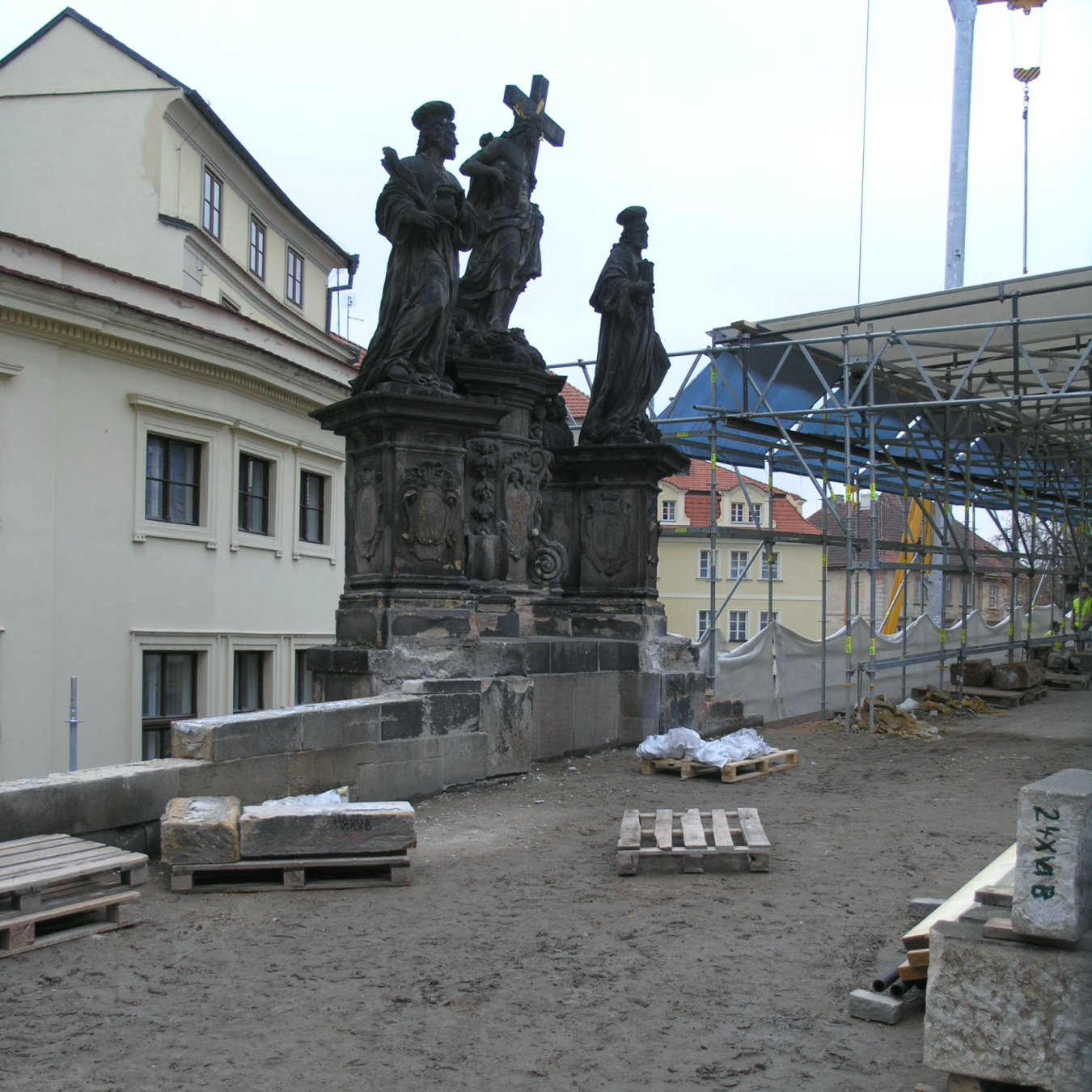
Reconstruction of the Charles Bridge in Prague showing numbered dimension blocks

Recycling dimension stone can occur when structures are demolished, along with recycling timber and recycling construction aggregate in the form of concrete. The material most likely to be recycled is concrete, and this represents the largest volume of recycled construction material. Not too many structures incorporate dimension stone, and even fewer of them have dimension stone worth saving. Stone recycling is usually done by specialists that monitor local demolition activity, looking for stone-containing houses, buildings, bridge abutments, and other dimension stone structures scheduled for demolition. Particularly treasured are old hand-carved stone pieces with the chisel marks still on them, local stones no longer quarried or that are quarried in a different shade of color or appearance. There is no national or regional trade in reclaimed stone, so a large storage yard is required, since the recovered stone may not be quickly sold and reused. The recycled dimension stone is used in old stone buildings being renovated (to replace deteriorated stone pieces), in fireplace mantels, benches, veneer, or for landscaping (like for retaining walls).

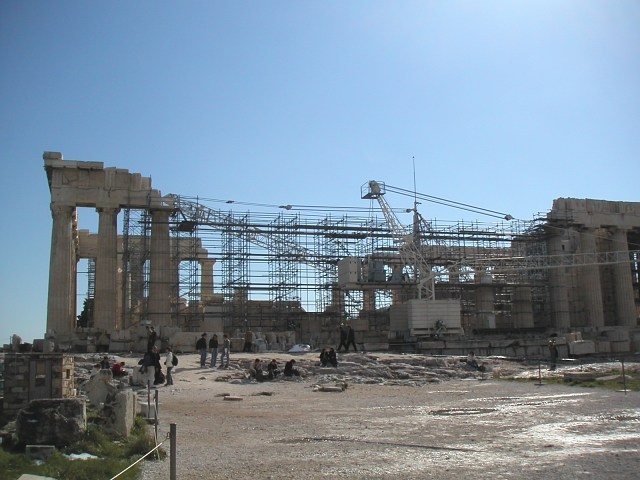
The Parthenon in Athens underwent a major reconstruction prior to the 2004 Olympics

Related to stone recycling and stone reuse is the deconstruction and reconstruction of a stone building. The building is taken apart stone block by stone block and the location and orientation of each block is carefully noted. Any roofing slate and interior stone in place is catalogued and moved in the same fashion. After the blocks, slate, and other stone used have been transported to the new location, they are put back in place where and how they were originally, thus reassembling the building. This is typically very expensive and rare but valuable in terms of historic preservation.

Dimension stone is also reused. Buildings immediately spring to mind, but such things as the ornate stone walls, arches, stairways and balustrades alongside a boulevard can also be renovated and reused. Sometimes the old interior of the building is kept as is, after repair. Sometimes the old building is gutted, leaving only a shell or facade and the space inside reconfigured and modernized. The stone work will usually need attention too.

The old stone work may only need cleaning or sandblasting, but it may need more. Firstly, the building exterior (facade) needs to be inspected for unsafe conditions. Next, the building walls need to be inspected for water leakages. The most likely needs are mortar restoration (repointing), applying consolidants to the old stone, or replacing pieces of stone that are deteriorated (damaged) beyond the point of any repair. The repointing is the removal of existing damaged mortar from the outer portion of the joint between stone units and its replacement by new mortar matching the appearance of the old. The consolidants re-establish the original natural bonding between the stone particles that weathering has removed. Deteriorated pieces of stone work are replaced with pieces of stone that match the original as much as possible. Exterior dimension stone will often change color after exposure to weather over time. For example, Indiana limestone will weather from a tan to an attractive light yellow. Interior dimension stone can sometimes change its shade a little over time too. For both, it may not be possible to find an exact match, even from the original quarry. Stone will often change its appearance from location to location in the same quarry. If the dimension stone renovationist is truly fortunate, the original builder put aside some spare pieces of the stone for future need.

== Life-cycle assessment and best practices ==
As in every economic sector, the construction industry's purchases of materials and services creates a whole chain of processes from raw material selecting in situ, removal from the earth, usually proceeding to cutting, finishing, or processing/manufacturing, then transport, and retailing. All of these activities have significant upstream (off-site) environmental impacts, whether in terms of energy and raw resource use or emissions to air, land, or water impacting living organisms or the Earth's surface (non-organic). Life cycle assessment is a method for estimating and comparing a range of environmental performance measures (e.g. global warming, acidification potential, toxicity, ozone depletion potentials) over the full life cycle of a product, a building assembly, or a whole building. As such, it provides a comprehensive means for evaluating and comparing products rather than prescriptive measures of individual product characteristics.

The ASTM has some relevant standards, particularly a guide on environmental life cycle assessment of building materials/products (E1991) that shows how to minimize the subjectivity that commonly mars and confuses environmental decision making. In particular, this guide describes the inventory analysis phase that requires data that is suitable for its intended purpose, thus covering data quality (such as completeness, reliability, accuracy, and credibility) as well as the allocation of the data (for multiple inputs and outputs), among other things. Results have to be on a common basis to allow a statistically significant comparison of alternative building product differences in the interpretation.

The Natural Stone Council (NSC) has commissioned some life-cycle inventory data for use in life cycle assessments. Almost 90% of the effort in doing a life cycle assessment involves getting reliable data. For example, the NSC has data that the global warming potential for granite quarrying is 100 kg of carbon dioxide equivalents and for granite processing is 500 (same units); and the global warming potential for limestone quarrying is 20 kg carbon dioxide equivalents while for limestone processing it is 80 (same units). The data on energy and water use include everything back to removal of overburden in the dimension stone quarry and upstream production of energy and fuels, and forward to packaging of finished dimension stone product or slabs for shipment and transport, or to moving scrap stone to storage or reclamation and to capturing and treatment of dust and waste water. The data is then placed in an impact category (i.e. changes to air, changes to water), characterized as to the contribution of the item to the impact compared to other items, and then the impact categories are assigned weights among themselves to show their relative importance.

The Natural Stone Council has also commissioned four best practices. One is on water consumption, treatment, and reuse while extracting and processing dimension stone, including dust mitigation, sludge management, and maximizing water recycling. Another is on site maintenance and quarry closure, including minimizing dust, noise, vibration and keeping the operation clean and tidy, both of which help in restoring the surface upon quarry closure. A third one is on solid waste management, including overburden, damaged stone unsaleable as product, sludge deposited from waste water, spent or spilled petroleum products, or metal scrap. The fourth one is on efficiently transporting stone to be finished as products, then transporting the products to consumers by centralizing freight management, consolidating small loads, choosing appropriate trucks, balancing and securing the load, and packaging with sustainable materials.

== Selection and cleaning ==
The selector of dimension stone begins by considering stone color and appearance, and how the stone will match its surroundings. In addition to many hundreds of different stones with different colors and patterns, each stone can change radically in color and appearance when a different finish is put on it. A polished finish accentuates the color and makes any pattern more vivid, and the rougher finishes (i.e. honed, thermal) lighten the color and make the patterns more subdued.

In addition to selecting a stone color and pattern, the suitability of its properties for the intended use must be considered. Stone being chosen for countertops or vanities should be non-absorptive, resist stains, and be heat and impact resistant. Stone being used in tiles should be sealed in order to resist staining by spilled liquids. Stone being used for flooring, paving, or surfaces subject to foot or vehicular traffic ought to have a semi-abrasive finish for slip resistance, such as bush-hammered or thermal. A glossy polished finish will be slick. Most flagstone surfaces are rough enough to be naturally slip-resistant.

Dimension stone requires some specialized methods for cleaning and maintenance. Abrasive cleaners should not be used on a polished stone finish because it will wear the polish off. Acidic cleaners can not be used on marble or limestone because it will remove (i.e. dissolve) the finish. Textured finishes (thermal, bush-hammered) can be treated with some mildly abrasive cleaners but not bleach or an acidic cleaner (if marble or limestone). Stains are another consideration; stains can be organic (food, grease, or oil) or metallic (iron, copper). Stains require some special removal techniques, such as the poultice method. A new method of cleaning stone on ancient buildings (medieval and renaissance) has been developed in Europe: sulfur-reducing bacteria are used on the black gypsum-containing crusts that form on such buildings to convert the sulfur to a gas that dissipates, thus destroying the crust while leaving the patina produced by aging on the underlying stone. This method is still in development and not yet commercially available.

== Finishes ==
The surface of a stone may be finished in a variety of ways. Below are some typical terms:

- Polished finish – a glossy surface which brings out the full color and character of the stone.
- Honed finish – a satin smooth surface finish with little or no gloss, frequently used for commercial floors.
- Brushed finish – a smooth, undulating finish achieved by applying stiff metal or plastic brushes on spinning heads.
- Thermal finish – a surface treatment applied by intense heat flaming.
- Diamond sawn – finish produced by sawing with a diamond toothed saw.
- Rough sawn – a surface finish resulting from the gang sawing (or frame saw) process.
- Bush-hammered – a mechanical process which produces a textured surface by hammering the stone surface with a textured metal or composite head. Texture varies from subtle to rough.

== See also ==
- List of decorative stones
- List of types of limestone – Limestone deposits listed by location
- List of types of marble
- List of sandstones
- Stone carving – Act of shaping stone materials
- Stones of India – Commercial stone industry
- Spolia, also known as repurposed building stone – Repurposed building stone for new construction

Categories:

- Building stone
- Stonemasonry

== Notes ==
=== References ===
- USGS 2007 Minerals Yearbook: Stone, Dimension
- Dimension Stone Advocate News (DSAN) Issue 31
- Dimension Stone Statistics and Information - United States Geological Survey minerals information for dimension stone
