= Roasting (metallurgy) =

Process of heating a sulfide ore

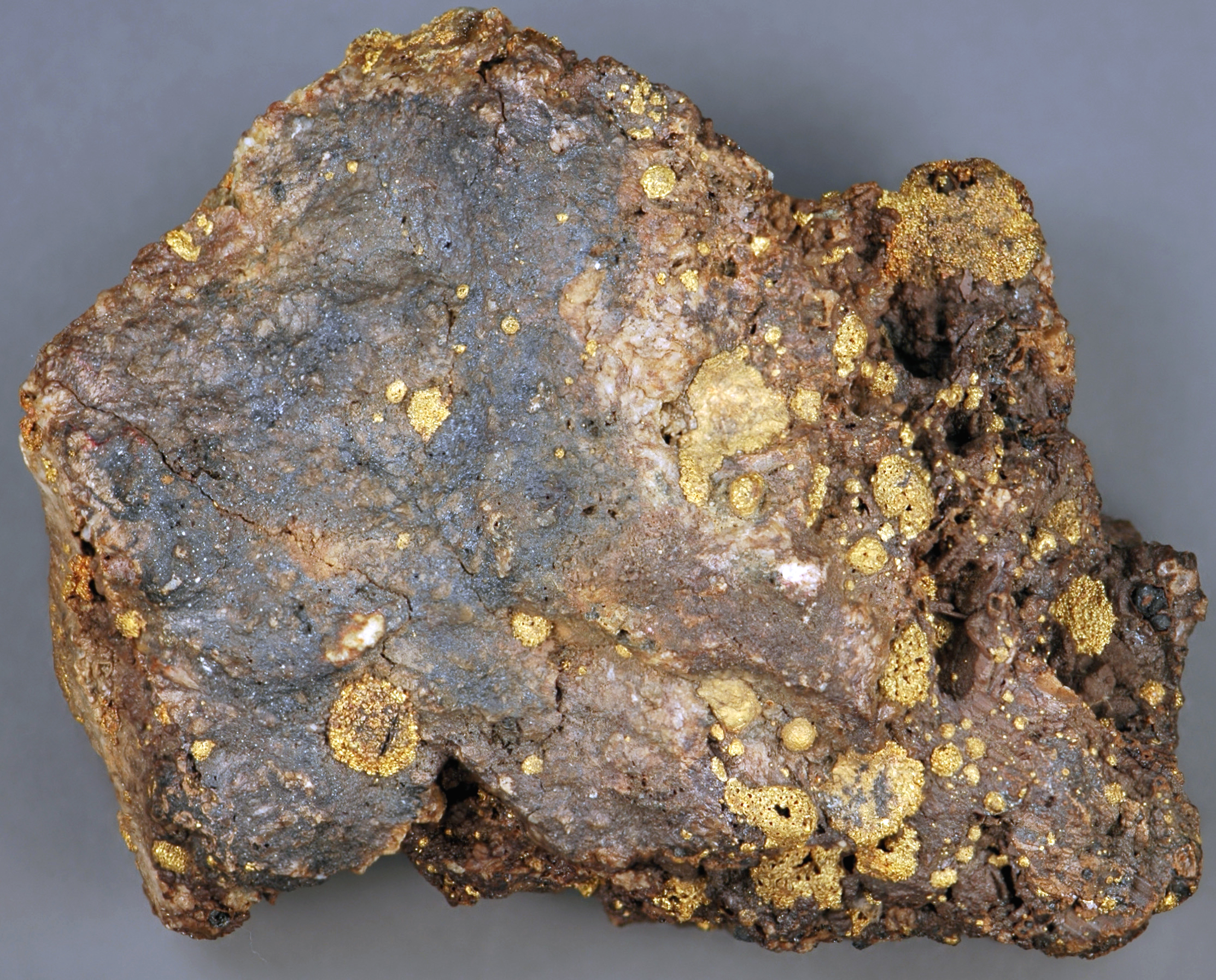
Roasted gold ore from Cripple Creek, Colorado. Roasting has driven off the tellurium from the original calaverite, leaving behind vesicular blebs of native gold.

Roasting is a process of heating an ore under flowing air. It is a step in the processing of certain ores. More specifically, roasting is often a metallurgical process involving gas–solid reactions at elevated temperatures with the goal of purifying the metal component(s). Often before roasting, the ore has already been concentrated, e.g. by froth flotation. The concentrate is mixed with other materials to facilitate the process. The technology is useful in making certain ores usable but it can also be a serious source of air pollution.

Roasting consists of thermal gas–solid reactions, which can include oxidation, reduction, chlorination, sulfation, and pyrohydrolysis. In roasting, the ore or ore concentrate is treated with very hot air. This process is generally applied to sulfide minerals. During roasting, the sulfide is converted to an oxide, and sulfur is released as sulfur dioxide, a gas. For the ores Cu_{2}S (chalcocite) and ZnS (sphalerite), balanced equations for the roasting are:

2 Cu_{2}S + 3 O_{2} → 2 Cu_{2}O + 2 SO_{2}
2 ZnS + 3 O_{2} → 2 ZnO + 2 SO

The gaseous product of sulfide roasting, sulfur dioxide (SO_{2}) is often used to produce sulfuric acid. Many sulfide minerals contain other components such as arsenic that are released into the environment.

Up until the early 20th century, roasting was started by burning wood on top of ore. This would raise the temperature of the ore to the point where its sulfur content would become its source of fuel, and the roasting process could continue without external fuel sources. Early sulfide roasting was practiced in this manner in "open hearth" roasters, which were manually stirred (a practice called "rabbling") using rake-like tools to expose unroasted ore to oxygen as the reaction proceeded.

This process released large amounts of acidic, metallic, and other toxic compounds. Results of this include areas that even after 60–80 years are still largely lifeless, often exactly corresponding to the area of the roast bed, some of which are hundreds of metres wide by kilometres long. Roasting is an exothermic process.

== Roasting operations ==
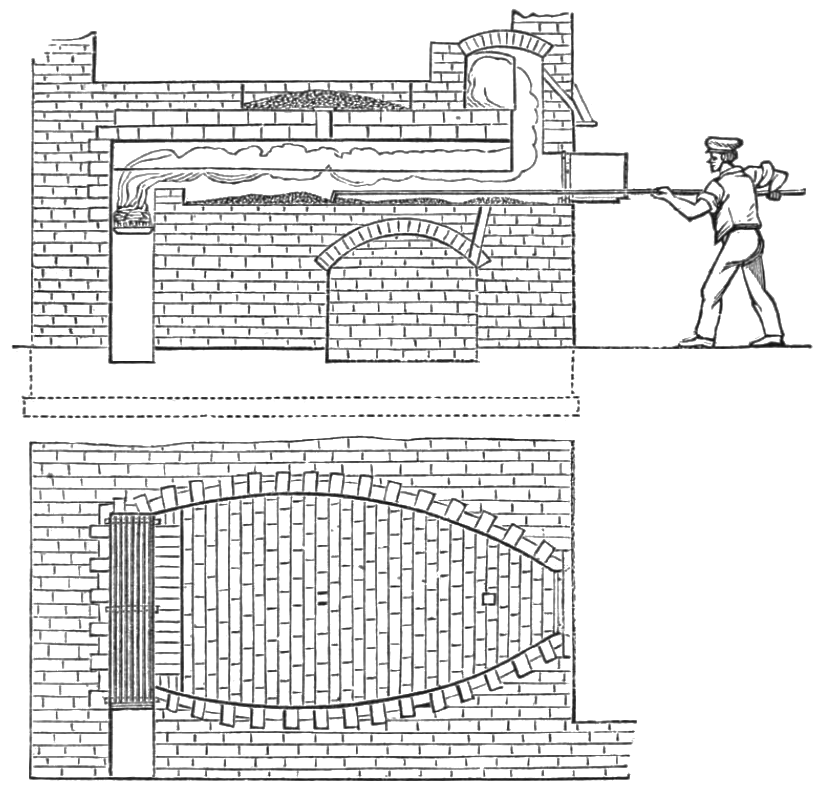
A reverberatory furnace for roasting tin ores

The following describe different forms of roasting:

=== Oxidative roasting ===
Oxidative or oxidizing roasting, the most commonly practiced roasting process, involves heating the ore in excess of air or oxygen.

For sulfide ores, roasting results in replacement of sulfide, partly or completely, by oxide. For molybdenum disulfide, the main ore of Mo, roasting proceeds as follows:

MoS_{2} + 3 O_{2} → MoO_{2} + 2 SO_{2}

Roasting the sulfide ore, until almost complete removal of the sulfur from the ore, results in a dead roast.

Galena (PbS), the most common mineral of lead, is oxidized to lead oxide and sulfur dioxide gas (PbO and SO_{2}).

Oxide ores are also roasted, but here an additive is often employed. In the case of chromite (FeCrO_{4}), the principal ore of chromium, roasting is conducted in the presence of sodium carbonate. The process gives a mixture of sodium chromate according to this idealized equation:

FeCrO_{4} + 1.5 O_{2} + Na_{2}CO_{3} → Na_{2}CrO_{4} + FeO + CO_{2}

Treating the roasted product with water yields a solution of sodium chromate, which is readily separated from various undesirable solids.

=== Volatilizing roasting ===
Volatilizing roasting, involves oxidation at elevated temperatures of the ores, to eliminate impurity elements in the form of their volatile oxides. Examples of such volatile oxides include As_{2}O_{3}, Sb_{2}O_{3}, ZnO and sulfur oxides. Careful control of the oxygen content in the roaster is necessary, as excessive oxidation can form non-volatile oxides.

=== Chloridizing roasting ===
Chloridizing roasting transforms certain metal compounds to chlorides through oxidation or reduction. Some metals such as uranium, titanium, beryllium and some rare earths are processed in their chloride form. Certain forms of chloridizing roasting may be represented by the overall reactions:

2 NaCl + MS + 2 O_{2} → Na_{2}SO_{4} + MCl,
4 NaCl + 2 MO + S_{2} + 3 O_{2} → 2 Na_{2}SO_{4} + 2 MCl_{2}

The first reaction represents the chlorination of a sulfide ore involving an exothermic reaction. The second reaction involving an oxide ore is facilitated by addition of elemental sulfur. Carbonate ores react in a similar manner as the oxide ore, after decomposing to their oxide form at high temperatures.

=== Sulfating roasting ===
Sulfating roasting oxidizes certain sulfide ores to sulfates in a supply of air to enable leaching of the sulfate for further processing.

=== Magnetic roasting ===
Magnetic roasting involves controlled roasting of the ore to convert it into a magnetic form, thus enabling easy separation and processing in subsequent steps. For example, controlled reduction of haematite (non-magnetic Fe_{2}O_{3}) to magnetite (magnetic Fe_{3}O_{4}).

=== Reduction roasting ===
Reduction roasting partially reduces an oxide ore before the actual smelting process.

=== Sinter roasting ===
Sinter roasting involves heating the fine ores at high temperatures, where simultaneous oxidation and agglomeration of the ores take place. For example, lead sulfide ores are subjected to sinter roasting in a continuous process after froth flotation to convert the fine ores to workable agglomerates for further smelting operations.

== See also ==
Smelting is a related metallurgical process but entails melting of some components.
