= Stones of India =

Commercial stone industry

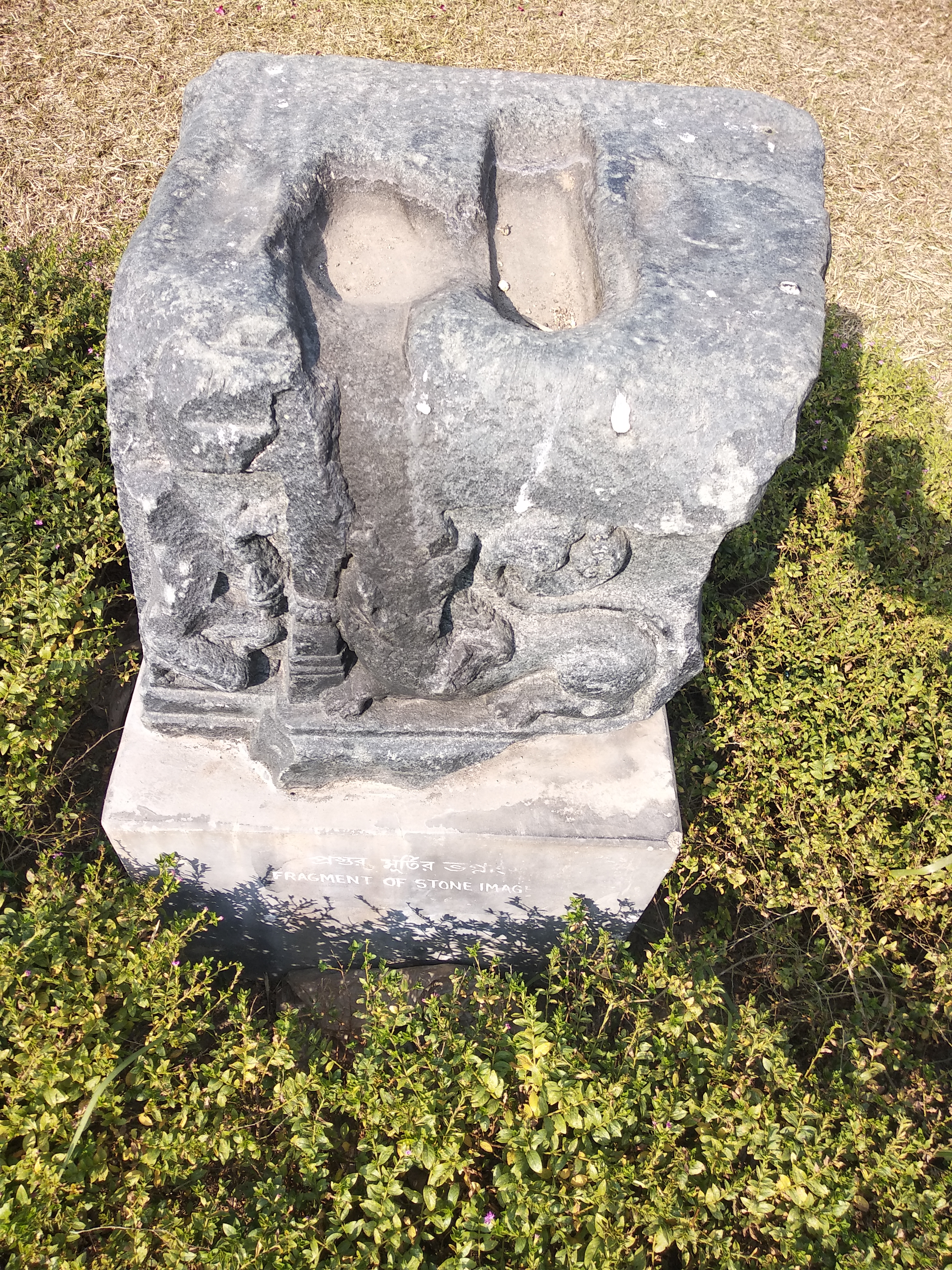
A pristine historical stone in Mahasthangarh, Bogra, Bangladesh

India possesses a wide spectrum of dimensional stones including granite, marble, sandstone, limestone, slate, and quartzite, found across various parts of the country.

The stone industry in India has evolved to focus on the production and manufacturing of blocks, flooring slabs, structural slabs, monuments, tombstones, sculptures, cobbles, pebbles, and landscape garden stones.

== Tradition of stones ==
India's history, dating back to 3200 BC, has been influenced considerably by the disposition, development, and use of stones and other construction materials. Dimension stones have also left deep imprints on the architectural heritage of the country. Innumerable temples, forts and palaces of Ancient Indian Civilisation have been carved out of locally available stones. Some of the rock-cut structures include Khajuraho Temple, Elephanta Caves, Lomesh rishi caves, Ellora caves and Konark Temple. Besides, all major archaeological excavations have revealed exquisitely carved statuettes and carvings in stone. Ancient Buddhist monuments like the Sanchi Stupa of the 3rd century BC have also been carved out of stone.

This tradition of Stone Architecture has continued into the present era, with most of the important modern buildings in India such as the Rashtrapati Bhavan (Presidential Mansion), Parliament House, and Supreme Court made from high-quality sandstone of Rajasthan. The Bahá'í House of Worship of New Delhi stands as testimony to the relevance of marble in modern Indian architecture.

Stones are still the mainstays of civil construction in India, with stones being used extensively in public buildings, hotels, and temples. They are increasingly being used in homes, with the use of stones now penetrating amongst the growing middle class of India.

The success of the commercial stone industry solely depends on defects in rock/stone. Natural defects in ornamental/commercial the rock deposits adversely affect the quality of rock deposit. detection of natural defects in decorative and dimensional stone industry play vital role in the quality assessment.

India is pioneer in exploration and mining of commercial rock deposits and in establishing a firm base for stone industry. India, with an estimated resource of about 1,690 million cubic metres, comprising over 160 shades of Dimension Stone Granites (DSG), accounts for about 205 of the world's resources. Of the 300 varieties being traded in the world market, nearly half of them are from India. Commercially viable granite and other rock deposits are reported from Andhra Pradesh, Bihar, Gujarat, Karnataka, Madhya Pradesh, Maharashtra, Odisha, Rajasthan, Tamil Nadu, Uttar Pradesh, Telangana, and others.

== Deposits ==
=== Marble ===
Marble has been used for building tombs, temples and palaces. For a time, it was regarded a Royal Stone. However, it is currently utilized in hotels and residences. There are many varieties.

- Makrana: Makrana is the source of the marble used in the Taj Mahal. It is situated at a distance of 60 km from Kishangarh and falls in the Nagaur district of Rajasthan. The region has various mining ranges, mainly Doongri, Devi, Ulodi, Saabwali, Gulabi, Kumari, Neharkhan, Matabhar, Matabhar Kumari, Chuck Doongri, Chosira and Pahar Kua among others.
- Rajnagar Marble: World's largest marble-producing area, with over 2,000 gang-saw units located in the nearby town of Udaipur to process the material produced. Agaria is a variety of this area, with numerous other varieties and patterns, primarily with a white base. The marble is dolomitic and often has quartz intrusions.
- Andhi Marble: Located near the capital city of the state of Jaipur (also known as the 'Pink City'), it is dolomitic marble with intrusions of tremolite, and is commonly known by the name of pista (pistachio) marble, because of the green coloured tremolite against an off-white background. One of the famous varieties of this area was known as Indo-Italian, owing to its resemblance to Satvario Marble. Most of the mining of this famous field is now banned by the Supreme Court of India because of the vicinity of the area to the Sariska Tiger Reserve.
- Salumber Marble: Also known as Onyx Marble, it has thick bands of green and pink hint. A resemblance to Onyx Marble from Pakistan gives it this name. It is also highly dolomitic.
- Yellow Marble (Limestone): Jaisalmer stone is found in the Jaisalmer district of Rajasthan. Though it has not been metamorphosed and hence is still a limestone, it is known as Yellow Marble in trade circles. It is mined in the Jaisalmer District.
- Bidasar: These are ultrabasic rocks in shades of brown and green color found in Rajasthan. The criss-cross linear pattern gives it a remarkable resemblance to a photograph of a dense forest. These are also known as forest green/brown or fancy green/brown.
- Morwad: Kishangarh Marble
- Gujarat - AmbaJi White Marble: It can be compared with Makarana Marble. It is highly calcic and is produced in a town called Ambaji (famous for its temple of Durga Devi). The marble has a very soft and waxy look and is often used by sculptors.
- Rajasthan - Abu Black: This is one of the rare black textured marble available. Only produced in the mines of Abu road, this black textured stone is a decorative marble used in temples and sculptures.
- Madhya Pradesh - Katni Range: It is famous for its beige-colored marble, which is dolomitic but highly crystalline, with very fine grain size and some quartz intrusions. The marble accepts polish. Another variety in the same range is red/maroon-colored marble.
- 'Jabalpur range' contains white dolomitic marble. Dolomitic marble is a metamorphic rock that forms when dolomite is subjected to high temperatures and pressures. Dolomite is a mineral composed of calcium and magnesium carbonate. When dolomite undergoes metamorphism, it recrystallizes into marble. And this newly formed marble is called dolomite marble. It is often used as dolomite lumps for chemical and industrial uses.
- Indian Green Marble: It is found in Rajasthan, India; Indian Green Marble's most quarries are situated in Kesariyaji, which is 60 km far from Udaipur, Rajasthan India. This Indian green marble is known by name all over the world. In Europe, people know Indian green marble as a Verde Guatemala. Many varieties are available in Indian green marble. Indian Green Marble is exported to Africa, Europe, Australia, the Middle East, and many Asian countries. It is found in Rishabhdeo town of Udaipur District state Rajasthan of India.

=== Granite ===
Granite is an igneous rock, which means it formed from magma, or melted rock. It forms deep inside the Earth under a mountain or volcano when melted rock cools or crystallizes into solid rock. Over time, wind, ice, and water wear away at the mountain or volcano above it, and the granite is exposed to the surface. India has varieties of granite in over 250 shades. As of 2005, Granite reserves in India was 37,426 million cubic meters and ranked fifth in the export of processed product. Resources are found in Odisha, Tamil Nadu, Karnataka, Jharkhand, Chhattisgarh, Rajasthan, Telangana, and Andhra Pradesh.

=== Sandstone ===
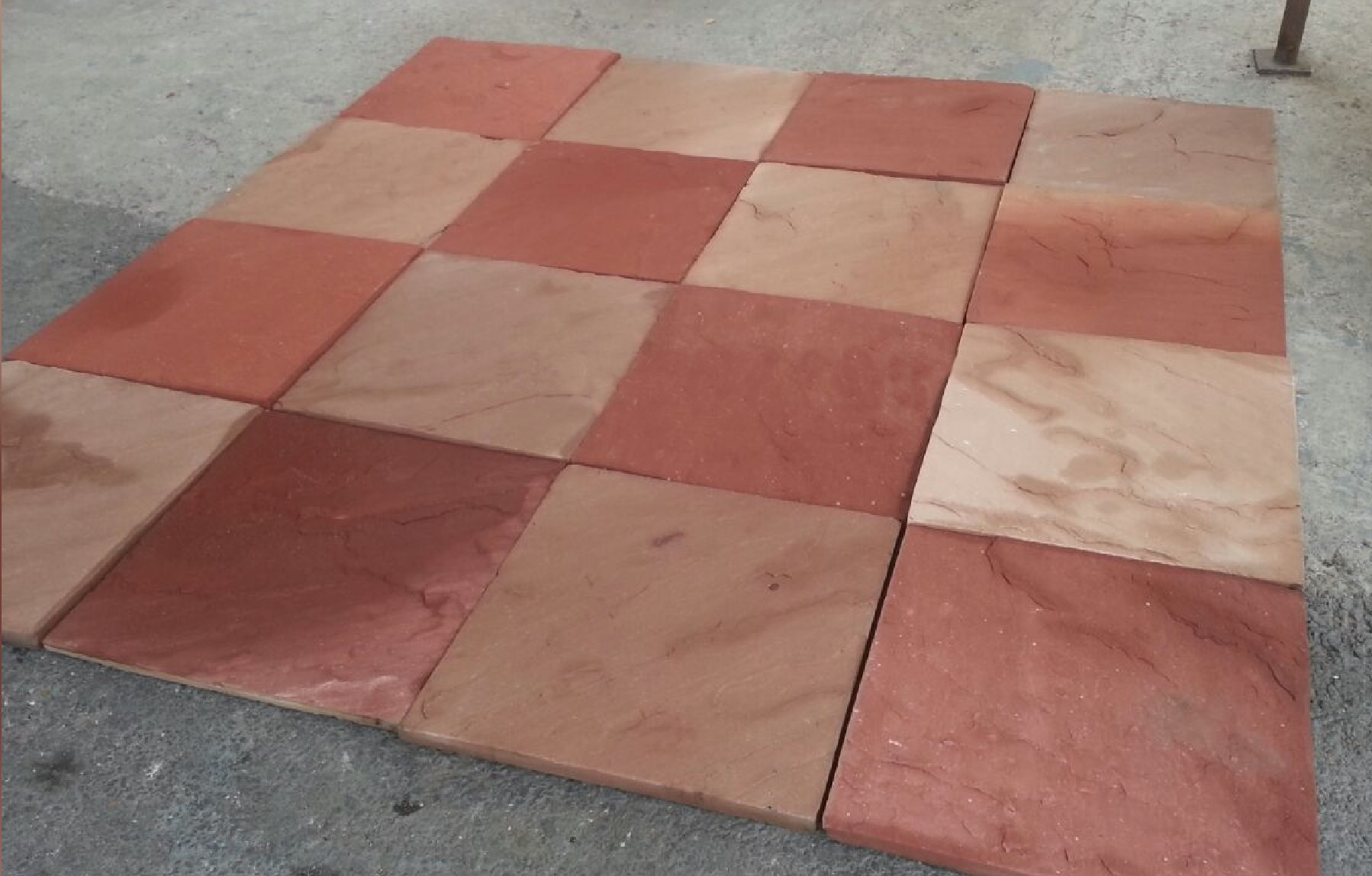
Red and beige Dholpur stone tiles

Sandstone reserves in India are found over the states of Andhra Pradesh, Assam, Bihar, Gujarat, Haryana, Madhya Pradesh, Meghalaya, Mizoram, Karnataka, Odisha, Punjab, Rajasthan, Uttar Pradesh, Tamil Nadu and West Bengal. Over 90% of the deposits of sandstone are in Rajasthan, spread over the districts of Bharatpur, Dholpur, Kota, Jodhpur, Sawai-Madhopur, Bundi, Chittorgarh, Bikaner, Jhalawar, Pali, Shivpuri, Khatu and Jaisalmer.

India is among the leading countries when it comes to mining and export of sandstone. Sandstone from India is available in different colors for interior as well as exterior use. Sandstone products from India include names like Tint Mint, White Mint, Mint Fossils, Modak, Agra Red, Rainbow Sandstone, Raj Green, Teak, Buff Brown, Dhoplur Chocolate, Beige, Dholpur Pink, Lalitpur Pink, Mandana Red, Jodhpur pink, Jodhpur red, and Jaisalmer yellow.

=== Slate ===
Slate reserves in India are found in Rajasthan, Behror, Haryana, Himachal Pradesh, Andhra Pradesh, and Madhya Pradesh. Deposits in Rajasthan are spread over the districts of Alwar, Ajmer, Bharatpur, Tonk, Sawai Madhopur, Pali, Udaipur, Churu, and Chittorgarh.

Few important names in slate are Jak Black, Silver Shine, Silver grey, Panther, Deoli Green, Peacock, Peacock Multi, Kund Black, Kund Multi, and so on. Being to some extent fragile in nature, it is good for interior use only and can be used in even as a washboard.

=== Flaggy limestone ===
Kotastone of Kota district and Yellow Limestone of Jaisalmer district of Rajasthan are the prime limestone occurrences in India. Other deposits include the Shahabad Stone of Gulbarga and the Belgaum districts of Karnataka, Kadappa Stone of Kadapa, Kurnool and the Anantapur & Guntur districts of Andhra Pradesh, Milliolitic Limestone from Saurashtra Region, Gujarat, and 'Yellow Limestone' of Kutch district of Gujarat, amongst others.

==== Limestone deposits ====
Andhra Pradesh and Telangana put, together, possess 32% of the country's total reserves of limestone. World-renowned Narzi limestone is available in Kadapa district. Commercial grade limestone deposits are being exploited from Bethamcherla, Macherla, Neereducherla, Tandur, ((shahabad)), Mudimanikyam of Kurnool, Guntur, Anantapur, Rangareddy, and Nalgonda districts are widely used in our country for paneling, and flooring purposes. Sullavai limestone of Karminagar and Warangal districts, massive limestones of Mudimanikyam, Nalgonda districts. Total India's limestones are estimated about 93,623 million tonnes. Limestones are extensively utilized for the manufacturing of cement and also building stones, particularly flooring, and roofing.

=== Other dimensional stones ===
There are some other dimensional stones being quarried and used in consumption, in addition to the dimensional stones already detailed above. Laterite bricks are quarried in huge quantities and are utilized as bricks in the construction of houses and for pavements in the states of Orissa, Karnataka, Goa, and in other parts of coastal states. The felspathic sandstone occurring with the coal seams as overburden is also used as building stone. The huge deposits of basalt in the states of Maharashtra, Karnataka, and Gujarat have been used as building stones since ancient times. Other quartzitic bands, occurring with phyllites and schists, are also utilized for building purposes. Khondelites from the Eastern coast are being used widely in sculptures and as a building material. Felsite from Karnataka is being extensively used as a dimensional stone as well. India also contains many stones which are semiprecious like zoisite, apophyllite, cavansite, muscovite mica, almandine, etc.

== See also ==
Mining in India
