= WKT =

WKT may refer to:

- Well-known text representation of coordinate reference systems, a text markup language for representing coordinate reference systems
- Well-known text representation of geometry, a text markup language for representing vector geometry objects
- WKT (sealant), a marine sealant
- West Kowloon Terminus, a railway station in Hong Kong
- Wiktionary abbreviation
