= Bleb =

Bleb may refer to:

- Bleb (cell biology), an irregular bulge in the plasma membrane of a cell
- Bleb (medicine), a large blister filled with serous fluid, or jargon for an outpouching of any kind, from a vessel (see Aneurysm), or an air pocket in the lungs (see Focal lung pneumatosis)
- Bleb (mineralogy), a small bubble-like inclusion of one mineral within a larger mineral
- Bleb, a book of poetry written by B-52's frontman Fred Schneider
