= Stone sealer =

Methods used to protect natural stone

Stone sealing is the application of a surface treatment to products constructed of natural stone to retard staining and corrosion. All bulk natural stone is riddled with interconnected capillary channels that permit penetration by liquids and gases. This is true for igneous rock types such as granite and basalt, metamorphic rocks such as marble and slate, and sedimentary rocks such as limestone, travertine, and sandstone. These porous channels act like a sponge, and capillary action draws in liquids over time, along with any dissolved salts and other solutes. Very porous stone, such as sandstone absorb liquids relatively quickly, while denser igneous stones such as granite are significantly less porous; they absorb smaller volumes, and more slowly, especially when absorbing viscous liquids.

== Motivation ==
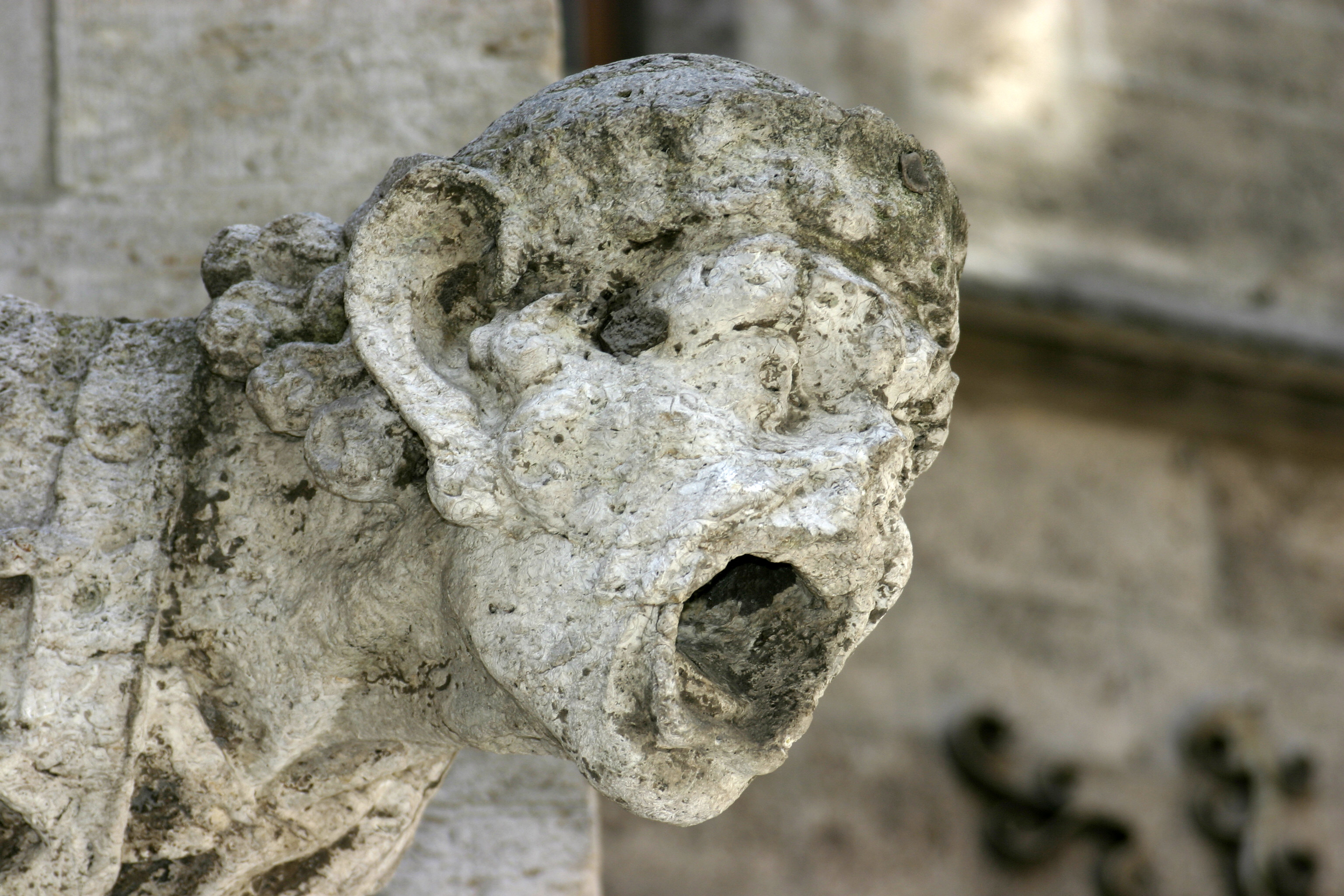
Gargoyle in Bavaria damaged by acid rain

Natural stone is used in kitchens, floors, walls, bathrooms, dining rooms, around swimming pools, building foyers, public areas and facades. Since ancient times, stone has been popular for building and decorative purposes. It has been valued for its strength, durability, and insulation properties. It can be cut, cleft, or sculpted to shape as required, and the variety of natural stone types, textures, and colors provide an exceptionally versatile range of building materials. The porosity and makeup of most stone does, however, leave it prone to certain types of damage if unsealed.

- Staining is the most common form of damage. It is the result of oils or other liquids penetrating deeply into the capillary channels and depositing material that is effectively impossible to remove without destroying the stone.
- Salt Attack occurs when salts dissolved in water are carried into the stone. The two commonest effects are efflorescence and spalling. Salts that expand on crystallization in capillary gaps can cause surface spalling. For example, various magnesium and calcium salts in sea water expand considerably on drying by taking on water of crystallization. However, even sodium chloride, which does not include water of crystallization, can exert considerable expansive forces as its crystals grow.
- Efflorescence is the formation of a gritty deposit, commonly white, on the surface. Efflorescence is usually the result of mineral solutions in the capillary channels being drawn to the surface. If the water evaporates, the minerals remain as the so-called efflorescence. It also can be the result of chemical reaction; if badly prepared cement-based mortar is applied to maintain the stone in position, free calcium hydroxide may leach out. In the open air the lime reacts with carbon dioxide to form water-insoluble calcium carbonate that might take the form of powdery efflorescence or dripstone-like crusting.
- Acid Attack. Acid-soluble stone materials such as the calcite in marble, limestone and travertine, as well as the internal cement that binds the resistant grains in sandstone, react with acidic solutions on contact, or on absorbing acid-forming gases in polluted air, such as oxides of sulfur or nitrogen. Acid erodes the stone, leaving dull marks on polished surfaces. In time it may cause deep pitting, eventually totally obliterating the forms of statues, memorials and other sculptures. Even mild household acids, including cola, wine, vinegar, lemon juice and milk, can damage vulnerable types of stone. The milder the acid, the longer it takes to etch calcite-based stone; stronger acids can cause irreparable damage in seconds.
- Picture Framing occurs when water or grout moves into the edges of the stone to create an unsightly darkening or "frame" affect. Such harm is usually irreversible.
- Freeze-thaw Spalling results when water freezes in the surface pores. The general term is Frost weathering. The water expands on freezing, causing the stone to spall, crumble, or even to crack through.

== Protection of stone ==
The longevity and usefulness of stone can be extended by sealing its surface effectively, so as to exclude harmful liquids and gases. The ancient Romans often used olive oil to seal their stone. Such treatment provides some protection by excluding water and other weathering agents, but it stains the stone permanently.

During the renaissance Europeans experimented with the use of topical varnishes and sealants made from ingredients such as egg white, natural resins and silica, which were clear, could be applied wet and harden to form a protective skin. Most such measures did not last long, and some proved harmful in the long run.

== Modern sealers ==
Modern stone sealers are divided into 3 broad types: topical sealers, penetrating sealers, and impregnating sealers.

=== Topical sealers ===
Topical sealers are generally made from polyurethanes, acrylics, or natural wax. These sealers may be effective at stopping stains but, being exposed on the surface of the material, they tend to wear out relatively quickly, especially on high-traffic areas of flooring. This type of sealer will significantly change the look and slip resistance of the surface, especially when it is wet. These sealers are not breathable i.e. do not allow the escape of water vapour and other gases, and are not effective against salt attack, such as efflorescence and spalling.

=== Penetrating sealers ===
The most penetrating sealers use siliconates, fluoro-polymers and siloxanes, which repel liquids. These sealers penetrate the surface of the stone enough to anchor the material to the surface. They are generally longer lasting than topical sealers and often do not substantially alter the look of the stone, but still can change the slip characteristics of the surface and do wear relatively quickly. Penetrating sealers often require the use of special cleaners which both clean and top up the repellent ingredient left on the stone surface. These sealers are often breathable to a certain degree, but do not penetrate deeply enough (generally less than 1mm) to be effective against salt attack, such as efflorescence and spalling.

=== Impregnating sealers ===
Uses silanes or modified silanes. These are a type of penetrating sealer, which penetrate deeply into the material, impregnating it with molecules which bond to the capillary pores and repels water and / or oils from within the material. Some modified silane sealers impregnate deeply enough to protect against salt attack, such as efflorescence, spalling, picture framing and freeze-thaw spalling. Some silane stone sealers based on nanotechnology claim to be resistant to UV light and higher pH levels found in new masonry and pointing. A good depth of penetration is also essential for protection from weathering and traffic.

== See also ==
- Dimension stone
