= Paint sealant =

A paint sealant is a sealant that protects cars from ultraviolet rays and acid rain. Paint sealants protect cars' finishes, and can make cars shiny. There are synthetic sealants and carnauba waxes.

Salt may be a factor that many protective sealants do not defend against, and thus salt water may break down protective layers to get at the metal and corrode it.

Paint sealant works by filling into the pores and irregular surface of the body thereby creating a smooth finish on top. The way it helps is it denies a sticking surface to foreign substance and they come off the car easily without further damaging the car surface.
