= TEAC =

TEAC may refer to:

- TEAC Corporation, a Japanese electronics company
- TEAC Oval, a sports stadium in Port Melbourne, Australia
- Tetraethylammonium chloride, a chemical compound
- Trolox equivalent antioxidant capacity, a measure of antioxidant capacity
- Thorium Energy Alliance Conference
- TEAC Australia, an Australian electronics distributor of TEAC branded electronics manufactured by a generic electronics manufacturer in China. No affiliation with TEAC Japan or its manufacturers.
