= Morwad =

Village in Maharashtra

Coordinates: 18°37′N 76°28′E

- village
- Location in Maharashtra, India Morwad (India)
- Country: India
- State: Maharashtra
- District: Solapur district

Languages
  - Official: Marathi
- Time zone: UTC+5:30 (IST)

Morwad is a village in the Karmala taluka of Solapur district in Maharashtra state, India.

== Demographics ==
Covering 1,093 hectares (2,700 acres) and comprising 346 households at the time of the 2011 census of India, Morwad had a population of 1734. There were 897 males and 837 females, with 204 people being aged six or younger.
