= Sealant =

Substance used to block the passage of fluids through openings

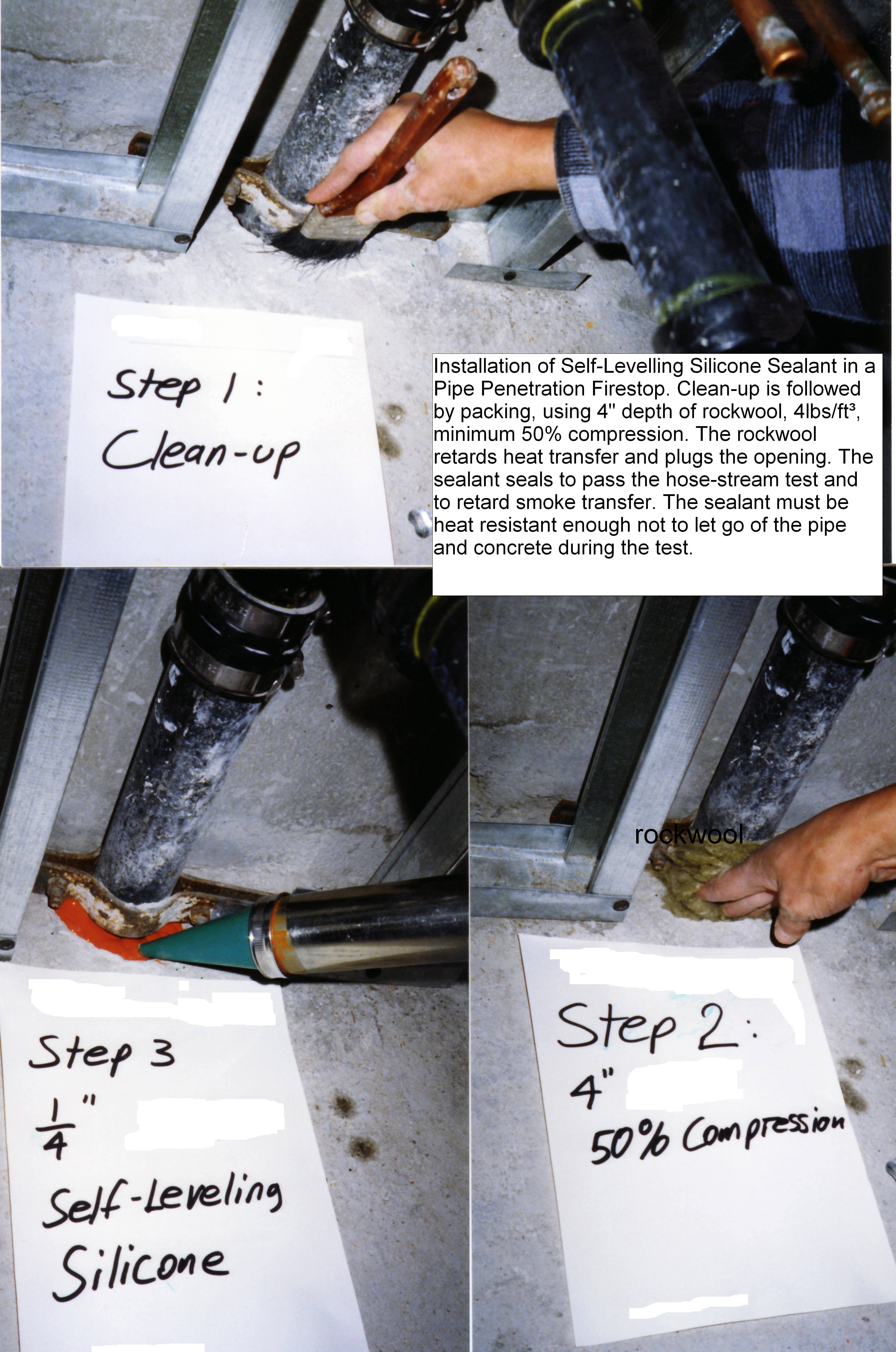
Self-leveling silicone firestop system used around pipe through-penetration in a two-hour fire-resistance rated concrete floor assembly.

Sealant is a substance used to block the passage of fluids through openings in materials, a type of mechanical seal. In building construction sealant is sometimes synonymous with caulk (especially if acrylic latex or polyurethane based) and also serve the purposes of blocking dust, sound and heat transmission. Sealants may be weak or strong, flexible or rigid, permanent or temporary. Sealants are not adhesives but some have adhesive qualities and are called adhesive-sealants or structural sealants.

== History ==
Sealants were first used in prehistory in the broadest sense as mud, grass and reeds to seal dwellings from the weather such as the daub in wattle and daub and quincha. Natural sealants and adhesive-sealants included pine pitch and birch pitch, bitumen, wax, tar, natural gum, clay (mud) mortar, lime mortar, lead, blood, and egg. In the 17th century glazing putty was first used to seal window glass made with linseed oil and chalk, later other drying oils were also used to make oil-based putties. In the 1920s, polymers such as acrylic polymers, butyl polymers and silicone polymers were first developed and used in sealants. By the 1960s, synthetic-polymer-based sealants were widely available.

== Function ==
Sealants, despite not having great strength, convey a number of properties. They seal top structures to the substrate, and are particularly effective in waterproofing processes by keeping moisture out (or in) the components in which they are used. They can provide thermal and acoustical insulation, and may serve as fire barriers.

Sealants are frequently used in both interior and exterior construction to provide waterproofing and draughtproofing, while also improving the overall aesthetic finish of a building. Silicone sealants are commonly applied around skirting boards, window glazing, doorframes, and woodwork, owing to their flexibility, to create a neat appearance as well as a durable seal. In addition to standard formulations, manufacturers such as AB Building Products and Soudal offer ranges of coloured silicone sealants designed to meet both practical and aesthetic requirements.

They may have electrical properties, as well. Sealants can also be used for simple smoothing or filling. They are often called upon to perform several of these functions at once.

A caulking sealant has three basic functions: It fills a gap between two or more substrates; it forms a barrier due to the physical properties of the sealant itself and by adhesion to the substrate; and it maintains sealing properties for the expected lifetime, service conditions, and environments. The sealant performs these functions by way of correct formulation to achieve specific application and performance properties. Other than adhesives, however, there are few functional alternatives to the sealing process.

Soldering or welding can perhaps be used as alternatives in certain instances, depending on the substrates and the relative movement that the substrates will see in service. However, the simplicity and reliability offered by organic elastomers usually make them the clear choice for performing these functions.

== Types ==
A sealant may be viscous with little or no flow characteristics and which stays where it is applied, or it may be thin and runny to penetrate the substrate by capillary action.

Anaerobic acrylic sealants (generally referred to as impregnants) are required to cure in the absence of air. Surface sealants require air as part of the cure mechanism that changes state to become solid, once applied, and are used to prevent the penetration of air, gas, noise, dust, fire, smoke, or liquid.

Sealants can be categorized in accordance with varying criteria, e. g. in accordance with the reactivity of the product in the ready-to-use condition or on the basis of its mechanical behavior after installation. A typical classification system for most commonly used sealants is shown below.

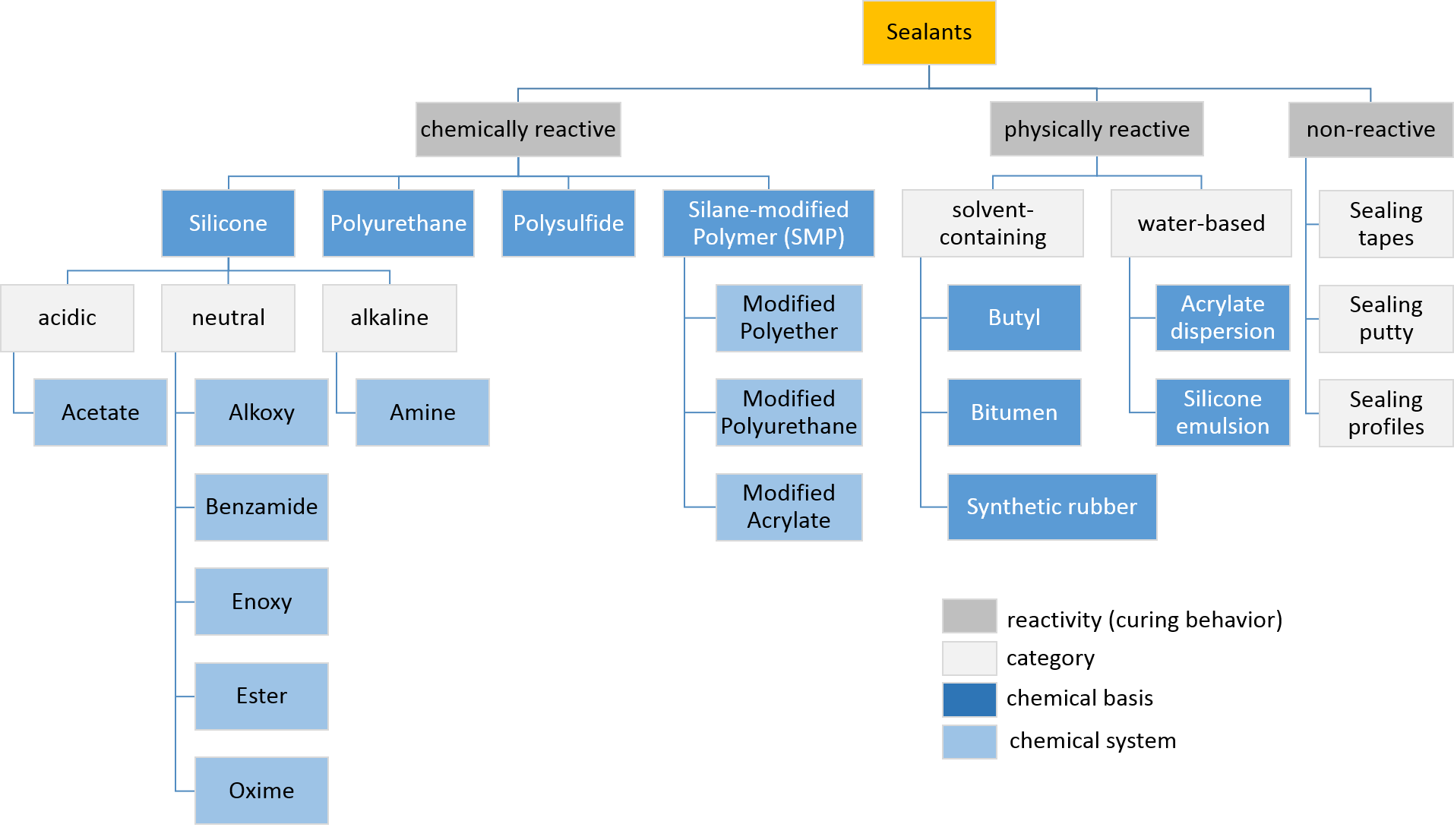
Classification of sealants by reactivity and chemistry

Types of sealants fall between the higher-strength, adhesive-derived sealers and coatings at one end, and extremely low-strength putties, waxes, and caulks at the other. Putties and caulks serve only one function – i.e., to take up space and fill voids. Sealants may be based on silicone.

Other common types of sealants:

- Acrylic resins
- Acrylic latex
- Acoustic sealants
- Adhesive sealants
- Butyl rubber
- Dental sealants
- Elastic sealants
- Electronic sealants
- Epoxy thermosets
- Extruded sealants
- Fibrin glue
- Firestop barrier sealants
- Floor sealant
- Foam
- Grout
- Hot wax
- Impregnating sealants
- Latex sealants
- Metal sealants
- Patio sealants
- Paint sealants
- Plastic sealants
- Polysulfide sealants
- Polyurethane sealants
- Rubber sealants
- Sealcoat
- Seam sealants
- Silicone sealant
- Spackling paste
- Stone sealer
- Surgical sealant
- Tile sealant
- Urethane sealants
- Valve seal
- Varnish
- WKT

== Common areas of use ==
- Automotive industry
- Architectural
- Asphalt
- Pipe threads
- Aerospace industry
- Aircraft
- Aquariums
- Casting
- Cement/Concrete
- Engines
- Gaskets
- Glass
- HVAC systems
- Hydraulic systems
- Marine industry
- Military grade
- Radiators
- Reservoirs
- Roofs
- Tires
- Wood

== Aerospace sealants ==
- Firewall Sealants – a two-component, firewall sealant intended for use as a coating, sealant or filleting material in the construction, repair and maintenance of aircraft and is especially useful where fire resistance, exposure to phosphate ester fluids, and/or exposure to extreme temperatures, −65 °F (−54 °C) to 400 °F (204 °C) are major considerations.
- Fuel Tank Sealants – High-temperature fuel resistant sealant intended for use on integral fuel tanks with excellent resistance to other fluids such as water, alcohols, synthetic oils and petroleum-based hydraulic fluids
- Access Door Sealants – Access door sealant intended for use on integral fuel tanks and pressurized cabins with low adhesion characteristics and excellent resistance to other fluids such as water, alcohols, synthetic oils and petroleum based hydraulic fluids.
- Windshield Sealant – demonstrated to be a useful sealant in a variety of applications where quick setting is desired, for example, windshield sealants, repair caulks, adhesives, etc.

== Comparison with adhesives ==
The main difference between adhesives and sealants is that sealants typically have lower strength and higher elongation than adhesives do. When sealants are used between substrates having different thermal coefficients of expansion or differing elongation under stress, they need to have adequate flexibility and elongation. Sealants generally contain inert filler material and are usually formulated with an elastomer to give the required flexibility and elongation. They usually have a paste consistency to allow filling of gaps between substrates. Low shrinkage after application is often required. Sealants also typically require a sufficient compression set, especially when the sealant is a foam gasket. Many adhesive technologies can be formulated into sealants.
