= WKT (sealant) =

WKT is a sealing compound that was developed by Paul Pietzschke at the Chemisch-Technische Fabrik in Hamburg, Germany in 1962. It was made for the yacht and ship building industries. WKT belongs to the silicone group of sealants.

== Properties ==
WKT is an elastic and non-aging sealant. It is a silicone rubber and one of the first fully synthetic sealants for the commercial marine industry. The active ingredient in WKT sealing compound is polydimethylsiloxane. WKT is used in applications such as the construction and building industry, windows and glazing, interior industry, plant engineering and construction, grommet maintenance, manufacturing industry, recreational vehicles (RV), and aircraft industries.

== Characteristics ==
WKT is UV resistant and maintains elasticity and adhesive force over time, even in environments with higher UV exposure like tropical and arctic climates. It does not lose its elasticity under varying mechanical stress.

== Safety ==
WKT is physiologically harmless in its cured form.

== Other types of sealants ==
- Acrylic sealants
- Polysulfide sealants
- Polyurethane sealants

== See also ==
- Paul Pietzschke
- Sealant
