= Teak furniture =

Furniture made of teak wood

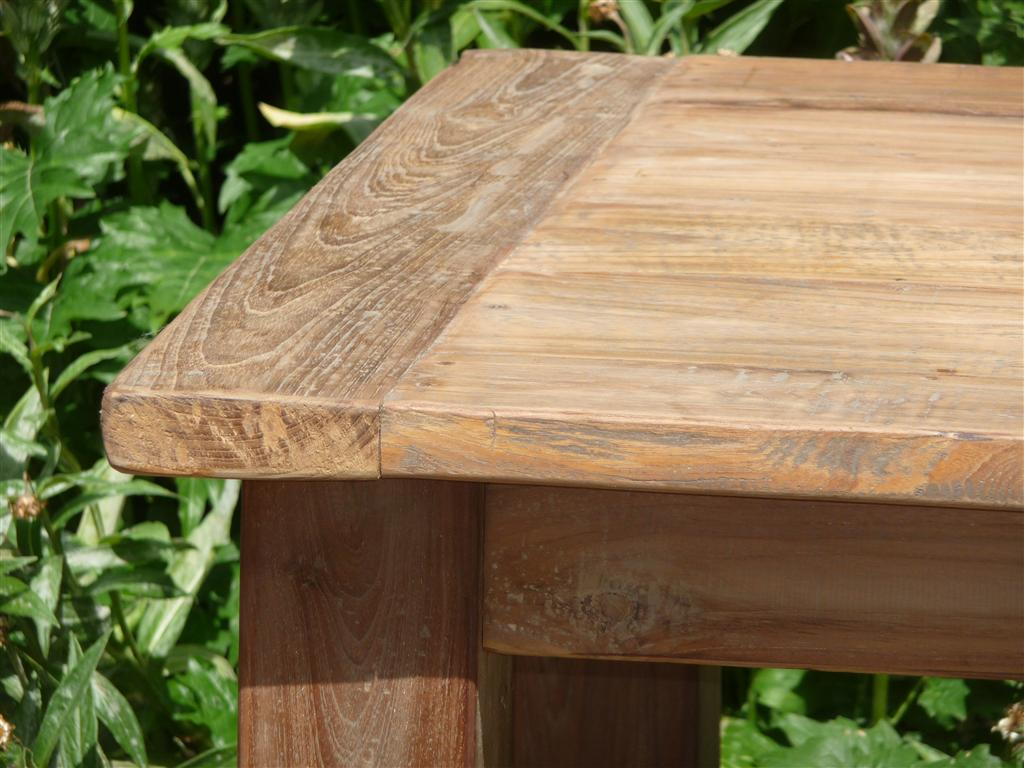
Close-up of a table made of teak wood

Teak furniture is furniture made of teak wood, valued for its durability and natural resistance to weather and pests.

Teak is also used in boatbuilding and other outdoor applications. High-quality teak pieces can last for many decades and are sometimes passed down as heirlooms. Because of its price and longevity, teak furniture is often regarded as a status symbol.

== Types of teak furniture ==
Teak is harvested from Tectona grandis, native to South and Southeast Asia. Many manufacturers source wood from certified plantations to limit environmental impact and ensure sustainability.

=== Tables and dining sets ===
Outdoor dining tables and chairs made of teak resist rain, sun and temperature extremes more effectively than many softwoods and synthetics.

=== Benches ===
Teak benches are common in gardens and parks because the wood resists rot and insect damage without chemical treatment.

=== Chaise longues ===
Poolside and beachside chaise longues are often made of teak; the wood stays cooler than metal in strong sun and endures constant moisture.

=== Adirondack chairs ===
Traditional Adirondack chairs are sometimes built from teak, combining the style’s comfort with the wood’s longevity.

=== Umbrella frames ===
Teak has historically been used for patio-umbrella masts and ribs. Aluminium is now more common, but teak remains popular for premium garden umbrellas.

=== Bath mats ===
The natural oils in teak repel water and inhibit mould growth, making the wood suitable for bath and spa mats.

=== Deep seating ===
Deep-seating outdoor sofas and sectionals often use teak frames paired with weatherproof cushions because the wood can support heavy loads for many years without warping.

== Teak oil ==
Teak oil is a marketing term for oil-based finishes (usually linseed-based) sold for treating teak and other hardwoods. These products do not contain oil from the teak tree. Untreated teak weathers to a silver-grey patina but remains structurally sound; finishing is therefore optional.

== Bibliography ==
- Business in Indonesia: New Challenges, Old Problems. Institute of Southeast Asian Studies, 2004. ISBN 978-9812302472.
- Pongsawat, Pitch (2009). “Border Partial Citizenship, Border Towns, and Thai-Myanmar Cross-border Development.” In Labour in the Greater Mekong Subregion, Chulalongkorn University.
- Roda, J.-M.; Buitenzorgy, M.; Wit, M. (2006). “Teak furniture and business responsibility: a global value chain dynamics approach.” International Forestry Review 8 (3): 306–322.
