= Bleb (mineralogy) =

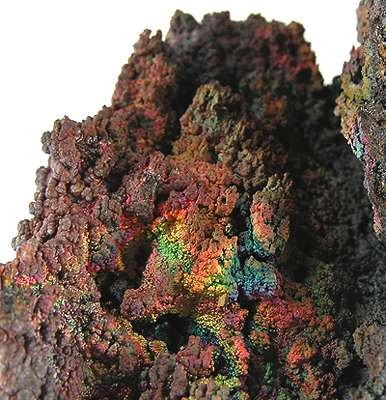
A specimen of goethite with blebs of green malachite

In geology, mineralogy, and petrology, a bleb is a small bubble-like inclusion of one mineral within a larger mineral. An example is a bleb of sylvite within chlorite. Blebs tend to be brightly coloured.
