= EA-1699 =

Chemical compound and chemical warfare nerve agent

Names
- Preferred IUPAC name 2-[ethoxy(methyl)phosphoryl]sulfanyl-N,N-dimethylethanamine
- Other names S-(2-(Dimethylamino)ethyl) O-ethyl P-methylphosphonothioate; IIVX; Medemo

Identifiers
CAS Number	20820-80-8
3D model (JSmol)	Interactive image
ChemSpider	92416
PubChem CID	102302
UNII	ZW9J8DK4QM
CompTox Dashboard (EPA)	DTXSID00864962
- InChI: InChI=1S/C7H18NO2PS/c1-5-10-11(4,9)12-7-6-8(2)3/h5-7H2,1-4H3 Key: PKDYQTANBZBIRM-UHFFFAOYSA-N
- SMILES: CCOP(C)(=O)SCCN(C)C

Properties
Chemical formula	C_{7}H_{18}NO_{2}PS
Molar mass	211.26 g·mol^{−1}
Density	1.06 g/ml
Boiling point	200 °C to 250 °C
Solubility in water	248 g/L

Hazards
NFPA 704 (fire diamond)	4 1 1
- Lethal dose or concentration (LD, LC)
LD_{50} (median dose)	17 μg/kg (intravenous, rat); 23.6 μg/kg (intramuscular, rat); 54.5 μg/kg (intraperitoneal, rat); 121.9 μg/kg (oral, rat)
- Except where otherwise noted, data are given for materials in their standard state (at 25 °C [77 °F], 100 kPa). Infobox references

EA-1699, also known as IIVX, is an extremely toxic synthetic chemical compound in the organophosphorus class, specifically, a thiophosphonate. It was derived from the more widely known nerve agent VX and can be seen as the dimethyl analogue of it.

Indicators of EA-1699 have been detected at a Syrian chemical weapons production facility.

== Synthesis ==
The synthesis of EA-1699 is analogous to that of VX with the N,N-diisopropylaminoethanol being replaced with N,N-dimethylaminoethanol.

The B in the following diagram denotes a base with diethylaniline being described as a suitable one in literature.
