= Methyl acrylate =

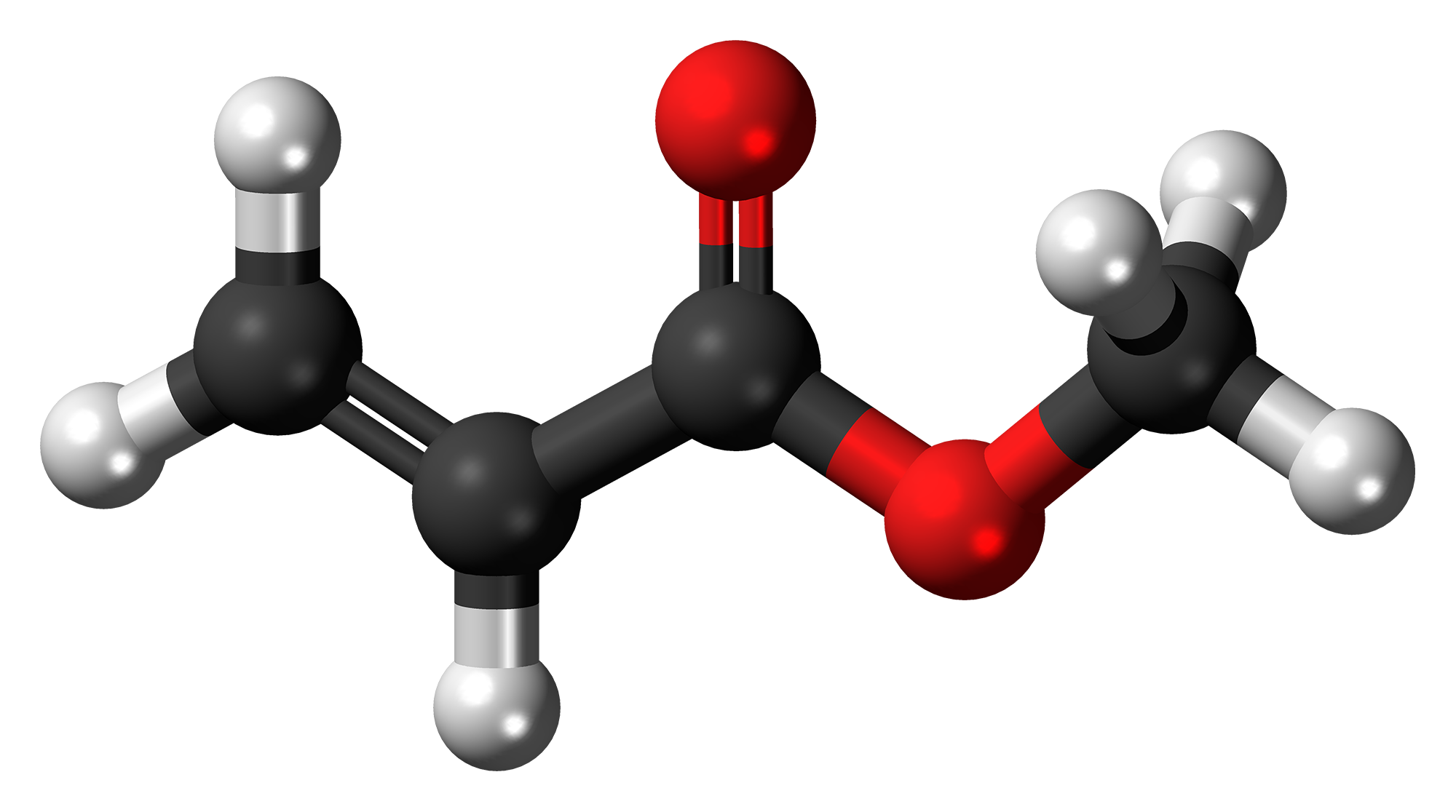

Names
- Preferred IUPAC name Methyl prop-2-enoate
- Other names Methyl acrylate Methyl propenoate Methoxycarbonylethylene; Curithane 103

Identifiers
CAS Number	96-33-3
3D model (JSmol)	Interactive image
ChEMBL	ChEMBL9019
ChemSpider	7022
ECHA InfoCard	100.002.274
KEGG	C19443
PubChem CID	7294
UNII	WC487PR91H
UN number	1919 (SDS/MSDS)
CompTox Dashboard (EPA)	DTXSID0024183
- InChI: InChI=1S/C4H6O2/c1-3-4(5)6-2/h3H,1H2,2H3 Key: BAPJBEWLBFYGME-UHFFFAOYSA-N
- SMILES: C=CC(OC)=O

Properties
Chemical formula	C_{4}H_{6}O_{2}
Molar mass	86.090 g·mol^{−1}
Appearance	Colorless liquid
Odor	Acrid
Density	0.95 g/cm^{3}
Melting point	−74 °C (−101 °F; 199 K)
Boiling point	80 °C (176 °F; 353 K)
Solubility in water	5 g/100 mL
Vapor pressure	65 mmHg (20°C)
Viscosity	0.391 mPa·s at 35 °C; 0.333 mPa·s at 45 °C

Hazards
- Occupational safety and health (OHS/OSH)
Main hazards	Harmful (Xn); Highly flammable (F+)
Flash point	−3 °C (27 °F; 270 K)
Explosive limits	2.8–25%
- Lethal dose or concentration (LD, LC)
LC_{50} (median concentration)	3575 ppm (mouse); 1350 ppm (rat, 4 hr); 1000 ppm (rat, 4 hr); 2522 ppm (rabbit, 1 hr)
- NIOSH (US health exposure limits)
PEL (Permissible)	TWA 10 ppm (35 mg/m^{3}) [skin]
REL (Recommended)	TWA 10 ppm (35 mg/m^{3}) [skin]
IDLH (Immediate danger)	250 ppm
Safety data sheet (SDS)	ChemicalBook SDS/MSDS
- Except where otherwise noted, data are given for materials in their standard state (at 25 °C [77 °F], 100 kPa). verify (what is ?) Infobox references

Methyl acrylate is an organic compound, more accurately the methyl ester of acrylic acid. It is a colourless liquid with a characteristic acrid odor. It is mainly produced to make acrylate fiber, which is used to weave synthetic carpets. It is also a reagent in the synthesis of various pharmaceutical intermediates. Owing to the tendency of methyl acrylate to polymerize, samples typically contain a polymerisation inhibitor such as hydroquinone.

== Production ==
The standard industrial reaction for producing methyl acrylate is esterification of acrylic acid with methanol under acid catalysis (sulfuric acid, p-toluenesulfonic acid or acidic ion exchangers.). The transesterification is facilitated because methanol and methyl acrylate form a low boiling azeotrope (boiling point 62–63 °C).

The patent literature describes a one-pot route involving vapor-phase oxidation of propene or 2-propenal with oxygen in the presence of methanol.

=== Other methods ===
Methyl acrylate can be prepared by debromination of methyl 2,3-dibromopropanoate with zinc. Methyl acrylate is formed in good yield on pyrolysis of methyl lactate in the presence of ethenone (ketene). Methyl lactate is a renewable "green chemical". Another patent describes the dehydration of methyl lactate over zeolites.

The nickel tetracarbonyl-catalyzed hydrocarboxylation of acetylene with carbon monoxide in the presence of methanol also yields methyl acrylate. The reaction of methyl formate with acetylene in the presence of transition metal catalysts also leads to methyl acrylate. Both, the alcoholysis of propiolactone with methanol as well as the methanolysis of acrylonitrile via intermediately formed acrylamide sulfate are also proven but obsolete processes.

== Use ==
Methyl acrylate is after butyl acrylate and ethyl acrylate the third most important acrylic ester with a worldwide annual production of about 200,000 tons in 2007. Poly(methyl acrylate) is a tacky material near room temperature, and as such it is not particularly useful as a structural material. Commonly, methyl acrylate (and other acrylate esters) are copolymerized with other alkenes to give useful engineering plastics. A variety of vinyl monomers are used, including styrene and other acrylates. The resulting copolymers give acrylic paints that are harder and more brittle than those with the homologous acrylates. Copolymerizing methyl acrylate with acrylonitrile improves their melt processability to fibers, which could be used as precursors for carbon fibers. Methyl acrylate is the precursor to fibers that are woven to make carpets.

=== Amino derivatives ===
Methyl acrylate reacts catalysed by Lewis bases in a Michael addition with amines in high yields to β-alanine derivatives which provide amphoteric surfactants when long-chain amines are used and the ester function is hydrolysed subsequently.

Acrylates are also used in the preparation of poly(amidoamine) (PAMAM) dendrimers typically by Michael addition with a primary amine.

Methyl acrylate is used for the preparation of 2-dimethylaminoethyl acrylate by transesterification with dimethylaminoethanol in significant quantities of over 50,000 tons / year.

== Reactions ==
Methyl acrylate is a classic Michael acceptor, which means that it adds nucleophiles at its terminus. For example, in the presence of a base catalyst, it adds hydrogen sulfide to give the thioether:

2 CH_{2}CHCO_{2}CH_{3} + H_{2}S → S(CH_{2}CH_{2}CO_{2}CH_{3})_{2}

It is also a good dienophile.

== Safety ==
It is an acute toxin with an LD_{50} (rats, oral) of 300 mg/kg and a TLV of 10 ppm.
