= C8H19NO =

Molecular formula

The molecular formula C_{8}H_{19}NO (molar mass: 145.24 g/mol) may refer to:

- N,N-Diisopropylaminoethanol (DIPA)
- Heptaminol
