= Daminozide =

- Skeletal formula of daminozide

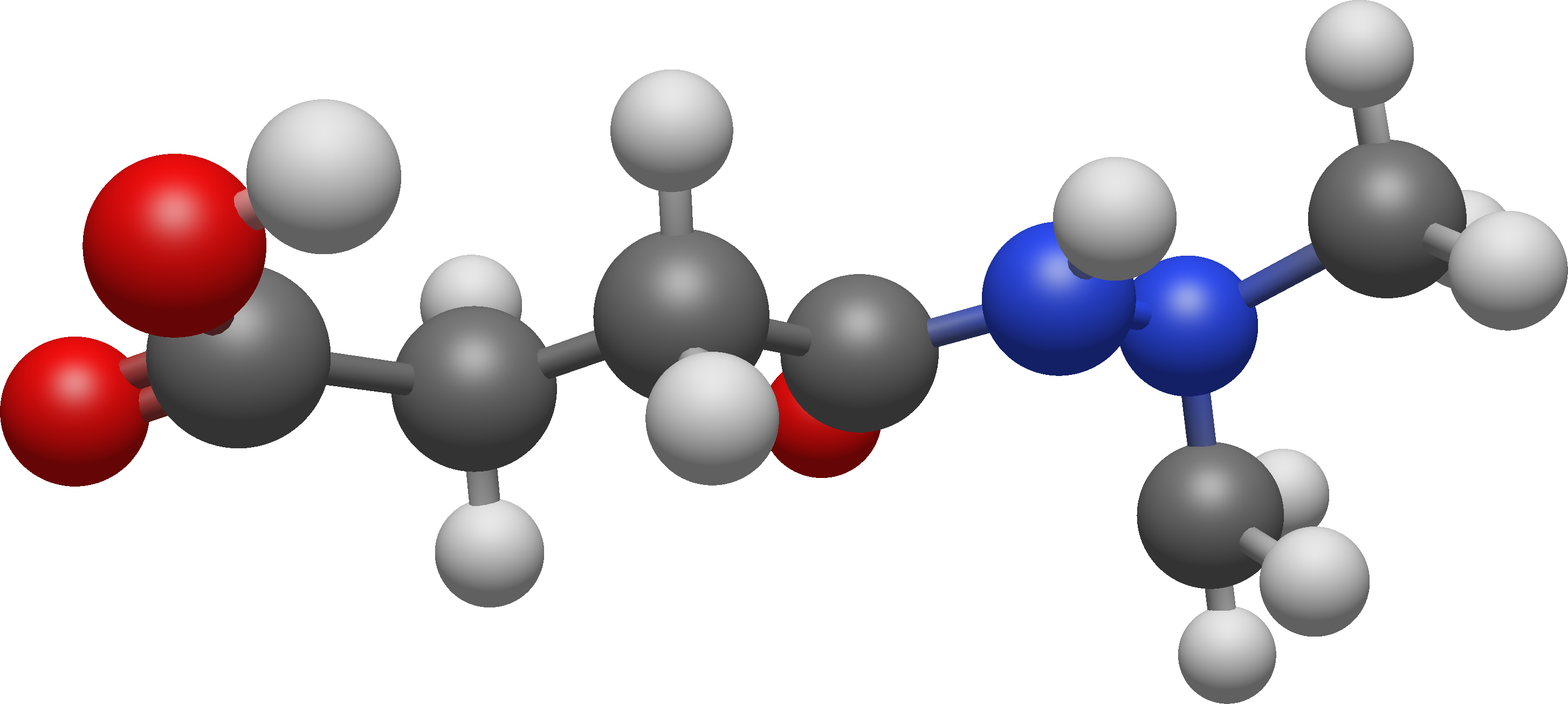
- Ball and skill formula of daminozide

Names
- Preferred IUPAC name 4-(2,2-Dimethylhydrazin-1-yl)-4-oxobutanoic acid
- Other names N-(Dimethylamino)succinamic acid; Butanedioic acid mono (2,2-dimethyl hydrazine); Succinic acid 2,2-dimethyl hydrazide

Identifiers
CAS Number	1596-84-5
3D model (JSmol)	Interactive image
Beilstein Reference	1863230
ChemSpider	14593
ECHA InfoCard	100.014.988
EC Number	216-485-9
KEGG	C10996
MeSH	daminozide
PubChem CID	15331
RTECS number	WM9625000
UNII	F6KF33M5UB
CompTox Dashboard (EPA)	DTXSID9020370
- InChI: InChI=1S/C6H12N2O3/c1-8(2)7-5(9)3-4-6(10)11/h3-4H2,1-2H3,(H,7,9)(H,10,11) Key: NOQGZXFMHARMLW-UHFFFAOYSA-N
- SMILES: CN(C)NC(=O)CCC(O)=O

Properties
Chemical formula	C_{6}H_{12}N_{2}O_{3}
Molar mass	160.173 g·mol^{−1}
Appearance	Off-white crystals
Melting point	159.24 °C; 318.63 °F; 432.39 K

Hazards
- Lethal dose or concentration (LD, LC)
LD_{50} (median dose)	>1,600 mg kg^{−1} (dermal, rabbit); 8,400 mg kg^{−1} (oral, rat)

Related compounds
Related alkanoic acids	Octopine
Related compounds	1,2-Dimethylhydrazine; Biurea; Bis-tris propane
- Except where otherwise noted, data are given for materials in their standard state (at 25 °C [77 °F], 100 kPa). verify (what is ?) Infobox references

Daminozide, also known as aminozide, Alar, Kylar, SADH, B-995, B-nine, and DMASA, is an organic compound that acts as a plant growth regulator. It was produced in the U.S. by the Uniroyal Chemical Company, Inc., (now integrated into the Chemtura Corporation), which registered daminozide for use on fruits intended for human consumption in 1963. It was primarily used on apples until 1989, when the manufacturer voluntarily withdrew it after the U.S. Environmental Protection Agency proposed banning it based on concerns about cancer risks to consumers. In addition to apples and ornamental plants, Uniroyal also registered daminozide for use on cherries, peaches, pears, Concord grapes, tomato transplants, and peanut vines.

When used on fruit trees, daminozide affects flower bud initiation, fruit maturity, fruit firmness and coloring, preharvest drop and market quality of fruit at time of harvest and during storage. When consumed by mammals, daminozide is catabolised into succinic acid (a non-toxic general intermediate in primary metabolism) and 1,1-dimethylhydrazine (UDMH, a compound with a history of studies associating it with carcinogenic activity in animal models relevant to humans). Breakdown into these two compounds also occurs when the sprayed chemical residue remains on stored fruit, especially with higher temperatures and over longer time periods.

In 1989, the EPA outlawed daminozide on U.S. food crops, but still allowed it for non-food crops like ornamental plants. As of August 2022, daminozide appeared as severely restricted in its exports on the list of pesticides whose shipments were ineligible for export credit insurance under the Export–Import Bank of the United States.

== Chemistry ==
While the U.S. Environmental Protection Agency (EPA) classed daminozide as an amino acid derivative in 1984, it is actually a product of the condensation of succinic anhydride with unsymmetrical dimethylhydrazine (UDMH), and therefore better classified as either a dicarboxylic acid or hydrazine:

$\ce{H2N-N(CH3)2 + (CH2CO)2O -> (CH3)2N-NHC(O)CH2CH2COOH}$

In its pure form, it is an off-white, water-soluble crystalline solid.

Known metabolites of daminozide include its precursor, UDMH. Daminozide exhibits very high soil mobility, alongside its soil metabolite, methanol, though the latter is low risk and not persistent.

== Modes of action ==
Daminozide is classified as a plant growth regulator, a chemical sprayed on fruit to regulate their growth. It is absorbed through the leaves of plants, where it is thought to inhibit 2OG oxygenases, which are involved in the biosynthesis of gibberellin and ethylene. These hormones regulate, among other processes, fruit senescence (ripening).

When used on fruit trees, it affects flower bud initiation, fruit maturity, fruit firmness and coloring, and preharvest drop, which together make harvest easier and keep fruit from falling off the trees before they ripen; it also improves quality of fruit at time of harvest and during storage.

=== Carcinogenicity of daminozide degradation products ===
When daminozide residue on fruit is consumed by mammalian species, it is catabolised into two chemical components, succinic acid (a non-toxic general intermediate in primary metabolism), and 1, 1-dimethylhydrazine ("unsymmetrical dimethylhydrazine", UDMH). Degradation into these products also occurs when the sprayed chemical residue remains on stored fruit, increasing with time and elevated temperature. UDMH has had a history of studies associating it with carcinogenic activity in animal models relevant to humans, beginning in the 1960s.

== U.S. campaign to ban Alar ==
In 1985, the EPA studied daminozide's effects on mice and hamsters, concluding that it was a "probable human carcinogen" with a dietary risk possibly as high as one cancer for every thousand people exposed, and proposed banning its use on food crops. They submitted the proposal to the Scientific Advisory Panel (SAP), which concluded that the tests were inadequate to determine the carcinogenicity of the tested substances.

Later, in May 1989, Democrats Joseph Lieberman (D-CT) and Harry Reid (D-NV) held a press conference in which the pesticide program at the FDA was accused of being "riddled with pro-industry bias", charging that 7 of 8 SAP members had worked as "consultants for the 'chemical industry'" — that the worst of them, after serving on the SAP (see below), had "later broke[n] conflict-of-interest laws", with career university academic toxicologists Wendell Kilgore and Christopher Wilkinson (29 years, UCal-Davis and 22 years, Cornell) being singled out as "possible violators of the [FDA] ethics code", with invitation to the "EP[A] inspector general [IG] to investigate". Marshall Elliot, writing for the News & Views section of the AAAS publication, Science, noted that these Senators' public scolding of SAP members—which was prompted by the FDA's "waffling on Alar"—led to the investigation of just these two academics by that agency's IG, and of forwarding of Kilgore's file to the U.S. Justice Department for review. Marshall further noted that the event was being seen, in the months following, more for its forcing clarification of rules regarding

how much the government [can limit its]... more than 100,000 advisors, including scientists... who deal with issues ranging from biomedicine to arms control... [quotes spliced to clarify advisor roles] involvement with industry without isolating itself from the expertise it seeks,

than for unearthing formal wrongdoing in the Alar case (wherein, after reversal of an earlier, similar conviction on appeal, no charges were ultimately brought). In particular, the Senators alleged that Kilgore had a financial connection to Uniroyal, with Wilkinson and the other five being accused of having more general financial ties to the chemical industry; notably, the key formal contention was of possible violation of FDA ethics rules regarding limits to the "kind of consulting jobs that can be accepted after leaving an advisory panel" [emphasis in original source].

The next year, the EPA retracted its proposed ban on Alar and required farmers to reduce its use by 50%. The American Academy of Pediatrics urged EPA to ban daminozide, and some manufacturers and supermarket chains announced they would not accept Alar-treated apples.

In a 1989 NYT opinion by Natural Resources Defense Council (NRDC) trustee John B. Oakes, regarding a two-year NRDC study peer-reviewed by an independent panel, Oakes presented the report's argument that children ingesting daminozide in legally permissible quantities were at "intolerable risk" (from it and a wide variety of other potentially harmful chemicals); by their estimate, Oakes said, the "average pre-schooler's exposure to this carcinogen... result[s] in a cancer risk '240 times greater than the cancer risk considered acceptable by E.P.A. following a full lifetime of exposure.'" In February, 1989, the CBS television program 60 Minutes broadcast a story about Alar that featured the NRDC report highlighting problems with the chemical.

In June 1989, Uniroyal, Alar's sole manufacturer, agreed to halt voluntarily all domestic sales of Alar for food uses. Hence, the consequences of CBS broadcast were swift and severe; as Percival, Schroeder, Miller, and Leape note in review of legal aspects in their Environmental Regulation text,

"The denouement... came quickly. Alar was removed from the apple market by its manufacturer, not because of regulatory requirements imposed by the EPA, but because of consumer pressure"

In 1992, the U.S. Environmental Protection Agency (EPA) decided to ban Alar on the grounds that "long-term exposure" posed "unacceptable risks to public health."

In particular, the "rapid decline in apple consumption that followed the "60 Minutes" report" As the Chicago Tribune noted at that time, Alar's export was not prohibited, such that Uniroyal could continue its sales in about 70 countries, which led critics to note that Americans still faced exposure (via imported fruit and juice). However, as of August 2022, daminozide/alar was appearing as a "severely restricted" entry on the List of Banned and Severely Restricted Pesticides Under the Prior Informed Consent (PIC) Program of the Export-Import Bank of the United States, making its shipments ineligible for export credit insurance.

=== Backlash ===
In November 1990, Washington apple growers filed a lawsuit in Yakima County Superior Court against CBS, NRDC and Fenton Communications (hired by NRDC to publicize their report on Alar) claiming that unfair business practices (product disparagement in particular) cost them $100 million. The suit was moved from state to federal court at the request of CBS. U.S. District Judge William Fremming Nielsen ruled in 1993 that the apple growers had not proved their case, and it was subsequently dismissed by the United States Court of Appeals for the Ninth Circuit.

Elizabeth Whelan and her organization, the American Council on Science and Health (ACSH), which had received $25,000 from Alar's manufacturer, stated that Alar and its breakdown product UDMH had not been shown to be carcinogenic. During a 1990 speech at Hillsdale College, Whelan said that groups like the NRDC were ignoring a basic principle of toxicology: the dose makes the poison. "It is an egregious departure from science and logic when a substance is labeled 'cancer-causing' based on a response in a single animal study using high doses of a test material", she said.

== Current views ==
Taken together, the complexity of the problem of assigning risk to this agent—the debate over assumptions concerning risks from early-in-life exposure, the principal role of a decomposition product rather than the agent itself in determining its long-term toxicity, the generation of that product both abiotically and through metabolism after consumption, as well as challenges in determining appropriate "subpopulations for study, representative parameters of the potency distribution, and corrections for bioassay length"—have had as a consequence that disagreement and controversy remain about the safety of daminozide and the appropriateness of responses to it in its history.

Consumers Union did its own analyses and estimated that the human lifetime cancer risk was 5 cases per million, as compared to the previously reported figure of 50 per million. (The EPA had argued for a level of lifetime cancer risk of 1 per million to be the highest acceptable, in this type of case.) On the other hand, representatives of the California Department of Health Services are on record as of 1991 stating that "the plausible estimates of risk, derived from conservative, reasonable assumptions, exceed those developed by EPA and NRDC". As late as 1995, results continued to appear (e.g., from a medium-term carcinogenicity assay approved for use by the ICH)—supporting insignificant levels of "carcinogenicity of daminozide, alone or in combination with... 1,1-dimethylhydrazine".

As of 2005, daminozide remained classified as a probable human carcinogen by the EPA, and listed as a known carcinogen under California's Prop 65.
