= N-(long-chain-acyl)ethanolamine deacylase =

Identifiers
- EC no.: 3.5.1.60
- CAS no.: 99283-61-1

Databases
- IntEnz: IntEnz view
- BRENDA: BRENDA entry
- ExPASy: NiceZyme view
- KEGG: KEGG entry
- MetaCyc: metabolic pathway
- PRIAM: profile
- PDB structures: RCSB PDB PDBe PDBsum
- Gene Ontology: AmiGO / QuickGO
Search
- PMC: articles
- PubMed: articles
- NCBI: proteins

In enzymology, a N-(long-chain-acyl)ethanolamine deacylase (EC 3.5.1.60) is an enzyme that catalyzes the chemical reaction

N-(long-chain-acyl)ethanolamine + H_{2}O $\rightleftharpoons$ a long-chain carboxylate + ethanolamine

Thus, the two substrates of this enzyme are N-(long-chain-acyl)ethanolamine and H_{2}O, whereas its two products are long-chain carboxylate and ethanolamine.

This enzyme belongs to the family of hydrolases, those acting on carbon-nitrogen bonds other than peptide bonds, specifically in linear amides. The systematic name of this enzyme class is N-(long-chain-acyl)ethanolamine amidohydrolase. Other names in common use include N-acylethanolamine amidohydrolase, and acylethanolamine amidase.
