= MDEA =

MDEA may refer to:

- Methyl diethanolamine (N-methyl-diethanolamine), CH_{3}N(C_{2}H_{4}OH)_{2}, a chemical used for amine gas treating, also known as gas sweetening or acid gas removal, the removal of hydrogen sulfide and carbon dioxide from gasses in the petrochemical industry
- Methylenedioxyethylamphetamine (3,4-methylenedioxy-N-ethylamphetamine), C_{12}H_{17}NO_{2}, an analog of the drug MDMA
