= Ethyl acrylate =

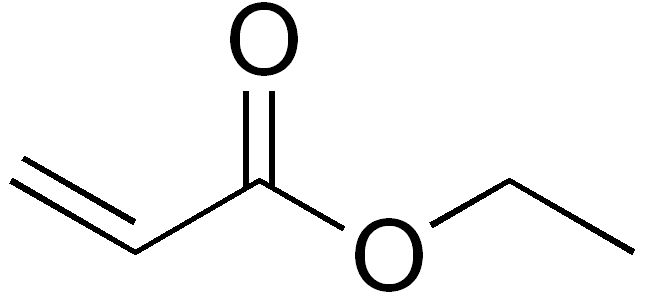

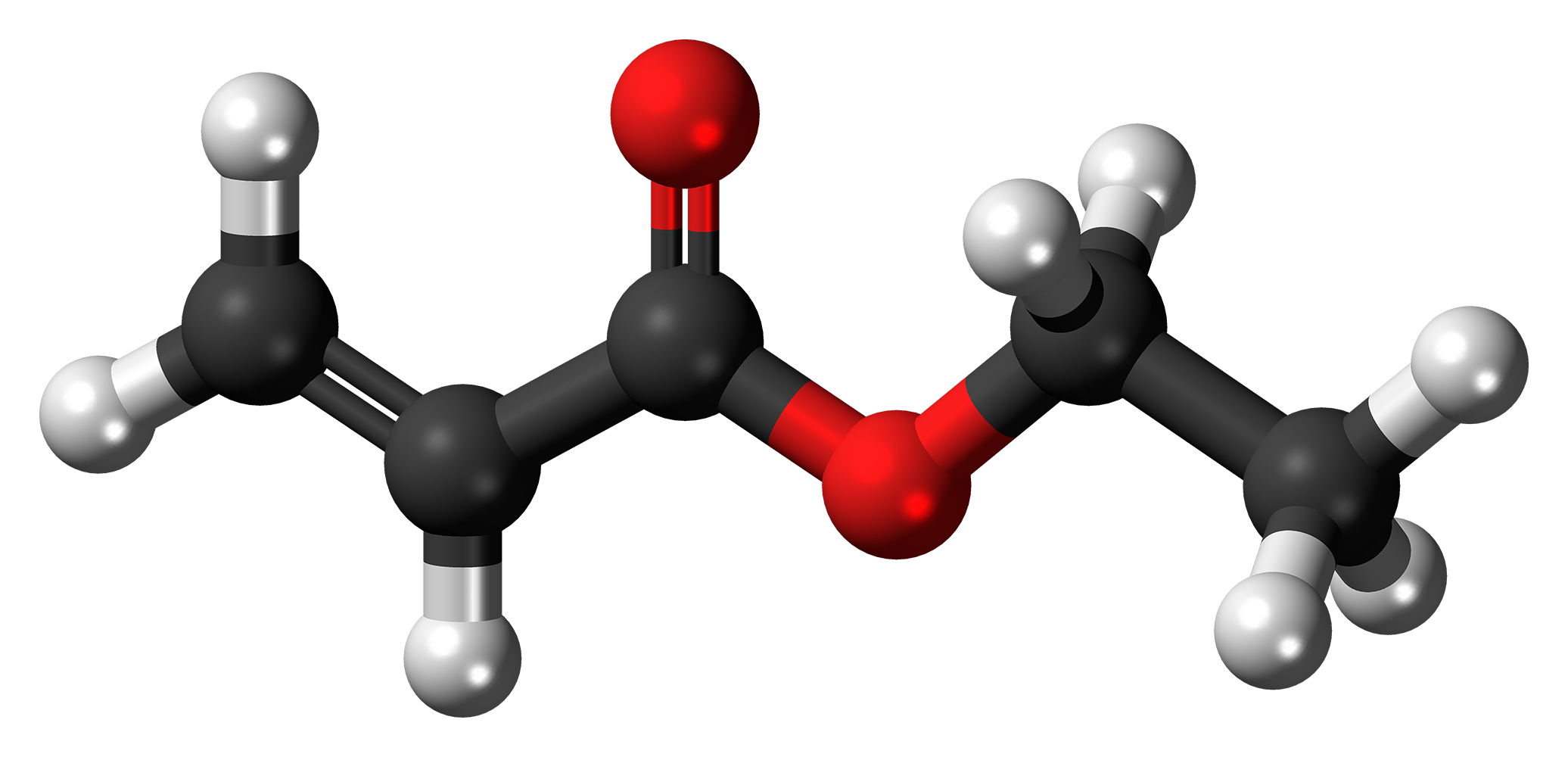

Names
- Preferred IUPAC name Ethyl prop-2-enoate
- Other names Ethyl propenoate Ethyl acrylate Acrylic acid ethyl ester Ethyl ester of acrylic acid

Identifiers
CAS Number	140-88-5
3D model (JSmol)	Interactive image
ChEBI	CHEBI:82327
ChEMBL	ChEMBL52084
ChemSpider	8490
ECHA InfoCard	100.004.945
EC Number	205-438-8
KEGG	C19238
PubChem CID	8821
RTECS number	AT0700000
UNII	71E6178C9T
UN number	1917
CompTox Dashboard (EPA)	DTXSID4020583
- InChI: InChI=1S/C5H8O2/c1-3-5(6)7-4-2/h3H,1,4H2,2H3 Key: JIGUQPWFLRLWPJ-UHFFFAOYSA-N; InChI=1/C5H8O2/c1-3-5(6)7-4-2/h3H,1,4H2,2H3 Key: JIGUQPWFLRLWPJ-UHFFFAOYAN
- SMILES: CCOC(=O)C=C

Properties
Chemical formula	C_{5}H_{8}O_{2}
Molar mass	100.117 g·mol^{−1}
Appearance	Colorless liquid
Odor	Acrid
Density	0.9405 g/mL
Melting point	−71 °C (−96 °F; 202 K)
Boiling point	99.4 °C (210.9 °F; 372.5 K)
Solubility in water	1.5 g/100 mL
Solubility	organic solvents
Vapor pressure	29 mmHg (20°C)

Hazards
- Occupational safety and health (OHS/OSH)
Main hazards	Carcinogenic
- GHS labelling
Pictograms	(GHS02: Flammable) (GHS07: Exclamation mark)
Signal word	Danger
Hazard statements	H225, H302, H312, H315, H317, H319, H332, H335
Precautionary statements	P210, P233, P240, P241, P242, P243, P261, P264, P270, P271, P272, P280, P301+P312, P302+P352, P303+P361+P353, P304+P312, P304+P340, P305+P351+P338, P312, P321, P322, P330, P332+P313, P333+P313, P337+P313, P362, P363, P370+P378, P403+P233, P403+P235, P405, P501
NFPA 704 (fire diamond)	2 3 2
Flash point	15 °C (59 °F; 288 K)
Explosive limits	1.4%-14%
- Lethal dose or concentration (LD, LC)
LC_{50} (median concentration)	2180 ppm (rat, 4 hr); 3894 ppm (mouse)
LC_{Lo} (lowest published)	1204 ppm (rabbit, 7 hr); 1204 ppm (guinea pig, 7 hr)
- NIOSH (US health exposure limits)
PEL (Permissible)	TWA 25 ppm (100 mg/m^{3}) [skin]
REL (Recommended)	Carcinogen
IDLH (Immediate danger)	Ca [300 ppm]
- Except where otherwise noted, data are given for materials in their standard state (at 25 °C [77 °F], 100 kPa). verify (what is ?) Infobox references

Ethyl acrylate is an organic compound with the formula CH_{2}CHCO_{2}CH_{2}CH_{3}. It is the ethyl ester of acrylic acid. It is a colourless liquid with a characteristic acrid odor. It is mainly produced for paints, textiles, and non-woven fibers. It is also a reagent in the synthesis of various pharmaceutical intermediates.

== Production ==
Ethyl acrylate is produced by acid-catalysed esterification of acrylic acid, which in turn is produced by oxidation of propylene. It may also be prepared from acetylene, carbon monoxide and ethanol by a Reppe reaction. Commercial preparations contain a polymerization inhibitor such as hydroquinone, phenothiazine, or hydroquinone ethyl ether.

Dow Inc., BASF and Arkema are the two largest producers of Ethyl Acrylate in the United States.

== Reactions and uses ==
=== Precursor to polymers and other monomers ===
Ethyl acrylate is used in the production of polymers including resins, plastics, rubber, and denture material.

Ethyl acrylate is a reactant for homologous alkyl acrylates (acrylic esters) by transesterification with higher alcohols through acidic or basic catalysis. In that way speciality acrylates are made accessible, e.g. 2-ethylhexyl acrylate (from 2-ethylhexanol) used for pressure-sensitive adhesives, cyclohexyl acrylate (from cyclohexanol) used for automotive clear lacquers, 2-hydroxyethyl acrylate (from ethylene glycol) which is crosslinkable with diisocyanates to form gels used with long-chain acrylates (from C18+ alcohols) as comonomer for comb polymers for reduction of the solidification point of paraffin oils and 2-dimethylaminoethyl acrylate (from dimethylaminoethanol) for the preparation of flocculants for sewage clarification and paper production.

As a reactive monomer, ethyl acrylate is used in homopolymers and copolymers with e.g. ethene, acrylic acid and its salts, amides and esters, methacrylates, acrylonitrile, maleic esters, vinyl acetate, vinyl chloride, vinylidene chloride, styrene, butadiene and unsaturated polyesters. Copolymers of acrylic acid ethyl ester with ethene (EPA/ethylene-ethyl acrylate copolymers) are suitable as adhesives and polymer additives, just like ethene vinyl acetate copolymers. Copolymers with acrylic acid increase the cleaning effect of liquid detergents, copolymers with methacrylic acid are used as gastric juices tablet covers (Eudragit).

The large number of possible comonomer units and their combination in copolymers and terpolymers with ethyl acrylate allows the realization of different properties of the acrylate copolymers in a variety of applications in paints and adhesives, paper, textile and leather auxiliaries together with cosmetic and pharmaceutical products.

=== As Michael acceptor and HX acceptor ===
Ethyl acrylate reacts with amines catalyzed by Lewis acids in a Michael addition to β-alanine derivatives in high yields:

The nucleophilic addition at ethyl acrylate as an α,β-unsaturated carbonyl compound is a frequent strategy in the synthesis of pharmaceutical intermediates. Examples are the hypnotic glutethimide or the vasodilator vincamin (obsolete by now) or more recent therapeutics such as the COPD agent cilomilast or the nootropic leteprinim.

Ethyl 3-bromopropionate is prepared by hydrobromination of ethyl acrylate.

=== Dienophile ===
With dienes, ethyl acrylate reacts as a good dienophile in Diels–Alder reactions e.g. with buta-1,3-diene in a [4+2] cycloaddition reaction to give a cyclohexene carboxylic acid ester in a high yield.

== Natural occurrence ==
Ethyl acrylate is also used as a flavoring agent. It has been found as a volatile component in pineapples and Beaufort cheese and is a secondary component in vanilla flavor obtained from heat extraction of vanilla in amounts of up to 1 ppm. In such high concentrations it negatively affects the extracted aroma.

== Safety ==
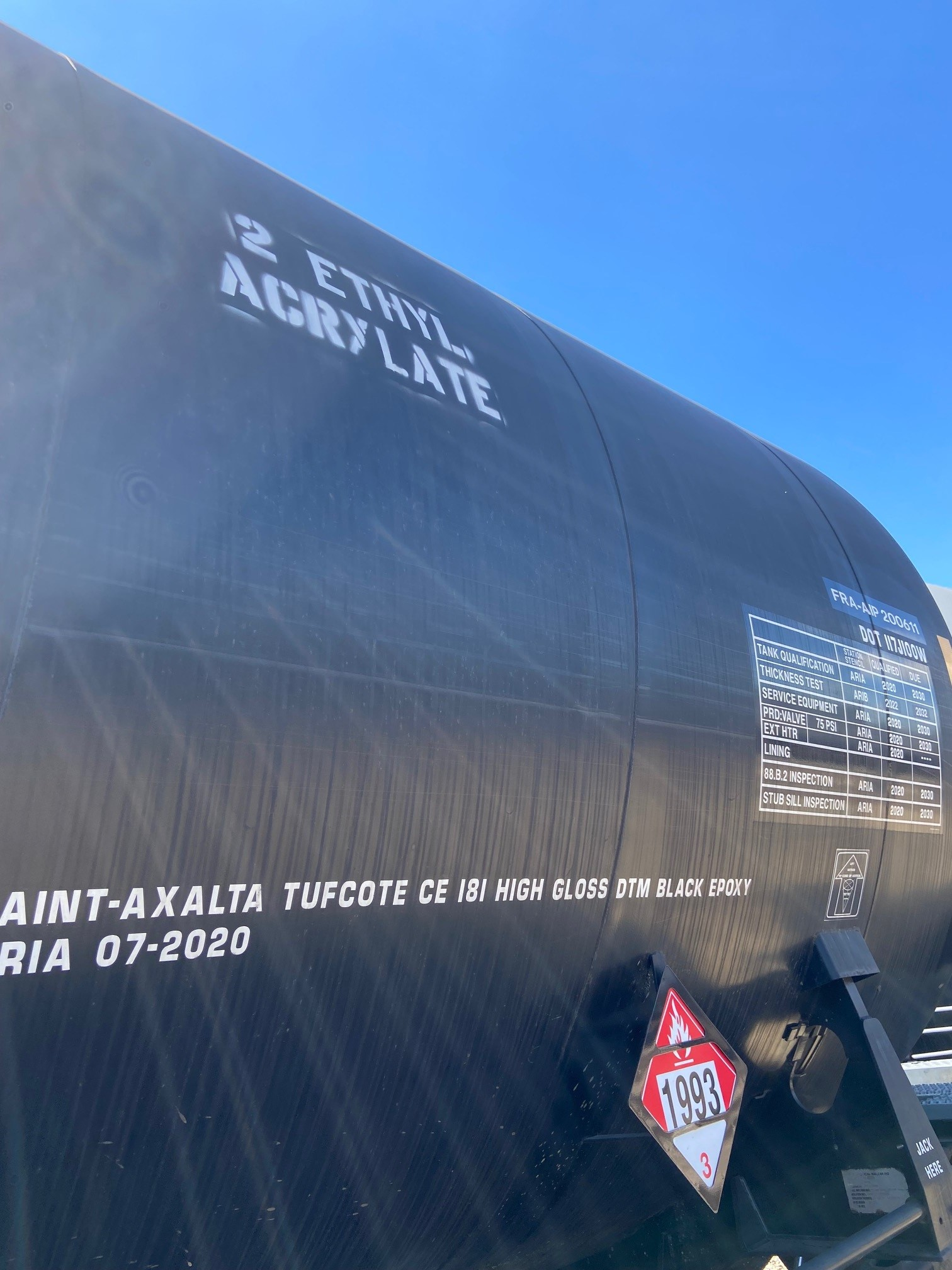
A railway tank car carrying ethyl acrylate, displaying hazardous materials information including a diamond-shaped U.S. DOT placard showing a UN number

The International Agency for Research on Cancer stated, "Overall evaluation, ethyl acrylate is possibly carcinogenic to humans (Group 2B)." The United States Environmental Protection Agency (EPA) states, "Human studies on occupational exposure to ethyl acrylate... have suggested a relationship between exposure to the chemical(s) and colorectal cancer, but the evidence is conflicting and inconclusive. In a study by the National Toxicology Program (NTP), increased incidence of squamous cell papillomas and carcinomas of the forestomach were observed in rats and mice exposed via gavage (experimentally placing the chemical in the stomach). However, the NTP recently determined that these data were not relevant to human carcinogenicity since humans do not have a forestomach, and removed ethyl acrylate from its list of carcinogens." However, ethyl acrylate also increased the incidence of thyroid follicular cell adenoma in male mice, and thyroid follicular cell adenoma or carcinoma (combined) in male rats exposed through inhalation.

It is possibly carcinogenic and it is toxic in large doses, with an LD_{50} (rats, oral) of 1020 mg/kg. As of October 2018, the FDA withdrew authorization for its use as a synthetic flavoring substance in food.

One favorable safety aspect is that ethyl acrylate has good warning properties; the odor threshold is much lower than the concentration required to create an atmosphere immediately dangerous to life and health. Reports of the exact levels vary somewhat, but, for example, the EPA reports an odor threshold of 0.0012 parts per million (ppm), but the EPA's lowest level of health concern, the Acute Exposure Guideline Level-1 (AEGL-1) is 8.3 ppm, which is almost 7000 times the odor threshold.

However, as a possible carcinogen, NIOSH maintains "that there is no safe level of exposure to a carcinogen. Reduction of worker exposure to chemical carcinogens as much as possible through elimination or substitution and engineering controls is the primary way to prevent occupational cancer."
