= Diethanolamide =

Class of chemical compounds

General structure of diethanolamides.

Diethanolamides are common ingredients used in cosmetics to act as a foaming agents or as emulsifiers. Chemically, they are amides formed from diethanolamine and carboxylic acids, typically fatty acids.

Examples include:

- Cocamide diethanolamine
- Lauramide diethanolamine
- Oleamide diethanolamine
