= N-Methyl-2-thiazolidinethione =

Names
- Preferred IUPAC name 3-Methyl-1,3-thiazolidine-2-thione
- Other names MTT, MTT 80, N-Methyl-2-thiazolidinethione

Identifiers
CAS Number	1908-87-8
3D model (JSmol)	Interactive image
ChemSpider	67276
ECHA InfoCard	100.016.014
EC Number	217-614-1
PubChem CID	74703
UNII	LIX65700J1
CompTox Dashboard (EPA)	DTXSID0062054
- InChI: InChI=1S/C4H7NS2/c1-5-2-3-7-4(5)6/h2-3H2,1H3 Key: RGTLAJIDOSPEDH-UHFFFAOYSA-N
- SMILES: CN1CCSC1=S

Properties
Chemical formula	C_{4}H_{7}NS_{2}
Molar mass	133.23 g·mol^{−1}
Appearance	White solid
Melting point	68–69 °C (154–156 °F; 341–342 K)

Hazards
- GHS labelling
Pictograms	(GHS07: Exclamation mark)
Signal word	Warning
Hazard statements	H302
Precautionary statements	P264, P270, P301+P312, P330, P501
- Except where otherwise noted, data are given for materials in their standard state (at 25 °C [77 °F], 100 kPa). Infobox references

N-Methyl-2-thiazolidinethione is the organosulfur compound with the formula C_{2}H_{4}S(NCH_{3})CS. It is classified as a heterocycle called a thiazolidine. It is a colorless or off-white solid. It has gained attention as a proposed low toxicity replacement for ethylenethioureas, which are used as accelerators for the vulcanization of chloroprene rubbers. The compound is prepared by reaction of N-methylethanolamine and carbon disulfide.

== See also ==
- Mercaptobenzothiazole - a structurally similar, but aromatic, vulcanization accelerator
