= Bis-tris methane =

- Skeletal formula of bis-tris methane

Names
- Preferred IUPAC name 2-[Bis(2-hydroxyethyl)amino]-2-(hydroxymethyl)propane-1,3-diol
- Other names: Bis-(2-hydroxy-ethyl)-amino-tris(hydroxymethyl)-methane; 2-[Bis(2-hydroxyethyl)amino]-2-(hydroxymethyl)-1,3-propanediol; 2,2-Bis(hydroxymethyl)-2,2,2-nitrilotriethanol

Identifiers
CAS Number	6976-37-0
3D model (JSmol)	Interactive image
Beilstein Reference	2205275
ChEBI	CHEBI:41250
ChemSpider	73505
ECHA InfoCard	100.027.489
EC Number	230-237-7
Gmelin Reference	4519
MeSH	Bistris
PubChem CID	81462
UNII	Q1XC3631CP
CompTox Dashboard (EPA)	DTXSID6064537
- InChI: InChI=1S/C8H19NO5/c10-3-1-9(2-4-11)8(5-12,6-13)7-14/h10-14H,1-7H2 Key: OWMVSZAMULFTJU-UHFFFAOYSA-N
- SMILES: OCCN(CCO)C(CO)(CO)CO

Properties
Chemical formula	C_{8}H_{19}NO_{5}
Molar mass	209.242 g·mol^{−1}
Appearance	White crystals
Odor	Odourless
Melting point	102 to 103 °C (216 to 217 °F; 375 to 376 K)
Solubility in water	209.2 g L^{−1} (at 20 °C)
Acidity (pK_{a})	6.46
Basicity (pK_{b})	7.54
UV-vis (λ_{max})	280 nm
Absorbance	0.15

Hazards
- GHS labelling
Pictograms	(GHS07: Exclamation mark)
Signal word	Warning
Hazard statements	H315, H319, H335
Precautionary statements	P261, P305+P351+P338
NFPA 704 (fire diamond)	2 0 0

Related compounds
Related alkanols	N-Methylethanolamine; Dimethylethanolamine; Diethylethanolamine; Diethanolamine; N,N-Diisopropylaminoethanol; Methyl diethanolamine; Triethanolamine; Meglumine
Related compounds	Diethylhydroxylamine
- Except where otherwise noted, data are given for materials in their standard state (at 25 °C [77 °F], 100 kPa). verify (what is ?) Infobox references

Bis-tris methane, also known as BIS-TRIS or BTM, is a buffering agent used in biochemistry. Bis-tris methane is an organic tertiary amine with labile protons having a pKa of 6.46 at 25 °C. It is an effective buffer between the pH 5.8 and 7.2. Bis-tris methane binds strongly to Cu and Pb ions as well as, weakly, to Mg, Ca, Mn, Co, Ni, Zn and Cd.

== See also ==
- Bis-tris propane
- Tris
- Tricine
