= Methyldiethanolamine =

- Skeletal formula of methyl diethanolamine

Names
- Preferred IUPAC name 2,2′-(Methylazanediyl)di(ethan-1-ol)
- Other names Bis(2-hydroxyethyl)(methyl)amine

Identifiers
CAS Number	105-59-9
3D model (JSmol)	Interactive image
Beilstein Reference	1734441
ChEMBL	ChEMBL3185149
ChemSpider	7479
ECHA InfoCard	100.003.012
EC Number	203-312-7
MeSH	N-methyldiethanolamine
PubChem CID	7767
RTECS number	KL7525000
UNII	3IG3K131QJ
CompTox Dashboard (EPA)	DTXSID8025591
- InChI: InChI=1S/C5H13NO2/c1-6(2-4-7)3-5-8/h7-8H,2-5H2,1H3 Key: CRVGTESFCCXCTH-UHFFFAOYSA-N
- SMILES: CN(CCO)CCO

Properties
Chemical formula	C_{5}H_{13}NO_{2}
Molar mass	119.164 g·mol^{−1}
Appearance	Colorless liquid
Odor	Ammoniacal
Density	1.038 g mL^{−1}
Melting point	−21.00 °C; −5.80 °F; 252.15 K
Boiling point	247.1 °C; 476.7 °F; 520.2 K
Solubility in water	Miscible
Vapor pressure	1 Pa (at 20 °C)
Refractive index (n_{D})	1.4694
Viscosity	101 mPa s (at 20°C)

Pharmacology
Routes of administration	Oral

Hazards
- GHS labelling
Pictograms	(GHS07: Exclamation mark)
Signal word	Warning
Hazard statements	H319
Precautionary statements	P305+P351+P338
NFPA 704 (fire diamond)	1 1 0
Flash point	127 °C (261 °F; 400 K)
Autoignition temperature	410 °C (770 °F; 683 K)
Explosive limits	1.4–8.8%
- Lethal dose or concentration (LD, LC)
LD_{50} (median dose)	1.945 g kg^{−1} (oral, rat)

Related compounds
Related alkanols	N-Methylethanolamine; Dimethylethanolamine; Diethylethanolamine; Diethanolamine; N,N-Diisopropylaminoethanol; Triethanolamine; Bis-tris methane
Related compounds	Diethylhydroxylamine
- Except where otherwise noted, data are given for materials in their standard state (at 25 °C [77 °F], 100 kPa). verify (what is ?) Infobox references

Methyldiethanolamine, also known as N-methyl diethanolamine and more commonly as MDEA, is the organic compound with the formula CH_{3}N(C_{2}H_{4}OH)_{2}. It is a colorless liquid with an ammonia odor. It is miscible with water, ethanol and benzene. A tertiary amine, it is widely used as a sweetening agent in chemical, oil refinery, syngas production and natural gas.

Similar compounds are monoethanolamine (MEA), a primary amine, and diethanolamine (DEA), a secondary amine, both of which are also used for amine gas treating. MDEA's defining characteristic when compared to these other amines is its ability to preferentially remove H_{2}S (and strip CO_{2}) from sour gas streams.

MDEA's popularity as a solvent for gas treating stems from several advantages it has when compared to other alkanolamines. One of these advantages is a low vapor pressure, which allows for high amine compositions without appreciable losses through the absorber and regenerator. MDEA is also resistant to thermal and chemical degradation and is largely immiscible with hydrocarbons. MDEA is a common base note in perfumes to allow the fragrance to last. Lastly, MDEA has a relatively low heat of reaction with hydrogen sulfide and carbon dioxide, which allows for lower reboiler duties, thus lower operating costs.

== MDEA blends ==
MDEA is less reactive towards CO_{2}, but has an equilibrium loading capacity approaching 1 mole CO_{2} per mole amine. It also requires less energy to regenerate. To combine the advantages of MDEA and the smaller amines, MDEA is usually mixed with a catalytic promoter such as piperazine, PZ, or a fast reacting amine such as MEA to retain reactivity, but lower regeneration costs. Activated MDEA or aMDEA uses piperazine as a catalyst to increase the speed of the reaction with CO_{2}. It has been commercially successful. Many tests have been done on the performance of MDEA/MEA or MDEA/piperazine mixtures compared to single amines. CO_{2} production rates were higher than MEA for the same heat duty and total molar concentration when experiments were performed in the University of Regina pilot plant, which is a modeled after a natural gas plant. There were also insignificant trace amounts of degradation products detected. However, when the same control variables and tests were conducted at the Boundary Dam Power Station plant, the CO_{2} production rate for the mixed solvent was lower than MEA. This was a result of the reduction in the capacity of the solvent to absorb CO_{2} after degradation. Because the Boundary Dam plant is a coal-fired power plant, it operates under harsher environments and produces an impure flue gas containing, fly ash, SO_{2}, and NO_{2} that are fed into carbon capture. Even with flue gas pretreatment, there is still enough to produce degradation products such as straight chain amines and sulfur compounds, which accumulate so it is no longer possible to regenerate MEA and MDEA. For these blends to be successful in reducing heat duty, their chemical stabilities must be maintained.

=== Degradation ===
Main oxidative degradation products of MDEA include monoethanol amine (MEA), methyl-aminoethanol (MAE), diethanolamine (DEA), amino acids bicine, glycine and hydroxyethyl sarcosine (HES), formyl amides of MAE and DEA, ammonia, and stable salts formate, glycolate, acetate, and oxalate. In an industrial plan that utilizes MDEA, oxidative degradation is most likely to shift to the cross exchanger where temperatures are greater than 70 °C. Higher temperatures and higher CO_{2} loading accelerate the rate of degradation, resulting in an increase of alkalinity loss as well as total formate production. While MDEA is more resistant to degradation as a standalone compared to MEA, MDEA is preferentially degraded when in an MDEA/MEA blend. Because of the formation of DEA and MAE, which could form nitroso-compounds or diethylnitrosamine and diethylnitraine, the blend could potentially have an adverse impact in terms of atmospheric admissions. In the Boundary Dam plant, emissions increased when CO_{2} loading of lean amine increased for the blend and MEA. However, decreasing the lean loading increases the reboiler heat duty, which results in an obvious tradeoff between emissions and heat duty or energy costs.

This compound should not be confused with the recreational drug methylenedioxyethylamphetamine which is also abbreviated MDEA.

== Production ==
MDEA is produced by ethoxylation of methylamine using ethylene oxide:

CH_{3}NH_{2} + 2 C_{2}H_{4}O → CH_{3}N(C_{2}H_{4}OH)_{2}

Another route involves hydroxymethylation of diethanolamine followed by hydrogenolysis.

== See also ==
- Amine gas treating
