= Diethylhydroxylamine =

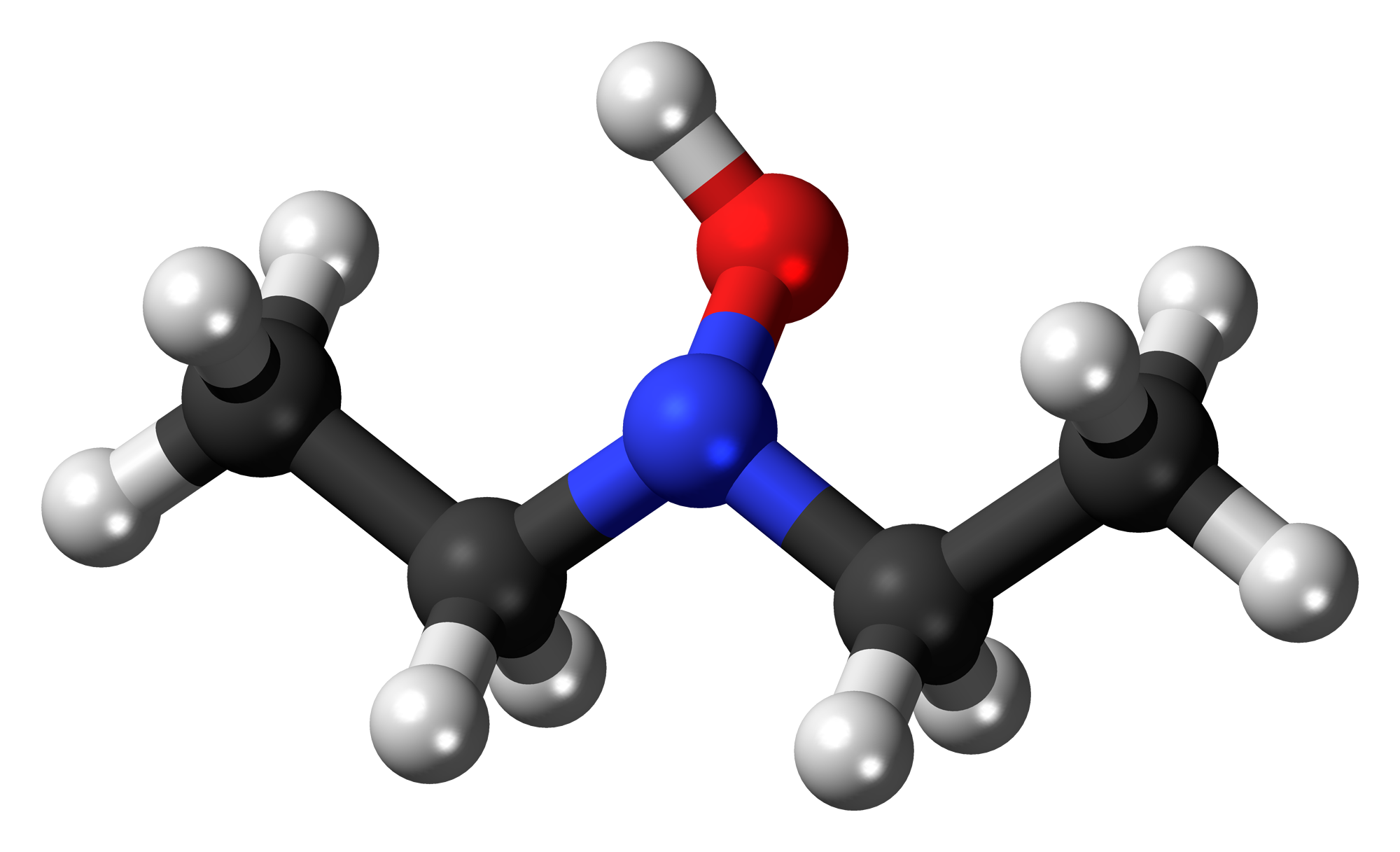

Names
- Preferred IUPAC name N-Ethyl-N-hydroxyethanamine

Identifiers
CAS Number	3710-84-7
3D model (JSmol)	Interactive image
Beilstein Reference	1731349
ChemSpider	18340
ECHA InfoCard	100.020.960
EC Number	223-055-4
MeSH	N,N-diethylhydroxylamine
PubChem CID	19463
RTECS number	NC3500000
UNII	314I05EDVH
UN number	1993
CompTox Dashboard (EPA)	DTXSID2027543
- InChI: InChI=1S/C4H11NO/c1-3-5(6)4-2/h6H,3-4H2,1-2H3 Key: FVCOIAYSJZGECG-UHFFFAOYSA-N
- SMILES: CCN(O)CC

Properties
Chemical formula	C_{4}H_{11}NO
Molar mass	89.138 g·mol^{−1}
Appearance	Colorless liquid
Odor	Ammoniacal
Density	867 mg mL^{−1}
Melting point	−26 to −25 °C (−15 to −13 °F; 247 to 248 K)
Boiling point	127.6 °C; 261.6 °F; 400.7 K
Solubility in water	Miscible
Vapor pressure	500 Pa (at 0 °C)
Acidity (pK_{a})	5.67 (est)

Thermochemistry
Heat capacity (C)	370.8 J K^{−1} mol^{−1}
Std enthalpy of formation (Δ_{f}H^{⦵}_{298})	−175.47–−174.03 kJ mol^{−1}
Std enthalpy of combustion (Δ_{c}H^{⦵}_{298})	−2.97201–−2.97069 MJ mol^{−1}

Hazards
- GHS labelling
Pictograms	(GHS02: Flammable) (GHS07: Exclamation mark)
Signal word	Warning
Hazard statements	H226, H312, H315, H319, H332
Precautionary statements	P280, P305+P351+P338
Explosive limits	1.9–10%
- Lethal dose or concentration (LD, LC)
LD_{50} (median dose)	1.3 g kg^{−1} (dermal, rabbit); 2.19 g kg^{−1} (oral, rat)

Related compounds
Related alkanols	N-Methylethanolamine; Dimethylethanolamine; Diethylethanolamine; Diethanolamine; N,N-Diisopropylaminoethanol; Methyl diethanolamine; Triethanolamine; Bis-tris methane; Meglumine
- Except where otherwise noted, data are given for materials in their standard state (at 25 °C [77 °F], 100 kPa). verify (what is ?) Infobox references

Diethylhydroxylamine (DEHA) is an organic compound with the formula (C_{2}H_{5})_{2}NOH. Strictly, this is N,N-diethylhydroxylamine. It has an isomer, N,O-diethylhydroxylamine with the formula EtNHOEt. Pure N,N-diethylhydroxylamine is a colorless liquid, although it is usually encountered as a colourless-to-yellow solution in water with an amine-like odor.

DEHA can be synthesised from a reaction between triethylamine and a peroxide.

== Applications ==
DEHA is largely used as an oxygen scavenger in water treatment.

It is a volatile oxygen scavenger and reacts in a ratio of 2.8/1 DEHA/O2. It is employed in high pressure (>70 bar) boiler systems due to a very low rate of reaction at low temperatures and pressures. Due to its volatility, it acts as an oxygen scavenger throughout the entire boiler system due to steam carryover.

DEHA also reacts with ferrous metals to form a passivized film of magnetite throughout the boiler system. The reduction of toxic heavy metals, such as hexavalent chromium to their more environmentally-friendly counterparts like trivalent chromium, is also performed using aqueous solutions containing DEHA.

Several other applications include its use as:

1. Polymerisation inhibitor
2. Color stabilizer (photographics)
3. Corrosion inhibitor
4. Discoloration inhibitor (phenolics)
5. Antiozonant
6. Radical scavenger
