= Triethanolamine =

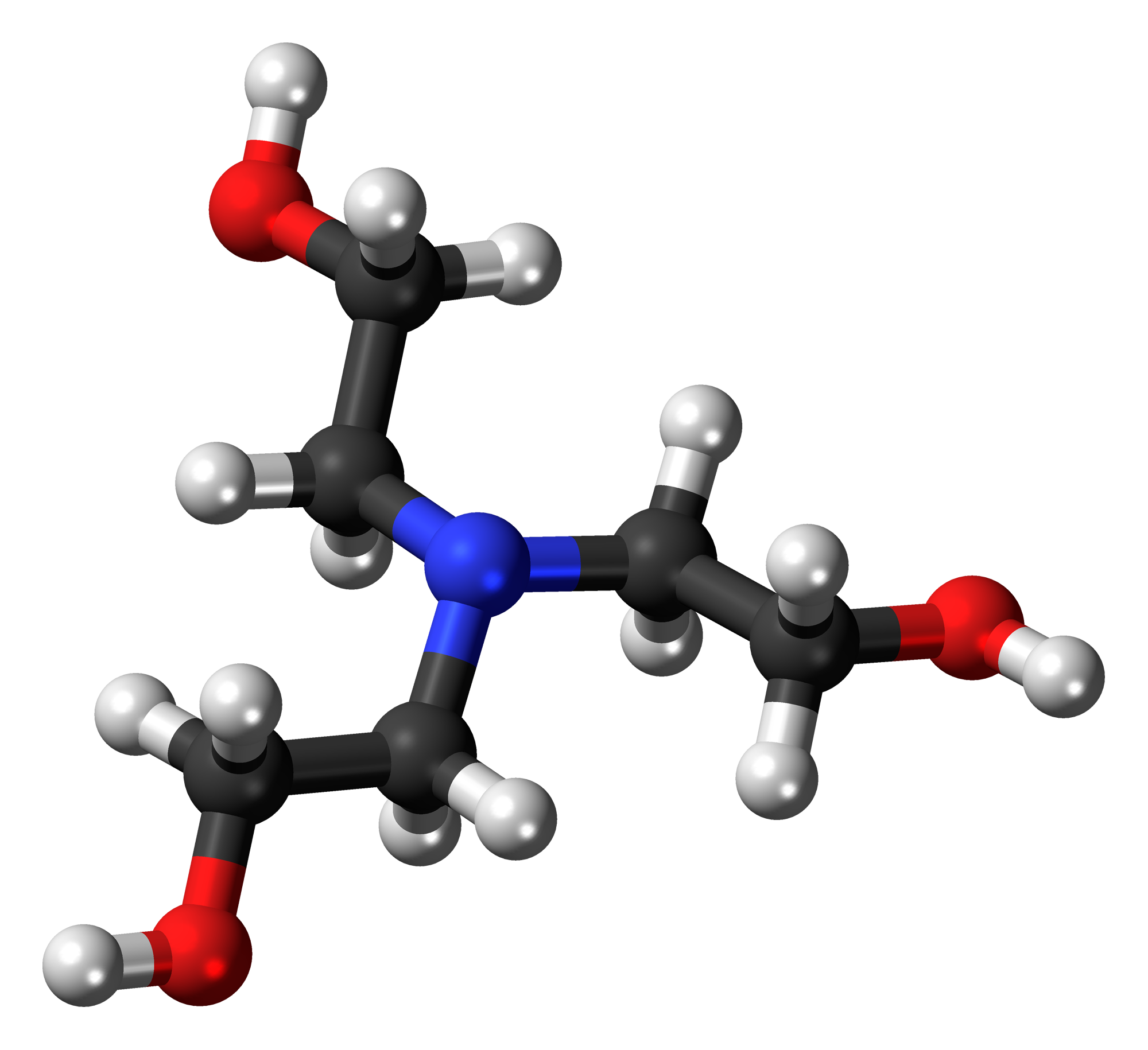

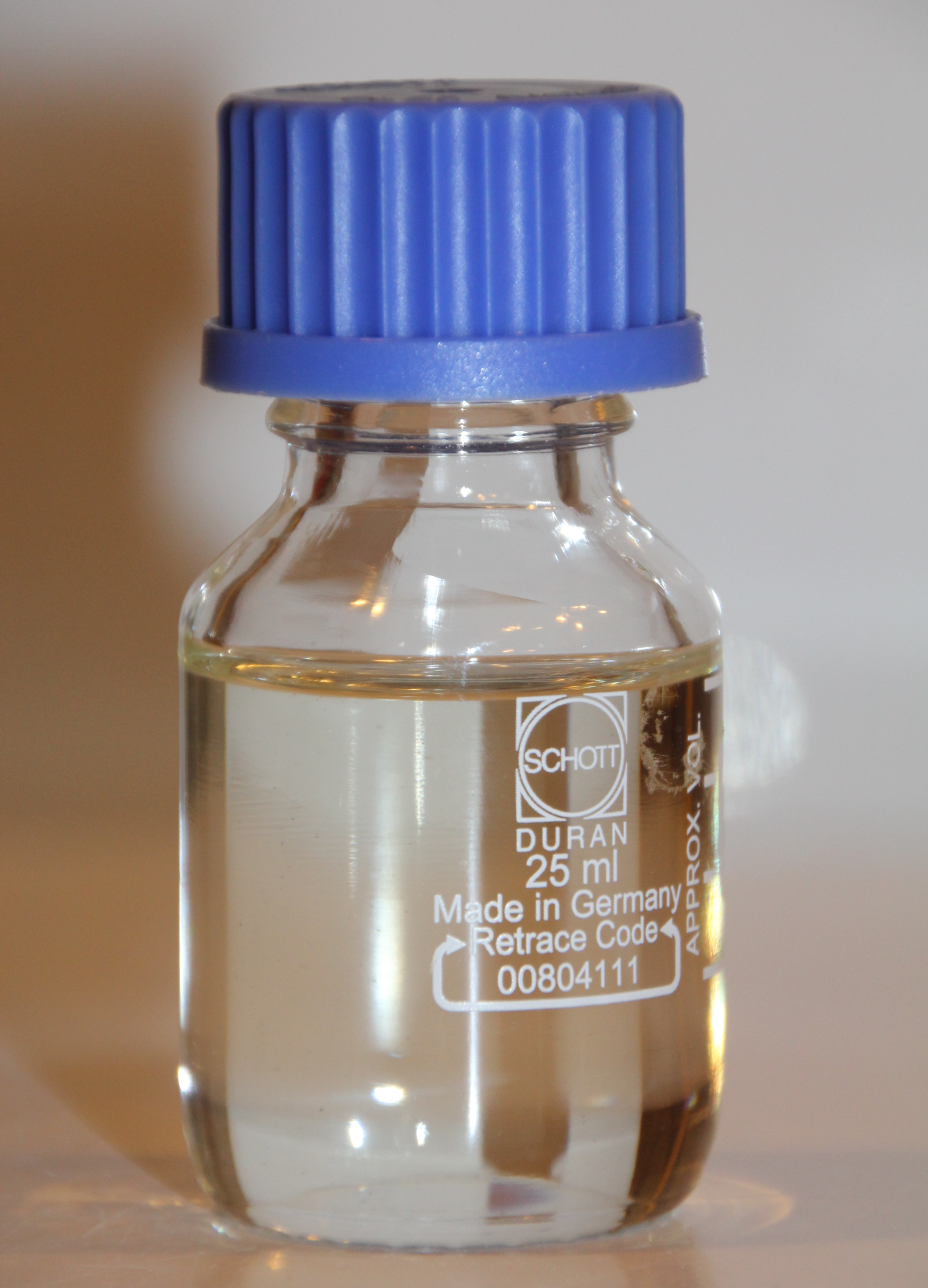
- Liquid form

Names
- Preferred IUPAC name 2,2′,2′′-Nitrilotri(ethan-1-ol)
- Other names: 2,2′,2′′-Nitrilotriethanol; Tris(2-hydroxyethyl)amine; Triethylolamine; 2,2′,2′′-Trihydroxytriethylamine; Trolamine; TEA; TELA; TEOA

Identifiers
CAS Number	102-71-6
3D model (JSmol)	Interactive image
Beilstein Reference	1699263
ChEBI	CHEBI:28621
ChEMBL	ChEMBL446061
ChemSpider	13835630
ECHA InfoCard	100.002.773
EC Number	203-049-8
KEGG	D00215
MeSH	Biafine
PubChem CID	7618
RTECS number	KL9275000
UNII	9O3K93S3TK
CompTox Dashboard (EPA)	DTXSID9021392
- InChI: InChI=1S/C6H15NO3/c8-4-1-7(2-5-9)3-6-10/h8-10H,1-6H2 Key: GSEJCLTVZPLZKY-UHFFFAOYSA-N
- SMILES: OCCN(CCO)CCO

Properties
Chemical formula	N(CH_{2}CH_{2}OH)_{3}
Molar mass	149.190 g·mol^{−1}
Appearance	Colourless, viscous liquid
Odor	Ammoniacal
Density	1.124 g/mL
Melting point	21.60 °C; 70.88 °F; 294.75 K
Boiling point	335.40 °C; 635.72 °F; 608.55 K
Solubility in water	miscible
log P	−0.988
Vapor pressure	1 Pa (at 20 °C)
Acidity (pK_{a})	7.74
UV-vis (λ_{max})	280 nm
Refractive index (n_{D})	1.485

Thermochemistry
Heat capacity (C)	389 J K^{−1} mol^{−1}
Std enthalpy of formation (Δ_{f}H^{⦵}_{298})	−665.7 – −662.7 kJ mol^{−1}
Std enthalpy of combustion (Δ_{c}H^{⦵}_{298})	−3.8421 – −3.8391 MJ mol^{−1}

Pharmacology
ATC code	D03AX12 (WHO)

Hazards
- GHS labelling
Pictograms	(GHS07: Exclamation mark)
Signal word	Warning
Hazard statements	H319
Precautionary statements	P305+P351+P338
NFPA 704 (fire diamond)	2 1 0
Flash point	179 °C (354 °F; 452 K)
Autoignition temperature	325 °C (617 °F; 598 K)
Explosive limits	1.3–8.5%
- Lethal dose or concentration (LD, LC)
LD_{50} (median dose)	2.2 g/kg (oral, guinea pig); 2.2 g/kg (oral, rabbit); 5.53 g/kg (oral, rat); 5.846 g/kg (oral, mouse); 22.5 g/kg (dermal, rabbit)
Safety data sheet (SDS)	hazard.com (archived copy from original)

Related compounds
Related alkanols	N-Methylethanolamine; Dimethylethanolamine; Diethylethanolamine; Ethanolamine; Diethanolamine; N,N-Diisopropylaminoethanol; Methyl diethanolamine; Bis-tris methane
Related compounds	Diethylhydroxylamine
- Except where otherwise noted, data are given for materials in their standard state (at 25 °C [77 °F], 100 kPa). verify (what is ?) Infobox references

Triethanolamine (TEOA) is an organic compound with the chemical formula N(CH_{2}CH_{2}OH)_{3}. It is a colourless, viscous liquid. It is both a tertiary amine and a triol. A triol is a molecule with three alcohol groups. Approximately 150,000 tonnes were produced in 1999. It is a colourless compound although samples may appear yellow because of impurities.

== Production ==
Triethanolamine is produced from the reaction of ethylene oxide with aqueous ammonia, also produced are ethanolamine and diethanolamine. The ratio of the products can be controlled by changing the stoichiometry of the reactants.

== Applications ==
Triethanolamine is used primarily in making surfactants, such as for emulsifiers. It is a common ingredient in formulations used for both industrial and consumer products. The triethanolamine neutralizes fatty acids, adjusts and buffers the pH, and solubilizes oils and other ingredients that are not completely soluble in water. Triethanolammonium salts in some cases are more soluble than salts of alkali metals that might be used otherwise, and results in less alkaline products than would from using alkali metal hydroxides to form the salt. Some common products in which triethanolamine is found are sunscreen lotions, liquid laundry detergents, dishwashing liquids, general cleaners, hand sanitizers, polishes, metalworking fluids, paints, shaving cream and printing inks.

=== Cement production ===
Triethanolamine is also used as organic additive (0.1 wt%) in the grinding of cement clinker. It facilitates the grinding process by preventing agglomeration and coating of the powder at the surface of balls and mill wall.

=== Cosmetics and medicine ===
Various ear diseases and infections are treated with eardrops containing triethanolamine polypeptide oleate-condensate, such as Cerumenex in the United States. In pharmaceutics, triethanolamine is the active ingredient of some eardrops used to treat impacted earwax. It also serves as a pH balancer in many different cosmetic products, ranging from cleansing creams and milks, skin lotions, eye gels, moisturizers, shampoos, shaving foams, TEOA is a fairly strong base: a 1% solution has a pH of approximately 10, whereas the pH of skin is less than pH 7, approximately 5.5−6.0. Cleansing milk–cream emulsions based on TEOA are particularly good at removing makeup.

=== Derivatives ===
1. Amustaline
2. Trolnitrate
3. Trimustine

=== In the laboratory and in amateur photography ===
Another common use of TEOA is as a complexing agent for aluminium ions in aqueous solutions. This reaction is often used to mask such ions before complexometric titrations with another chelating agent such as EDTA. TEOA has also been used in photographic (silver halide) processing. It has been promoted as a useful alkali by amateur photographers.

=== In holography ===
TEOA is used to provide a sensitivity boost to silver-halide-based holograms, and also as a swelling agent to color shift holograms. It is possible to get the sensitivity boost without color shift by rinsing out the TEOA before squeegee and drying.

=== In electroless plating ===
TEOA is now commonly and very effectively used as a complexing agent in electroless deposition.

=== In ultrasonic testing ===
2-3% in water TEOA is used as an corrosion inhibitor (anti-rust) agent in immersion ultrasonic testing.

=== In aluminium soldering ===
Triethanolamine, diethanolamine and aminoethylethanolamine are major components of common liquid organic fluxes for the soldering of aluminium alloys using tin-zinc and other tin or lead-based soft solders.

== Safety and regulation ==
=== Allergic reactions ===
A 1996 study found that triethanolamine (TEOA) occasionally causes contact allergy. A 2001 study found TEOA in a sunscreen caused an allergic contact dermatitis. A 2007 study found TEOA in ear drops caused a contact allergy. Systemic and respiratory tract (RT) toxicity was analyzed for 28 days in a nose specific inhalation 2008 study in Wistar rats; TEOA seems to be less potent in regard to systemic toxicity and RT irritancy than diethanolamine (DEA). Exposure to TEOA resulted in focal inflammation, starting in single male animals from 20 mg/m^{3} concentrations.

A 2009 study stated that patch test reactions reveal a slight irritant potential instead of a true allergic response in several cases, and also indicated the risk of skin sensitization to TEOA seems to be very low.

=== Tumors ===
Reports indicated that TEOA causes an increased incidence of tumor growth in the liver in female B6C3F1 mice, but not in male mice or in Fischer 344 rats, although higher-primates are known to have higher resistance to the tumorigenesis. A 2004 study concluded "TEOA may cause liver tumors in mice via a choline-depletion mode of action and that this effect is likely caused by the inhibition of choline uptake by cells."

=== Environmental toxicity ===
A 2009 study found that TEOA has potential acute, sub-chronic and chronic toxicity properties in respect to aquatic species.

=== Regulation ===
TEOA is listed under Schedule 3, part B of the Chemical Weapons Convention as it can be used in the manufacture of HN3 nitrogen mustard.

== See also ==
- Complexometric titration
- Ethanolamine
- Ethanol
- Triethanolamine salicylate
