= Diethanolamine =

- Skeletal formula

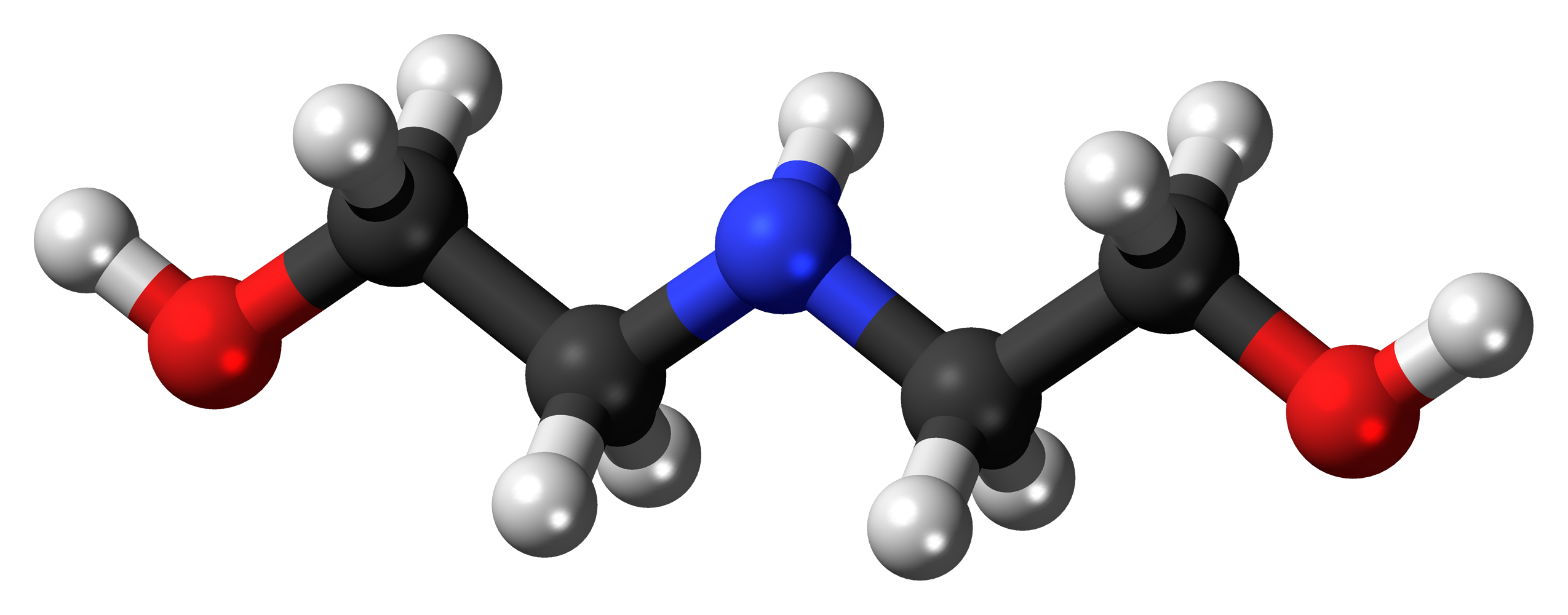
- Ball and stick diagram

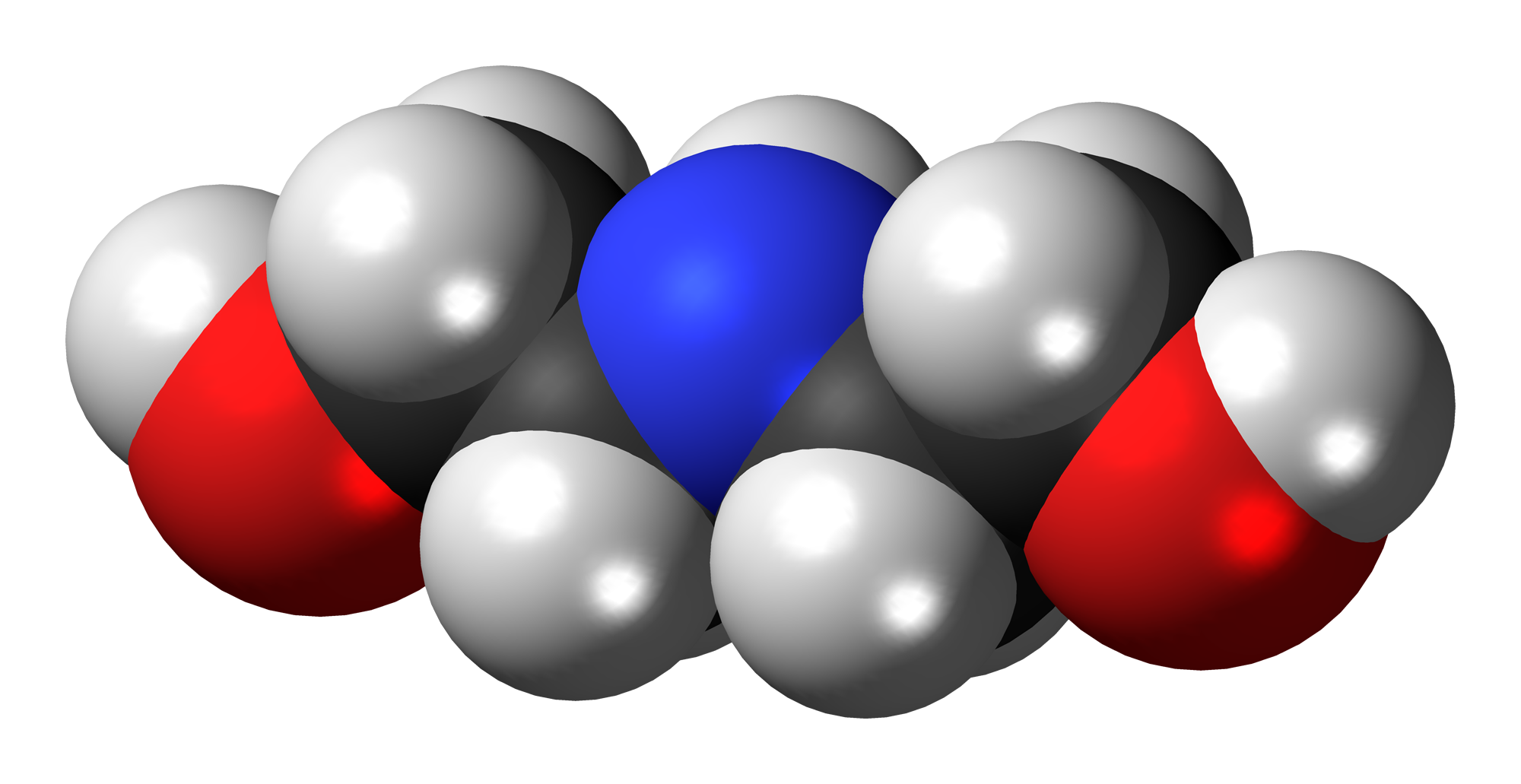
Spacefill model

Names
- Preferred IUPAC name 2,2′-Azanediyldi(ethan-1-ol)
- Other names: Bis(hydroxyethyl)amine; N,N-Bis(2-hydroxyethyl)amine; 2,2'-Dihydroxydiethylamine; β,β'-Dihydroxydiethylamine; Diolamine; 2-[(2-Hydroxyethyl)amino]ethanol; 2,2'-Iminobisethanol; Iminodiethanol; Di(2-hydroxyethyl)amine; bis(2-Hydroxyethyl)amine; 2,2'-Iminodiethanol

Identifiers
CAS Number	111-42-2
3D model (JSmol)	Interactive image
Beilstein Reference	605315
ChEBI	CHEBI:28123
ChEMBL	ChEMBL119604
ChemSpider	13835604
ECHA InfoCard	100.003.517
EC Number	203-868-0
KEGG	D02337
MeSH	diethanolamine
PubChem CID	8113
RTECS number	KL2975000
UNII	AZE05TDV2V
CompTox Dashboard (EPA)	DTXSID3021932
- InChI: InChI=1S/C4H11NO2/c6-3-1-5-2-4-7/h5-7H,1-4H2 Key: ZBCBWPMODOFKDW-UHFFFAOYSA-N
- SMILES: OCCNCCO

Properties
Chemical formula	C_{4}H_{11}NO_{2}
Molar mass	105.137 g·mol^{−1}
Appearance	Colourless crystals
Odor	Ammonia odor
Density	1.097 g·mL^{−1}
Melting point	28.00 °C; 82.40 °F; 301.15 K
Boiling point	271.1 °C; 519.9 °F; 544.2 K
Solubility in water	Miscible
log P	−1.761
Vapor pressure	<1 Pa (at 20 °C)
UV-vis (λ_{max})	260 nm
Refractive index (n_{D})	1.477

Thermochemistry
Heat capacity (C)	137 J·K^{−1}·mol^{−1}
Std enthalpy of formation (Δ_{f}H^{⦵}_{298})	−496.4 – −491.2 kJ·mol^{−1}
Std enthalpy of combustion (Δ_{c}H^{⦵}_{298})	−26.548 – −26.498 MJ·kmol^{−1}

Hazards
- GHS labelling
Pictograms	(GHS05: Corrosive) (GHS07: Exclamation mark) (GHS08: Health hazard)
Signal word	Danger
Hazard statements	H302, H315, H318, H373
Precautionary statements	P280, P305+P351+P338
Flash point	138 °C (280 °F; 411 K)
Autoignition temperature	365 °C (689 °F; 638 K)
Explosive limits	1.6–9.8%
- Lethal dose or concentration (LD, LC)
LD_{50} (median dose)	120 mg·kg^{−1} (intraperitoneal, rat); 710 mg·kg^{−1} (oral, rat); 778 mg·kg^{−1} (intravaneous, rat); 12.2 g·kg^{−1} (dermal, rabbit)
- NIOSH (US health exposure limits)
PEL (Permissible)	None
REL (Recommended)	TWA: 3 ppm (15 mg/m^{3})
IDLH (Immediate danger)	N.D.
Safety data sheet (SDS)	sciencelab.com

Related compounds
Related alkanols	N-Methylethanolamine; Dimethylethanolamine; Diethylethanolamine; N,N-Diisopropylaminoethanol; Methyl diethanolamine; Ethanolamine; Triethanolamine; Bis-tris methane; Meglumine
Related compounds	Diethylhydroxylamine
- Except where otherwise noted, data are given for materials in their standard state (at 25 °C [77 °F], 100 kPa). verify (what is ?) Infobox references

Diethanolamine, often abbreviated as DEA or DEOA, is an organic compound with the formula HN(CH_{2}CH_{2}OH)_{2}. Pure diethanolamine is a white solid at room temperature, but its tendencies to absorb water and to supercool often results in it being found in a colorless, viscous liquid state. Diethanolamine is polyfunctional, being a secondary amine and a diol. Like other organic amines, diethanolamine acts as a weak base. Reflecting the hydrophilic character of the secondary amine and hydroxyl groups, DEA is soluble in water. Amides prepared from DEA are often also hydrophilic. In 2013, the chemical was classified by the International Agency for Research on Cancer as "possibly carcinogenic to humans" (Group 2B).

== Production ==
The reaction of ethylene oxide with aqueous ammonia first produces ethanolamine:

C_{2}H_{4}O + NH_{3} → H_{2}NCH_{2}CH_{2}OH

which reacts with a second and third equivalent of ethylene oxide to give DEA and triethanolamine:

C_{2}H_{4}O + H_{2}NCH_{2}CH_{2}OH → HN(CH_{2}CH_{2}OH)_{2}
C_{2}H_{4}O + HN(CH_{2}CH_{2}OH)_{2} → N(CH_{2}CH_{2}OH)_{3}

About 300M kg are produced annually in this way. The ratio of the products can be controlled by changing the stoichiometry of the reactants.

== Uses ==
DEA is used as a surfactant and a corrosion inhibitor. It is used to remove hydrogen sulfide and carbon dioxide from natural gas.

Diethanolamine is widely used in the preparation of diethanolamides and diethanolamine salts of long-chain fatty acids that are formulated into soaps and surfactants used in liquid laundry and dishwashing detergents, cosmetics, shampoos and hair conditioners. In oil refineries, a DEA in water solution is commonly used to remove hydrogen sulfide from sour gas. It has an advantage over a similar amine, ethanolamine, in that a higher concentration may be used for the same corrosion potential. This allows refiners to scrub hydrogen sulfide at a lower circulating amine rate with less overall energy usage.

DEA is a chemical feedstock used in the production of morpholine.

Amides derived from DEA and fatty acids, known as diethanolamides, are amphiphilic.

The reaction of 2-chloro-4,5-diphenyloxazole with DEA gave rise to ditazole. The reaction of DEA and isobutyraldehyde with water removed produces an oxazolidine.

== Commonly used ingredients that may contain DEA ==
DEA is used in the production of diethanolamides, which are common ingredients in cosmetics and shampoos added to confer a creamy texture and foaming action. Consequently, some cosmetics that include diethanolamides as ingredients contain DEA. Some of the most commonly used diethanolamides include:

- Cocamide DEA
- DEA-Cetyl Phosphate
- DEA Oleth-3 Phosphate
- Lauramide DEA
- Myristamide DEA
- Oleamide DEA

== Safety and environment ==
DEA is a potential skin irritant in workers sensitized by exposure to water-based metalworking fluids.

DEA has potential toxicity properties for aquatic species.

DEA is a key component of unusual phospholipids that are produced by Morganella morganii, a bacteria in the human microbiome, with elevated levels being linked to increased incidence of major depression.
