= N-Methylethanolamine =

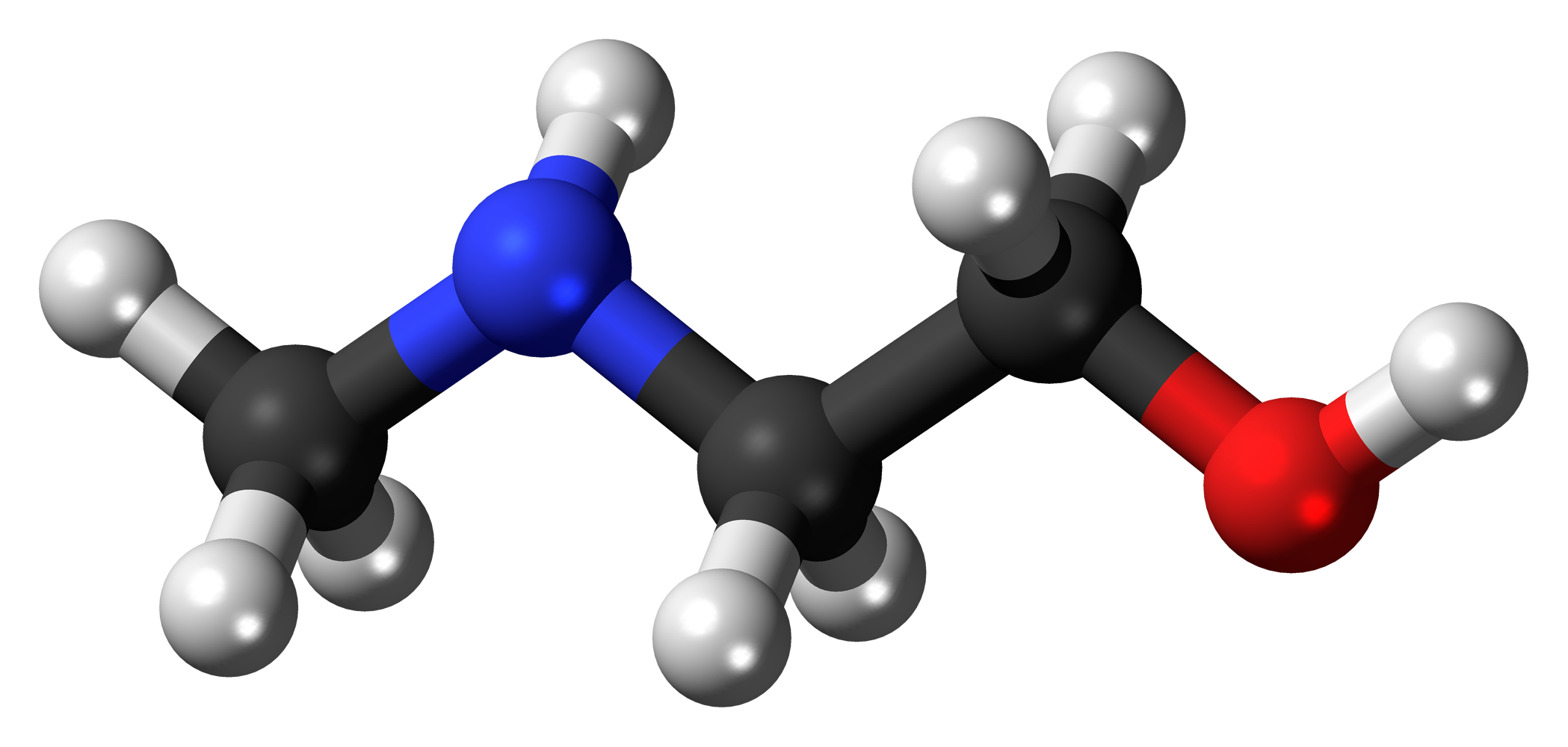

Names
- Preferred IUPAC name 2-(Methylamino)ethan-1-ol
- Other names: Methyl β-hydroxyethylamine; 2-Methylaminoethanol

Identifiers
| CAS Number | 109-83-1 |
| 3D model (JSmol) | Interactive image |
| Beilstein Reference | 1071196 |
| ChEBI | CHEBI:21763 |
| ChEMBL | ChEMBL104083 |
| ChemSpider | 13836021 |
| ECHA InfoCard | 100.003.374 |
| EC Number | 203-710-0 |
| MeSH | N-methylaminoethanol |
| PubChem CID | 8016 |
| RTECS number | KL6650000 |
| UNII | ZMQ4G4V497 |
| UN number | 2735 |
| CompTox Dashboard (EPA) | DTXSID5025603 |
- InChI: InChI=1S/C3H9NO/c1-4-2-3-5/h4-5H,2-3H2,1H3 Key: OPKOKAMJFNKNAS-UHFFFAOYSA-N
- SMILES: CNCCO

Properties
| Chemical formula | C_{3}H_{9}NO |
| Molar mass | 75.111 g·mol^{−1} |
| Appearance | Colourless liquid |
| Odor | Ammoniacal |
| Density | 0.935 g mL^{−1} |
| Melting point | −4.50 °C; 23.90 °F; 268.65 K |
| Boiling point | 158.1 °C; 316.5 °F; 431.2 K |
| Solubility in water | Miscible |
| log P | 1.062 |
| Vapor pressure | 70 Pa (at 20 °C) |
| Refractive index (n_{D}) | 1.439 |

Hazards
- GHS labelling
| Pictograms | (GHS05: Corrosive) (GHS07: Exclamation mark) |
| Signal word | Danger |
| Hazard statements | H302, H312, H314 |
| Precautionary statements | P280, P305+P351+P338, P310 |
| Flash point | 76 °C (169 °F; 349 K) |
| Autoignition temperature | 350 °C (662 °F; 623 K) |
| Explosive limits | 1.6–19.8% |

Related compounds
| Related alkanols | Dimethylethanolamine; Diethylethanolamine; Diethanolamine; N,N-Diisopropylaminoethanol; Methyl diethanolamine; Triethanolamine; Bis-tris methane |
| Related compounds | Diethylhydroxylamine |
- Except where otherwise noted, data are given for materials in their standard state (at 25 °C [77 °F], 100 kPa). verify (what is ?) Infobox references

N-Methylethanolamine is an alkanolamine with the formula CH_{3}NHCH_{2}CH_{2}OH. It is flammable, corrosive, colorless, viscous liquid. It is an intermediate in the biosynthesis of choline.

With both an amine and a hydroxyl functional groups, it is a useful intermediate in the chemical synthesis of various products including polymers and pharmaceuticals. It is also used as a solvent, for example in the processing of natural gas, where it is used together with its analogs ethanolamine and dimethylethanolamine.

== Production ==
N-Methylethanolamine is produced industrially by reacting ethylene oxide with excess methylamine in aqueous solution. This reaction yields a mixture of the 1:1 addition product NMEA (1) and - by a further addition of another ethylene oxide - the 1:2 addition product methyl diethanolamine (MDEA) (2):

In order to obtain high yields of the desired target product, the reactants are continuously fed to a flow reactor and reacted with a more than two-fold excess of methylamine. In the downstream process steps, the excess methylamine and the water is removed and NMEA (bp. 160 °C) and MDEA (bp. 243 °C) are isolated from the product mixture by fractional distillation. The poly(methyl-ethanolamine) formed by further addition of ethylene oxide to methylethanolamine remains in the distillation bottoms.

== Properties ==
N-Methylethanolamine is a clear, colorless, hygroscopic, amine-like smelling liquid which is miscible with water and ethanol in any ratio. Aqueous solutions react strongly basic and are therefore corrosive. The substance is easily biodegradable and has no potential of bioaccumulation due to its water miscibility. NMEA is not mutagenic, but in the presence of nitrite, carcinogenic nitrosamines can be formed from the compound, as it is a secondary amine.

== Use ==
Like other alkylalkanolamines, N-methylethanolamine is used in water- and solvent-based paints and coatings as a solubilizer for other components, such as pigments and as a stabilizer.

In cathodic dip-coating, N-methylaminoethanol serves as cation neutralizer for the partial neutralization of the epoxy resin. It also serves as a chain extender in the reaction of high molecular weight polyepoxides with polyols.

Being a base, N-methylaminoethanol forms neutral salts with fatty acids, which are used as surfactants (soaps) with good emulsifying properties and find applications in textile and personal care cleansing products. When bleaching cotton-polyester blends, NMEA is used as a brightener.

By methylation of N-methylaminoethanol, dimethylaminoethanol and choline [(2-hydroxyethyl)-trimethyl-ammonium chloride] can be prepared.

In the reaction of N-methylaminoethanol with fatty acids, long-chain N-methyl-N-(2-hydroxyethyl)amides are formed upon elimination of water. These are used as neutral surfactants. Such amides also act as flow improvers and pour point depressants in heavy oils and middle distillates. By catalytic oxidation of N-methylaminoethanol, the non-proteinogenic amino acid sarcosine is obtained.

N-methylaminoethanol plays a role as a building block for the synthesis of crop protection compounds and pharmaceuticals, such as in the first stage of the reaction sequence to the antihistamine and antidepressant mianserin (Tolvin) and to the non-analgesic Nefopam (Ajan).

In analogy to other aziridines, N-methylaziridine can be obtained by a Wenker synthesis from N-methylaminoethanol. This is done either via the sulfuric acid ester or after replacement of the hydroxy group by a chlorine atom (for example by thionyl chloride or chlorosulfuric acid) to N-methyl-2-chloroethylamine and then by using a strong base (cleavage of HCl) in an intramolecular nucleophilic substitution:

It reacts with carbon disulfide to give N-methyl-2-thiazolidinethione.

== See also ==
- Ethanolamine
- Dimethylethanolamine
