= Diethylethanolamine =

- Skeletal formula of diethylethanolamine

Names
- Preferred IUPAC name 2-(Diethylamino)ethan-1-ol
- Other names 2-(Diethylamino)ethanol; Diethylaminoethanol; 2-Diethylaminoethanol; N,N-Diethyl-2-aminoethanol; N,N-Diethylethanolamine; Diethyl(2-hydroxyethyl)amine (2-Hydroxyethyl)diethylamine; 2-Diethylaminoethyl alcohol 2-Hydroxytriethylamine

Identifiers
CAS Number	100-37-8
3D model (JSmol)	Interactive image
Beilstein Reference	741863
ChEBI	CHEBI:52153
ChEMBL	ChEMBL1183
ChemSpider	13842001
ECHA InfoCard	100.002.587
EC Number	202-845-2
MeSH	2-diethylaminoethanol
PubChem CID	7497
RTECS number	KK5075000
UNII	S6DL4M053U
UN number	2686
CompTox Dashboard (EPA)	DTXSID5021837
- InChI: InChI=1S/C6H15NO/c1-3-7(4-2)5-6-8/h8H,3-6H2,1-2H3 Key: BFSVOASYOCHEOV-UHFFFAOYSA-N
- SMILES: CCN(CC)CCO

Properties
Chemical formula	C_{6}H_{15}NO
Molar mass	117.192 g·mol^{−1}
Appearance	Colourless liquid
Odor	Ammoniacal and irritating
Density	884 mg mL^{−1}
Melting point	−70 °C; −94 °F; 203 K
Boiling point	161.1 °C; 321.9 °F; 434.2 K
Solubility in water	miscible
log P	0.769
Vapor pressure	100 Pa (at 20 °C)
Refractive index (n_{D})	1.441–1.442

Hazards
- GHS labelling
Pictograms	(GHS02: Flammable) (GHS05: Corrosive) (GHS07: Exclamation mark)
Signal word	Danger
Hazard statements	H226, H302, H312, H314, H317, H332
Precautionary statements	P280, P305+P351+P338, P310
Flash point	50 °C (122 °F; 323 K)
Explosive limits	1.4–11.7%
- Lethal dose or concentration (LD, LC)
LD_{50} (median dose)	1.113 g kg^{−1} (dermal, rabbit); 1.3 g kg^{−1} (oral, rat)
LC_{50} (median concentration)	924 ppm (rat, 4 hr); 1027 ppm (mouse)
- NIOSH (US health exposure limits)
PEL (Permissible)	TWA 10 ppm (50 mg/m^{3}) [skin]
REL (Recommended)	TWA 10 ppm (50 mg/m^{3}) [skin]
IDLH (Immediate danger)	100 ppm

Related compounds
Related alkanols	N-Methylethanolamine; Dimethylethanolamine; Diethanolamine; N,N-Diisopropylaminoethanol; Methyl diethanolamine; Triethanolamine; Bis-tris methane; Meglumine
Related compounds	Diethylhydroxylamine
- Except where otherwise noted, data are given for materials in their standard state (at 25 °C [77 °F], 100 kPa). Infobox references

Diethylethanolamine (DEAE) is the organic compound with the molecular formula (C_{2}H_{5})_{2}NCH_{2}CH_{2}OH. A colorless liquid, is used as a precursor in the production of a variety of chemical commodities such as the local anesthetic procaine.

== Applications ==
Diethylethanolamine is used as a corrosion inhibitor in steam and condensate lines by neutralizing carbonic acid and scavenging oxygen.

Diethylethanolamine reacts with 4-aminobenzoic acid to make procaine.

DEAE is a precursor for DEAE-cellulose resin, which is commonly used in ion exchange chromatography.

it can decrease the surface tension of water when the temperature is increased.

Solutions of DEAE absorb carbon dioxide (CO_{2}).

== Preparation ==
Diethylethanolamine is prepared commercially by the reaction of diethylamine and ethylene oxide.

(C_{2}H_{5})_{2}NH + cyclo(CH_{2}CH_{2})O → (C_{2}H_{5})_{2}NCH_{2}CH_{2}OH

It is also possible to prepare it by the nucleophilic substitution of diethylamine and 2-chloroethanol.

== Safety ==
Diethylethanolamine is an irritant to the eyes, skin, and lungs. The Occupational Safety and Health Administration and the National Institute for Occupational Safety and Health have set occupational exposure limits for workers handling the chemical at 10 ppm (50 mg/m^{3}) over an eight-hour workday.
