= Bis-tris propane =

- Skeletal formula of bis-tris propane

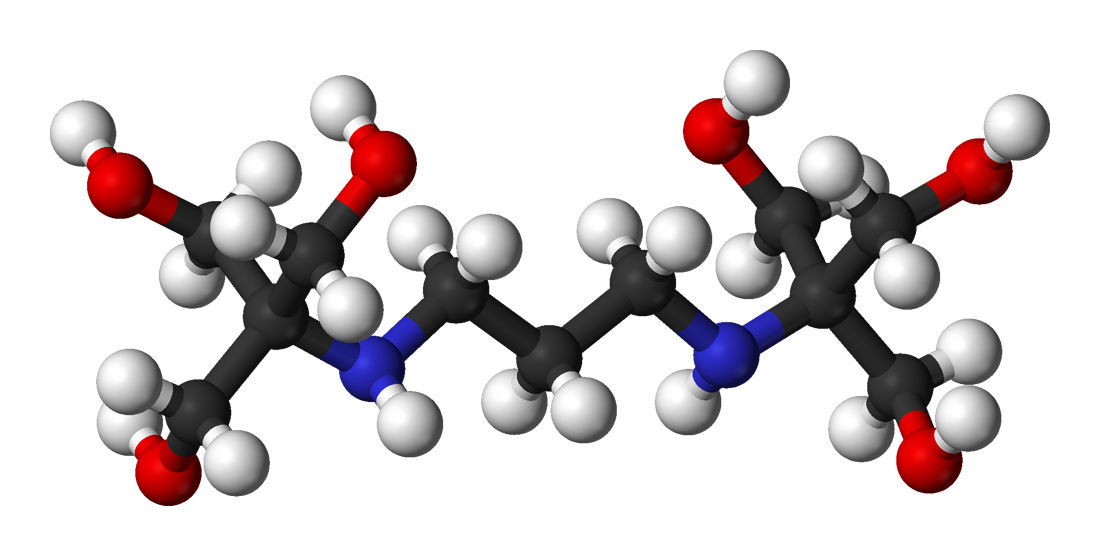
- Ball and stick model of bis-tris propane

Names
- Preferred IUPAC name 2,2′-[Propane-1,3-diylbis(azanediyl)]bis[2-(hydroxymethyl)propane-1,3-diol]
- Other names 2,2'-(Propane-1,3-diyldiimino)bis[2-(hydroxymethyl)propane-1,3-diol]

Identifiers
CAS Number	64431-96-5
3D model (JSmol)	Interactive image
Beilstein Reference	1786109
ChEBI	CHEBI:40947
ChEMBL	ChEMBL63859
ChemSpider	111383
DrugBank	DB02676
ECHA InfoCard	100.058.981
EC Number	264-899-3
Gmelin Reference	1734507
MeSH	1,3-bis(tris(hydroxymethyl)methylamino)propane
PubChem CID	125132
UNII	N5YD0CS4DO
CompTox Dashboard (EPA)	DTXSID30894116
- InChI: InChI=1S/C11H26N2O6/c14-4-10(5-15,6-16)12-2-1-3-13-11(7-17,8-18)9-19/h12-19H,1-9H2 Key: HHKZCCWKTZRCCL-UHFFFAOYSA-N
- SMILES: OCC(CO)(CO)NCCCNC(CO)(CO)CO

Properties
Chemical formula	C_{11}H_{26}N_{2}O_{6}
Molar mass	282.337 g·mol^{−1}
Appearance	White crystals
Melting point	164 to 165 °C (327 to 329 °F; 437 to 438 K)
log P	−2.794

Related compounds
Related compounds	Daminozide; Octopine; Nopaline; Pantetheine
- Except where otherwise noted, data are given for materials in their standard state (at 25 °C [77 °F], 100 kPa). verify (what is ?) Infobox references

Bis-tris propane, or 1,3-bis(tris(hydroxymethyl)methylamino)propane, also known as BTP, is a chemical substance that is used in buffer solutions. It is a white to off-white crystalline powder that is soluble in water. It has a wide buffering range, from 6 to 9.5 due to its two pK_{a} values which are close in value. This buffer is primarily used in biochemistry and molecular biology.

== Applications ==
A review of DNA polymerase fidelity cites bis-tris propane as a suitable buffer for polymerase chain reaction (PCR). Bis-Tris propane has also been used with HCl buffer for stabilization of farnesyl diphosphate isolated from a strain of Saccharomyces cerevisiae. It has also been used in a study of the effects of buffer identity on electric signals of light-excited bacteriorhodopsin. Use of Bis-Tris propane has also been documented in an investigation of the MgATPase activity of the myosin subfragment 1 monomer. The effect of buffer identity on the kinetics of the restriction enzyme EcoRV has been studied in various buffers, including Bis-Tris propane. Bis-Tris propane wide buffering range is also useful for calibration of genetically encoded pH indicators expressed in the cytosol or mitochondria. Bis-Tris propane has been used as the buffering agent in separation of full and empty capsids of recombinant adeno-associated virus vectors with anion-exchange chromatography.

== See also ==
- Bis-tris methane
- Tris
- Tricine
