= 2-oxoglutarate dioxygenase (ethylene-forming) =

Class of enzymes

Identifiers
- EC no.: 1.13.12.19

Databases
- IntEnz: IntEnz view
- BRENDA: BRENDA entry
- ExPASy: NiceZyme view
- KEGG: KEGG entry
- MetaCyc: metabolic pathway
- PRIAM: profile
- PDB structures: RCSB PDB PDBe PDBsum
Search
- PMC: articles
- PubMed: articles
- NCBI: proteins

2-oxoglutarate dioxygenase (ethylene-forming) (EC 1.13.12.19, ethylene-forming enzyme, EFE) is an enzyme with systematic name 2-oxoglutarate:oxygen oxidoreductase (decarboxylating, ethylene-forming). This enzyme catalyses the following chemical reaction

2-oxoglutarate + O_{2} $\rightleftharpoons$ ethylene + 3 CO_{2} + H_{2}O

2-oxoglutarate dioxygenase produces ethylene in bacteria of the Pseudomonas syringae group.
