= Dimethylaminoethyl acrylate =

Names
- Preferred IUPAC name 2-(Dimethylamino)ethyl prop-2-enoate

Identifiers
| CAS Number | 2439-35-2 |
| 3D model (JSmol) | Interactive image |
| ChEMBL | ChEMBL2135857 |
| ChemSpider | 16195 |
| ECHA InfoCard | 100.017.691 |
| EC Number | 219-460-0 |
| PubChem CID | 17111 |
| UNII | 5YES121FTL |
| UN number | 3302 |
| CompTox Dashboard (EPA) | DTXSID5025100 |
- InChI: InChI=1S/C7H13NO2/c1-4-7(9)10-6-5-8(2)3/h4H,1,5-6H2,2-3H3 Key: DPBJAVGHACCNRL-UHFFFAOYSA-N
- SMILES: CN(C)CCOC(=O)C=C

Properties
| Chemical formula | C_{7}H_{13}NO_{2} |
| Molar mass | 143.19 g·mol^{−1} |
| Appearance | yellowish liquid with a pungent, amine-like odor |
| Solubility in water | soluble in water (240 g/L) upon hydrolysis, miscible with organic solvents |

Hazards
- GHS labelling
| Pictograms | (GHS02: Flammable) (GHS05: Corrosive) (GHS06: Toxic) (GHS07: Exclamation mark) (GHS09: Environmental hazard) |
| Signal word | Danger |
| Hazard statements | H226, H302, H311, H314, H317, H330, H400, H412 |
| Precautionary statements | P210, P233, P240, P241, P242, P243, P260, P264, P270, P271, P272, P273, P280, P284, P301+P312, P301+P330+P331, P302+P352, P303+P361+P353, P304+P340, P305+P351+P338, P310, P312, P320, P321, P330, P333+P313, P361, P363, P370+P378, P391, P403+P233, P403+P235, P405, P501 |
- Except where otherwise noted, data are given for materials in their standard state (at 25 °C [77 °F], 100 kPa). Infobox references

Dimethylaminoethyl acrylate (2-dimethylaminoethyl acrylate) or DMAEA is an unsaturated carboxylic acid ester having a tertiary amino group. It is a colorless to yellowish, water-miscible liquid with a pungent, amine-like odor. DMAEA is an important acrylic monomer that gives basic properties to copolymers.

== Preparation ==
2-Dimethylaminoethyl acrylate is prepared via transesterification of acrylic acid esters such as methyl acrylate (R = -CH_{3}) or ethyl acrylate (R = -CH_{2}-CH_{3}) with 2-dimethylaminoethanol under acid catalysis with tin compounds (for example stannoxanes) or titanium compounds (for example tetraisopropyl orthotitanate). More than 95% yield can be achieved.

Umesterung von Acrylaten mit Dimethylaminoethanol

During the reaction, inhibitors must be present (such as phenothiazine), because of the high tendency of starting material and product to polymerize. When ethyl acrylate is used as a reactant, ethanol is formed; this forms with the ethyl acrylate an azeotrope of the composition ethanol/ethyl acrylate 72.7:26.3%, which boils at 77.5 °C under atmospheric pressure. To achieve a high reaction yield, the ethanol is distilled off from the reaction mixture. The product is purified by vacuum distillation and stabilized with about 1,000 ppm 4-methoxyphenol (MEHQ).

== Properties ==
Dimethylaminoethyl acrylate is a clear, colorless to slightly yellowish liquid with a pungent amine-like odor. It is miscible with water, reacts bases and hydrolyzes rapidly to acrylic acid and dimethylaminoethanol. It can form ignitable mixtures with air. DMAEA tends to spontaneously polymerize at elevated temperatures, upon irradiation, and in the presence of free-radical initiators. It must therefore be adequately stabilized, stored in a dry and cool place (<25 °C). DMAEA is very toxic because of its high inhalation toxicity.

== Use ==
Dimethylaminoethyl acrylate is an acrylic acid ester carrying a functional group with basic properties. It therefore reacts as an α, β-unsaturated carbonyl compound in an addition reaction with nucleophiles in a Michael addition.

As a reactive monomer, 2-dimethylaminoethyl acrylate forms homopolymers and copolymers with acrylic acid and acrylic acid salts, amides and esters, as well as methacrylates, acrylonitrile, maleic acid esters, vinyl acetate, chloroethene (vinyl chloride), 1,1-dichloroethene, styrene, 1,3-butadiene, unsaturated polyesters and drying oils. In copolymers, DMAEA improves their nucleophilicity, basicity, water solubility and adhesion to polar negatively charged substrates, as well as dyeability of acrylic fibers with anionic dyes. Such copolymers are used as resins and paints, coatings and adhesives, as well as hair spray.

The most significant use for DMAEA is the quaternization with alkylating agents (for example chloromethane, dimethyl sulfate or benzyl chloride) to the quaternary ammonium salt.

Quaternisierung von Dimethylaminoethylacrylat

The most important compound is the reaction product with methyl chloride, trimethylammonium ethyl acrylate chloride. It has the most pronounced cationic properties of all acrylates and is traded as an 80% aqueous solution. Copolymerization of trimethylammoniumethyl acrylate chloride with acrylamide leads to high molecular weight cationic polyacrylamides, which are widely used as coagulants and flocculants in waste water purification and as retention and dewatering agents in papermaking.
