= Dimethylethanolamine =

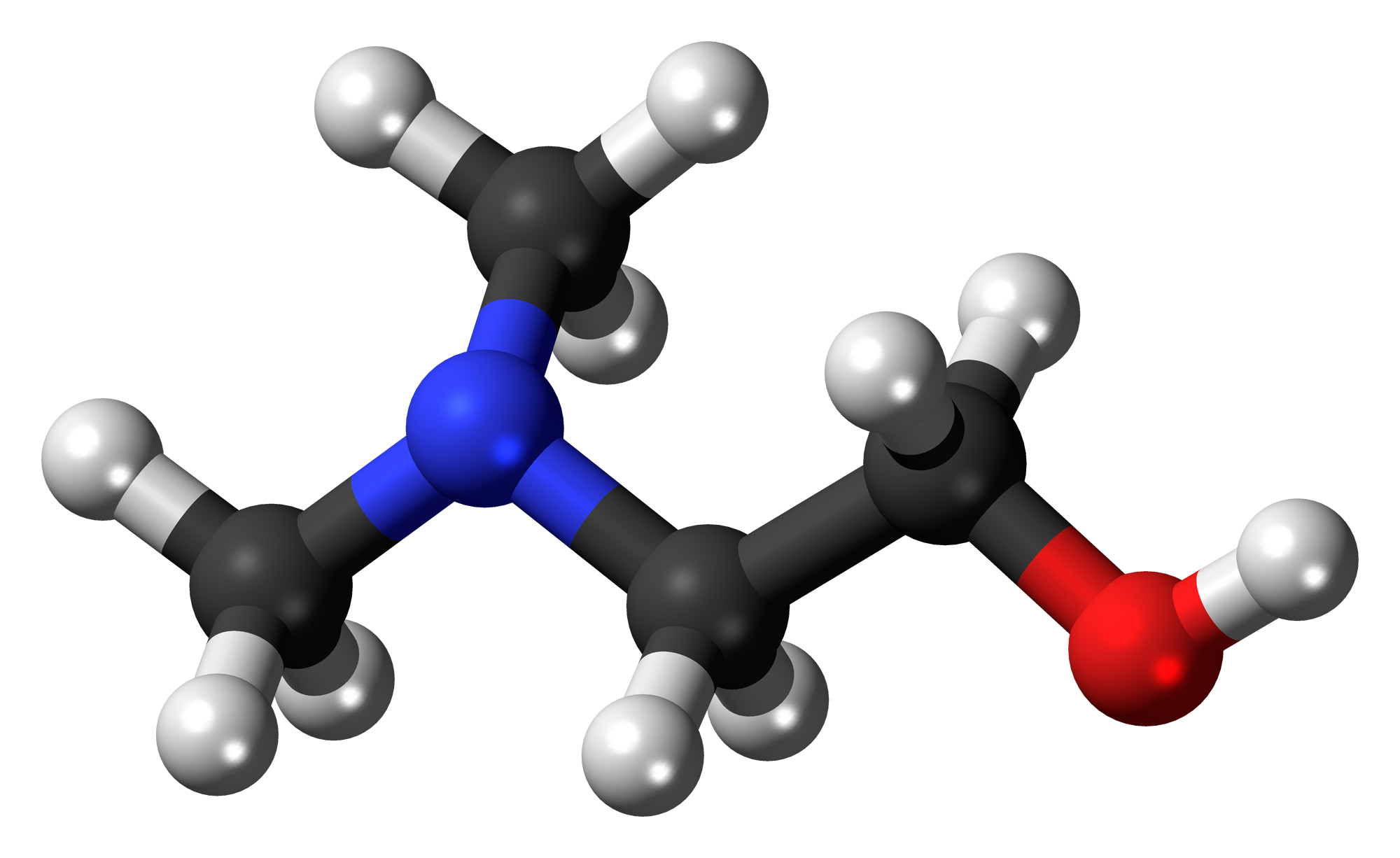

Names
- Preferred IUPAC name 2-(Dimethylamino)ethan-1-ol
- Other names: Deanol; Dimethyl ethanolamine; Dimethylaminoethanol; N,N-Dimethylaminoethanol; N,N-Dimethylethanolamine

Identifiers
CAS Number	108-01-0
3D model (JSmol)	Interactive image
Abbreviations	DMAE, DMEA
Beilstein Reference	1209235
ChEBI	CHEBI:271436
ChEMBL	ChEMBL1135
ChemSpider	13854944
ECHA InfoCard	100.003.221
EC Number	203-542-8
KEGG	D07777
MeSH	Deanol
PubChem CID	7902
RTECS number	KK6125000
UNII	2N6K9DRA24
UN number	2051
CompTox Dashboard (EPA)	DTXSID2020505
- InChI: InChI=1S/C4H11NO/c1-5(2)3-4-6/h6H,3-4H2,1-2H3 Key: UEEJHVSXFDXPFK-UHFFFAOYSA-N
- SMILES: CN(C)CCO

Properties
Chemical formula	C_{4}H_{11}NO
Molar mass	89.138 g·mol^{−1}
Appearance	Colourless liquid
Odor	Fishy, ammoniacal
Density	890 mg mL^{−1}
Melting point	−59.00 °C; −74.20 °F; 214.15 K
Boiling point	134.1 °C; 273.3 °F; 407.2 K
log P	−0.25
Vapor pressure	816 Pa (at 20 °C)
Acidity (pK_{a})	9.23 (at 20 °C)
Basicity (pK_{b})	4.77 (at 20 °C)
Refractive index (n_{D})	1.4294

Pharmacology
ATC code	N06BX04 (WHO)

Hazards
- GHS labelling
Pictograms	(GHS02: Flammable) (GHS05: Corrosive) (GHS07: Exclamation mark)
Signal word	Danger
Hazard statements	H226, H302, H312, H314, H332
Precautionary statements	P280, P305+P351+P338, P310
Flash point	39 °C (102 °F; 312 K)
Explosive limits	1.4–12.2%
- Lethal dose or concentration (LD, LC)
LD_{50} (median dose)	1.214 g/kg (dermal, rabbit); 2 g/kg (oral, rat)

Related compounds
Related alkanols	N-Methylethanolamine; Diethylethanolamine; Diethanolamine; N,N-Diisopropylaminoethanol; Methyl diethanolamine; Triethanolamine; Bis-tris methane
Related compounds	Diethylhydroxylamine
- Except where otherwise noted, data are given for materials in their standard state (at 25 °C [77 °F], 100 kPa). verify (what is ?) Infobox references

Dimethylethanolamine (DMAE or DMEA) is an organic compound with the formula (CH_{3})_{2}NCH_{2}CH_{2}OH. It is bifunctional, containing both a tertiary amine and primary alcohol functional groups. It is a colorless viscous liquid. It is used in skin care products for improving skin tone and also taken orally as a nootropic. It is prepared by the ethoxylation of dimethylamine.

== Industrial uses ==
Dimethylaminoethanol is used as a curing agent for polyurethanes and epoxy resins. It is a precursor to other chemicals, such as the nitrogen mustard 2-dimethylaminoethyl chloride. The acrylate ester, dimethylaminoethyl acrylate is used as a flocculating agent.

Related compounds are used in gas purification, e.g. removal of hydrogen sulfide from sour gas streams.

== Human uses ==
The bitartrate salt of DMAE, i.e. N,N-dimethylethanolamine bitartrate, is sold as a dietary supplement. It is a white powder providing 37% DMAE.

Animal tests show possible benefit for improving spatial memory and working memory.

== See also ==
- Choline
- Diphenhydramine
- Doxylamine
- Ethanolamine
- Meclofenoxate (Centrophenoxine)
- Orphenadrine
