= N,N-Diisopropylaminoethanol =

- Skeletal formula of N,N-diisopropylaminoethanol with some implicit hydrogens shown

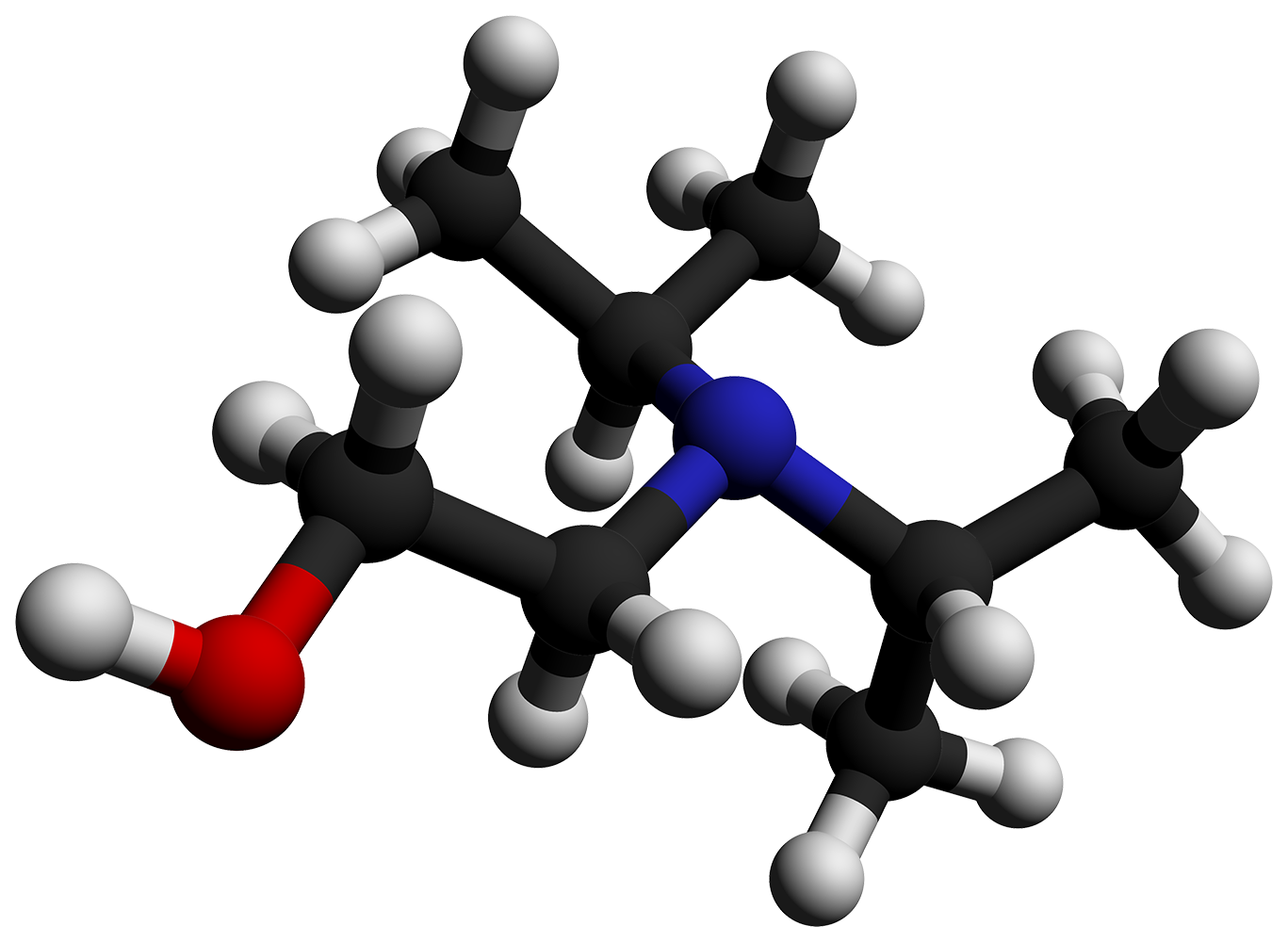

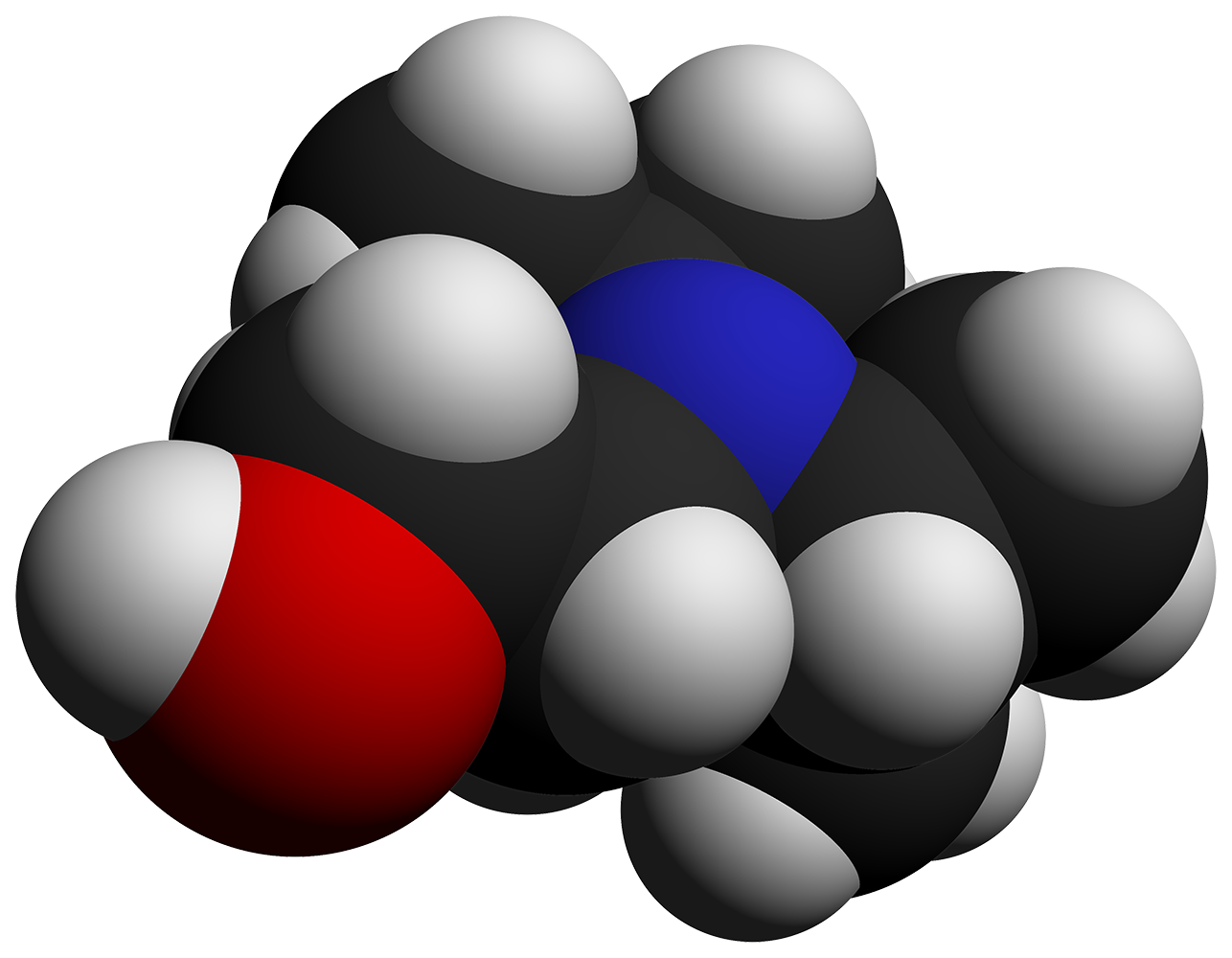

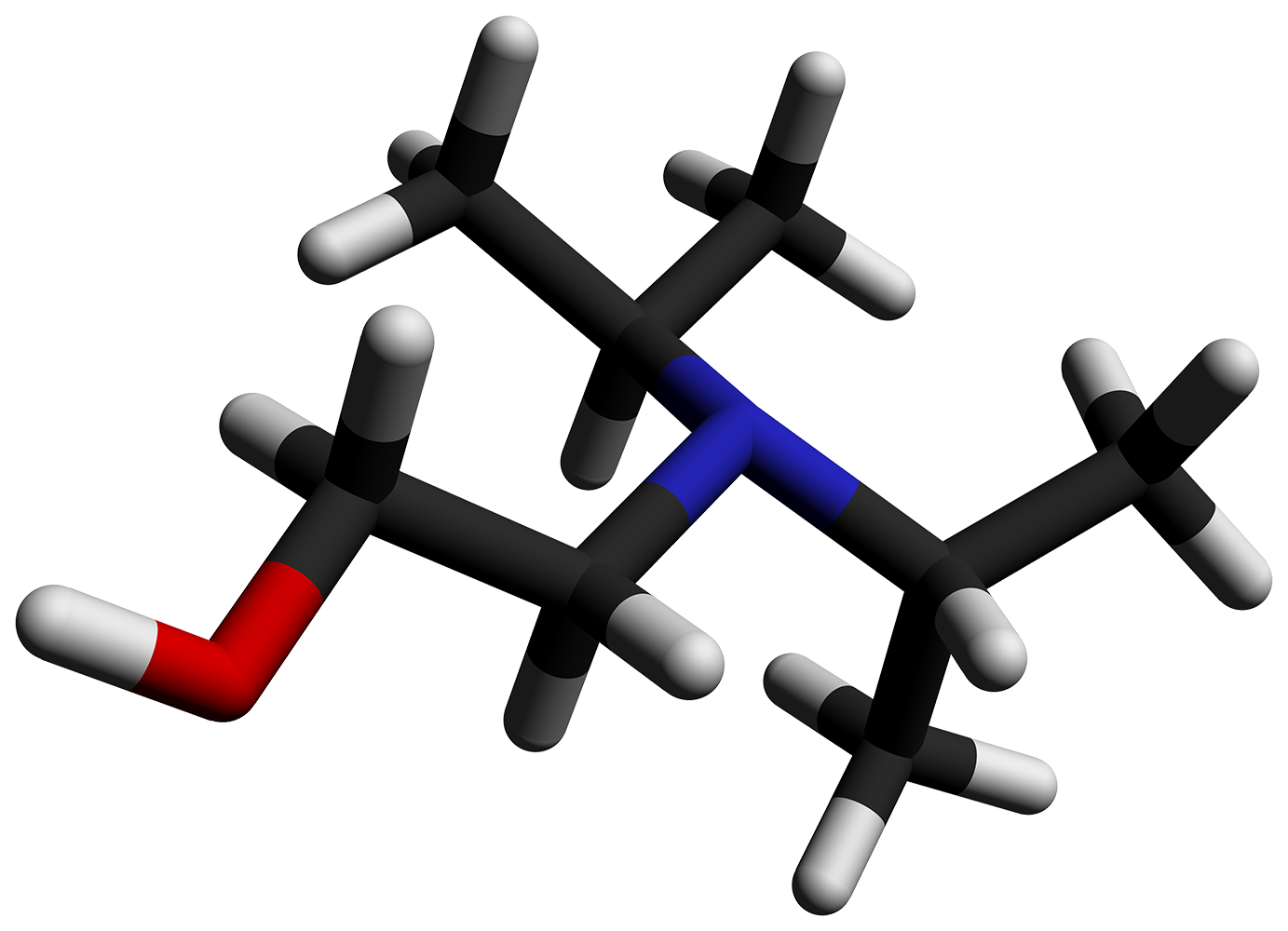

Names
- Preferred IUPAC name 2-[Di(propan-2-yl)amino]ethan-1-ol
- Other names 2-[Di(propan-2-yl)amino]ethanol; 2-(Diisopropylamino)ethanol

Identifiers
CAS Number	96-80-0
3D model (JSmol)	Interactive image
Beilstein Reference	1697955
ChEMBL	ChEMBL122184
ChemSpider	7039
ECHA InfoCard	100.002.307
EC Number	202-536-2
MeSH	2-diisopropylaminoethanol
PubChem CID	7313
RTECS number	KK5950000
UNII	DK7FND4TJZ
UN number	2922
CompTox Dashboard (EPA)	DTXSID6021822
- InChI: InChI=1S/C8H19NO/c1-7(2)9(5-6-10)8(3)4/h7-8,10H,5-6H2,1-4H3 Key: ZYWUVGFIXPNBDL-UHFFFAOYSA-N
- SMILES: CC(C)N(CCO)C(C)C

Properties
Chemical formula	C_{8}H_{19}NO
Molar mass	145.246 g·mol^{−1}
Appearance	Colorless liquid
Odor	Ammoniacal
Density	826 mg mL^{−1}
Melting point	−39.2 °C; −38.6 °F; 233.9 K
Boiling point	190.1 °C; 374.1 °F; 463.2 K
log P	1.476
Vapor pressure	<100 Pa (at 20 °C)
Refractive index (n_{D})	1.442

Hazards
- GHS labelling
Pictograms	(GHS05: Corrosive) (GHS06: Toxic)
Hazard statements	H302, H311, H314, H331
Precautionary statements	P261, P280, P305+P351+P338, P310
NFPA 704 (fire diamond)	2 1 1
Flash point	64 °C (147 °F; 337 K)
- Lethal dose or concentration (LD, LC)
LD_{50} (median dose)	394 mg kg^{−1} (dermal, rabbit); 860 mg kg^{−1} (oral, rat)
- Safety data sheet (SDS)

Related compounds
Related alkanols	N-Methylethanolamine; Dimethylethanolamine; Diethylethanolamine; Diethanolamine; Methyl diethanolamine; Triethanolamine; Bis-tris methane; Meglumine
Related compounds	Diethylhydroxylamine
- Except where otherwise noted, data are given for materials in their standard state (at 25 °C [77 °F], 100 kPa). Infobox references

N,N-Diisopropylaminoethanol (DIPA) is a processor for production of various chemicals and also an intermediate in the production of the nerve agents VX and NX. It is a colorless liquid, although aged samples can appear yellow.

== Health effects ==
Inhalation and skin contact are expected to be the primary ways of occupational exposure to this chemical. Based on single exposure animal tests, it is considered to be slightly toxic if swallowed or inhaled, moderately toxic if absorbed through skin as well as being corrosive to eyes and skin. Vapor may be irritating to the eyes and upper respiratory tract. Temporary and reversible visual disturbances characterized by mildly blurred vision, a blue-gray discolorization of sight (blue haze) or halo vision (appearance of a halo when looking at light sources) may also occur.
