= Ethanolamine =

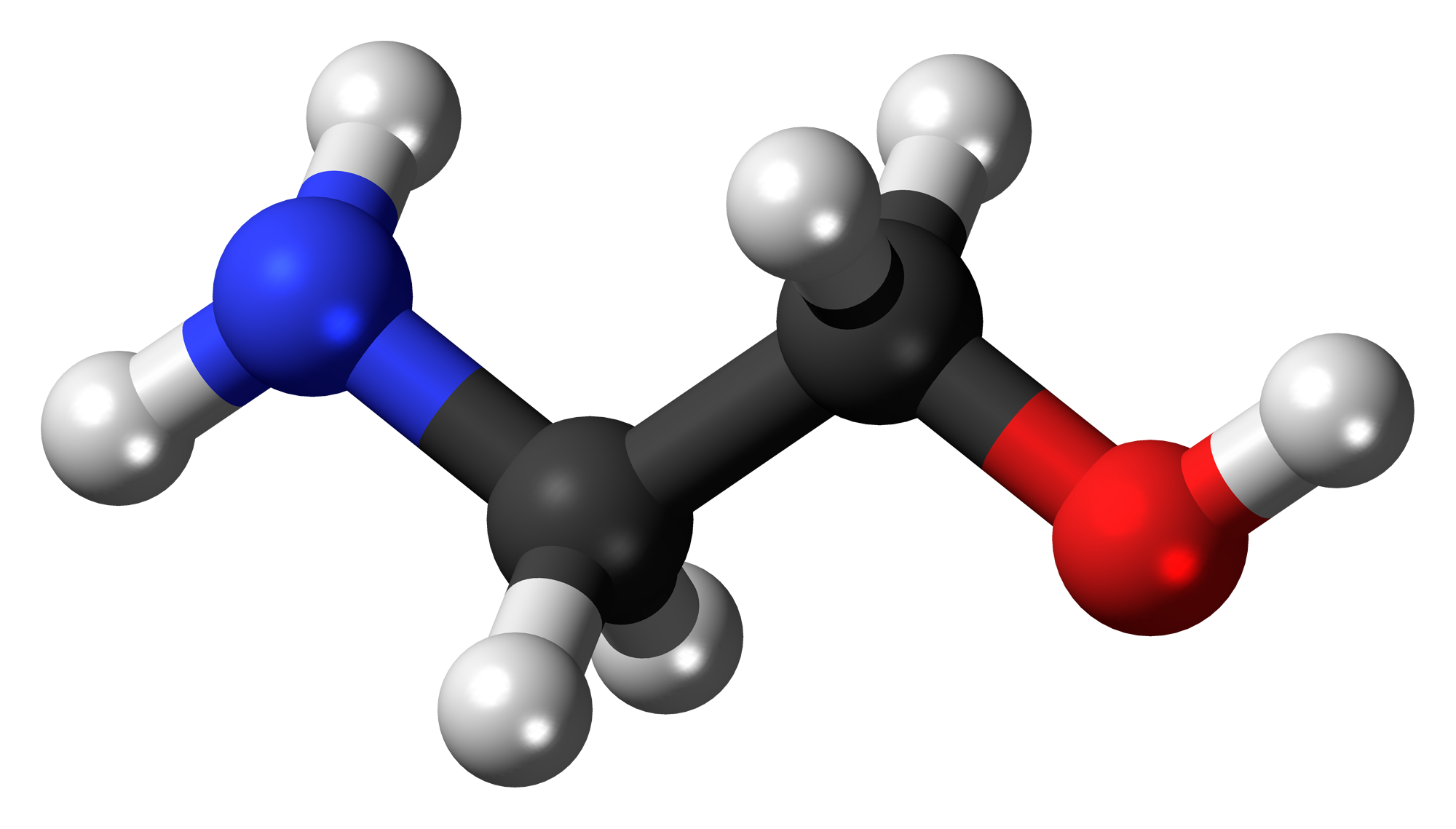

Names
- Preferred IUPAC name 2-Aminoethan-1-ol
- Other names: 2-Aminoethanol; 2-Amino-1-ethanol; Ethanolamine (not recommended); Monoethanolamine; β-Aminoethanol; β-hydroxyethylamine; β-Aminoethyl alcohol; Glycinol; Olamine; MEA; Ethylolamine; 2-Hydroxyethylamine; Colamine

Identifiers
CAS Number	141-43-5
3D model (JSmol)	Interactive image
ChEBI	CHEBI:16000
ChEMBL	ChEMBL104943
ChemSpider	13835336
DrugBank	DB03994
ECHA InfoCard	100.004.986
EC Number	205-483-3
KEGG	D05074
PubChem CID	700
RTECS number	KJ5775000
UNII	5KV86114PT
CompTox Dashboard (EPA)	DTXSID6022000
- InChI: InChI=1S/C2H7NO/c3-1-2-4/h4H,1-3H2 Key: HZAXFHJVJLSVMW-UHFFFAOYSA-N; InChI=1/C2H7NO/c3-1-2-4/h4H,1-3H2 Key: HZAXFHJVJLSVMW-UHFFFAOYAD
- SMILES: NCCO

Properties
Chemical formula	C_{2}H_{7}NO
Molar mass	61.084 g·mol^{−1}
Appearance	Viscous colourless liquid
Odor	Unpleasant ammonia-like odour
Density	1.0117 g/cm^{3}
Melting point	10.3 °C (50.5 °F; 283.4 K)
Boiling point	170 °C (338 °F; 443 K)
Solubility in water	Miscible
Vapor pressure	64 Pa (20 °C)
Acidity (pK_{a})	9.50
Refractive index (n_{D})	1.4539 (20 °C)

Hazards
- GHS labelling
Pictograms	(GHS05: Corrosive) (GHS07: Exclamation mark)
Signal word	Danger
Hazard statements	H302, H312, H314, H332, H335, H412
Precautionary statements	P261, P273, P303+P361+P353, P305+P351+P338
NFPA 704 (fire diamond)	3 2 0
Flash point	85 °C (185 °F; 358 K) (closed cup)
Autoignition temperature	410 °C (770 °F; 683 K)
Explosive limits	5.5–17%
- Lethal dose or concentration (LD, LC)
LD_{50} (median dose)	3320 mg/kg (rat, oral); 620 mg/kg (guinea pig, oral); 2050 mg/kg (rat, oral); 1475 mg/kg (mouse, oral); 1000 mg/kg (rabbit, oral); 700 mg/kg (mouse, oral); 1720–1970 mg/kg (rat, oral)
- NIOSH (US health exposure limits)
PEL (Permissible)	TWA: 3 ppm (6 mg/m^{3})
REL (Recommended)	TWA: 3 ppm (8 mg/m^{3}); ST: 6 ppm (15 mg/m^{3})
IDLH (Immediate danger)	30 ppm
Safety data sheet (SDS)	Sigma

Related compounds
Related compounds	Ethylene glycol; Ethylenediamine; N-Methylethanolamine; Diethanolamine; Triethanolamine; 1-Aminoethanol; Aminomethanol; 3-Amino-1-propanol; 4-Amino-1-butanol; 5-Amino-1-pentanol
- Except where otherwise noted, data are given for materials in their standard state (at 25 °C [77 °F], 100 kPa). verify (what is ?) Infobox references

Ethanolamine (2-aminoethanol, monoethanolamine, ETA, or MEA) is a naturally occurring organic chemical compound with the formula H_{2}NCH_{2}CH_{2}OH or C_{2}H_{7}NO. The molecule is bifunctional, containing both a primary amine and a primary alcohol. Ethanolamine is a colorless, viscous liquid with an odor reminiscent of ammonia.

Ethanolamine is commonly called monoethanolamine or MEA in order to be distinguished from diethanolamine (DEA) and triethanolamine (TEOA). The ethanolamines comprise a group of amino alcohols. A class of antihistamines is identified as ethanolamines, which includes carbinoxamine, clemastine, dimenhydrinate, chlorphenoxamine, diphenhydramine and doxylamine.

== History ==
Ethanolamines, or in particular, their salts, were discovered by Charles Adolphe Wurtz in 1860 by heating 2-chloroethanol with ammonia solution while studying derivatives of ethylene oxide he discovered a year earlier. He wasn't able to separate the salts or isolate any free bases.

In 1897 Ludwig Knorr developed the modern industrial route (see below) and separated the products, including MEA, by fractional distillation, for the first time studying their properties.

None of the ethanolamines were of any commercial importance until after the WWII industrial production of ethylene oxide took off.

== Occurrence in nature ==
MEA molecules are a component in the formation of cellular membranes and are thus a molecular building block for life. Ethanolamine is the second-most-abundant head group for phospholipids, substances found in biological membranes (particularly those of prokaryotes); e.g., phosphatidylethanolamine. It is also used in messenger molecules such as palmitoylethanolamide, which has an effect on CB1 receptors.

MEA was thought to exist only on Earth and on certain asteroids, but in 2021 evidence was found that these molecules exist in interstellar space.

Ethanolamine is biosynthesized by decarboxylation of serine:

HOCH_{2}CH(CO_{2}H)NH_{2} → H_{2}NCH_{2}CH_{2}OH + CO_{2}

Derivatives of ethanolamine are widespread in nature; e.g., lipids, as precursor of a variety of N-acylethanolamines (NAEs), that modulate several animal and plant physiological processes such as seed germination, plant–pathogen interactions, chloroplast development and flowering, as well as precursor, combined with arachidonic acid C_{20}H_{32}O_{2} 20:4, ω-6), to form the endocannabinoid anandamide (AEA: C_{22}H_{37}NO_{2}; 20:4, ω-6).

MEA is biodegraded by ethanolamine ammonia-lyase, a B12-dependent enzyme. It is converted to ammonia and acetaldehyde via initial H-atom abstraction.

H_{2}NCH_{2}CH_{2}OH → NH_{3} + CH_{3}CHO

== Industrial production ==
Monoethanolamine is produced by treating ethylene oxide with aqueous ammonia; the reaction also produces diethanolamine and triethanolamine. The ratio of the products can be controlled by the stoichiometry of the reactants.

== Applications ==
MEA is used as feedstock in the production of detergents, emulsifiers, polishes, pharmaceuticals, corrosion inhibitors, and chemical intermediates.

For example, reacting ethanolamine with ammonia gives ethylenediamine, a precursor of the commonly used chelating agent, EDTA.

=== Gas stream scrubbing ===
Monoethanolamines can scrub combusted-coal, combusted-methane and combusted-biogas flue emissions of carbon dioxide (CO_{2}) very efficiently. MEA carbon dioxide scrubbing is also used to regenerate the air on submarines.

Solutions of MEA in water are used as a gas stream scrubbing liquid in amine treaters. For example, aqueous MEA is used to remove carbon dioxide (CO_{2}) and hydrogen sulfide (H_{2}S) from various gas streams; e.g., flue gas and sour natural gas. The MEA ionizes dissolved acidic compounds, making them polar and considerably more soluble.

MEA scrubbing solutions can be recycled through a regeneration unit. When heated, MEA, being a rather weak base, will release dissolved H_{2}S or CO_{2} gas resulting in a pure MEA solution.

=== Other uses ===
In pharmaceutical formulations, MEA is used primarily for buffering or preparation of emulsions. MEA can be used as pH regulator in cosmetics.

It is an injectable sclerosant as a treatment option of symptomatic hemorrhoids. 2–5 ml of ethanolamine oleate can be injected into the mucosa just above the hemorrhoids to cause ulceration and mucosal fixation thus preventing hemorrhoids from descending out of the anal canal.

It is also an ingredient in cleaning fluid for automobile windshields.

=== pH-control amine ===
Ethanolamine is often used for alkalinization of water in steam cycles of power plants, including nuclear power plants with pressurized water reactors. This alkalinization is performed to control corrosion of metal components. ETA (or sometimes a similar organic amine; e.g., morpholine) is selected because it does not accumulate in steam generators (boilers) and crevices due to its volatility, but rather distributes relatively uniformly throughout the entire steam cycle. In such application, ETA is a key ingredient of so-called "all-volatile treatment" of water (AVT).

== Reactions ==
Upon reaction with carbon dioxide, 2 equivalents of ethanolamine react through the intermediacy of carbonic acid to form a carbamate salt, which when heated usually reforms back to ethanolamine and carbon dioxide but occasionally can also cyclizate to 2-oxazolidone, generating amine gas treatment wastes.
