= C6H14O2 =

The molecular formula C_{6}H_{14}O_{2} (molar mass: 118.17 g/mol, exact mass: 118.0994 u) may refer to:

- 2-Butoxyethanol
- Diethoxyethanes
  - 1,1-Diethoxyethane
  - 1,2-Diethoxyethane
- Ethylene glycol diethyl ether
- Hexanediols
  - 1,6-Hexanediol
  - 2,5-Hexanediol
- 2-Methyl-2,4-pentanediol (MPD)
- Pinacol
