= List of UN numbers 1101 to 1200 =

UN numbers from UN1101 to UN1200 as assigned by the United Nations Committee of Experts on the Transport of Dangerous Goods are as follows:

== UN 1101 to UN 1200 ==
UN Number	Class	Proper Shipping Name
UN 1101	?	(UN No. no longer in use) Diethylaluminium chloride (UN No. no longer in use)
UN 1102	?	(UN No. no longer in use) Triethylaluminium (UN No. no longer in use)
UN 1103	?	(UN No. no longer in use) Trimethylaluminium (UN No. no longer in use)
UN 1104	3	Amyl acetates
UN 1105	3	Pentanols
UN 1106	3	Amylamines
UN 1107	3	Amyl chlorides
UN 1108	3	1-Pentene (n-amylene)
UN 1109	3	Amyl formates
UN 1110	3	n-Amyl methyl ketone
UN 1111	3	Amyl mercaptans
UN 1112	3	Amyl nitrate
UN 1113	3	Amyl nitrites
UN 1114	3	Benzene
UN 1115	?	(UN No. no longer in use) Benzine (UN No. no longer in use)
UN 1116 to 1117	?	(UN No.s no longer in use)
UN 1118	?	(UN No. no longer in use) Brake fluid (UN No. no longer in use)
UN 1119	?	(UN No. no longer in use)
UN 1120	3	Butanols
UN 1121 to 1122	?	(UN No.s no longer in use)
UN 1123	3	Butyl acetates
UN 1124	?	(UN No. no longer in use)
UN 1125	3	n-Butylamine
UN 1126	3	1-Bromobutane
UN 1127	3	Chlorobutanes
UN 1128	3	n-Butyl formate
UN 1129	3	Butyraldehyde
UN 1130	3	Camphor oil
UN 1131	3	Carbon disulfide
UN 1132	?	(UN No. no longer in use) Carbon remover or Carbon remover, liquid (UN No. no longer in use)
UN 1133	3	Adhesives, containing a flammable liquid
UN 1134	3	Chlorobenzene
UN 1135	6.1	Ethylene chlorohydrin
UN 1136	3	Coal tar distillates, flammable
UN 1137	?	(UN No. no longer in use) Coal tar distillate (UN No. no longer in use)
UN 1138	?	(UN No. no longer in use)
UN 1139	3	Coating solution (includes surface treatments or coatings used for industrial or other purposes such as vehicle undercoating, drum or barrel lining)
UN 1140 to 1141	?	(UN No.s no longer in use)
UN 1142	?	(UN No. no longer in use) Flammable liquid preparations, n.o.s. (UN No. no longer in use)
UN 1143	6.1	Crotonaldehyde, stabilized
UN 1144	3	Crotonylene
UN 1145	3	Cyclohexane
UN 1146	3	Cyclopentane
UN 1147	3	Decahydronaphthalene
UN 1148	3	Diacetone alcohol
UN 1149	3	Dibutyl ethers
UN 1150	3	1,2-Dichloroethylene
UN 1151	?	(UN No. no longer in use)
UN 1152	3	Dichloropentanes
UN 1153	3	Ethylene glycol diethyl ether
UN 1154	3	Diethylamine
UN 1155	3	Diethyl ether or Ethyl ether
UN 1156	3	Diethyl ketone
UN 1157	3	Diisobutyl ketone
UN 1158	3	Diisopropylamine
UN 1159	3	Diisopropyl ether
UN 1160	3	Dimethylamine solution
UN 1161	3	Dimethyl carbonate
UN 1162	3	Dimethyldichlorosilane
UN 1163	6.1	Dimethylhydrazine, unsymmetrical
UN 1164	3	Dimethyl sulfide
UN 1165	3	Dioxane
UN 1166	3	Dioxolane
UN 1167	3	Divinyl ether, inhibited
UN 1168	?	(UN No. no longer in use) Driers or varnish, liquid, n.o.s. (UN No. no longer in use)
UN 1169	(3)	(UN No. no longer in use) Extracts, aromatic, liquid (UN No. no longer in use)
UN 1170	3	Ethanol (Ethyl alcohol) or Ethanol solution (Ethyl alcohol solution)
UN 1171	3	Ethylene glycol monoethyl ether
UN 1172	3	Ethylene glycol monoethyl ether acetate
UN 1173	3	Ethyl acetate
UN 1174	?	(UN No. no longer in use)
UN 1175	3	Ethylbenzene
UN 1176	3	Ethyl borate
UN 1177	3	2-Ethylbutyl acetate
UN 1178	3	2-Ethylbutyraldehyde
UN 1179	3	Ethyl butyl ether
UN 1180	3	Ethyl butyrate
UN 1181	6.1	Ethyl chloroacetate
UN 1182	6.1	Ethyl chloroformate
UN 1183	4.3	Ethyldichlorosilane
UN 1184	3	Ethylene dichloride
UN 1185	6.1	Ethyleneimine, inhibited
UN 1186 to 1187	?	(UN No.s no longer in use)
UN 1188	3	Ethylene glycol monomethyl ether
UN 1189	3	Ethylene glycol monomethyl ether acetate
UN 1190	3	Ethyl formate
UN 1191	3	Octyl aldehydes
UN 1192	3	Ethyl lactate
UN 1193	3	Ethyl methyl ketone or Methyl ethyl ketone
UN 1194	3	Ethyl nitrate solutions
UN 1195	3	Ethyl propionate
UN 1196	3	Ethyltrichlorosilane
UN 1197	3	Extracts, liquid, for flavoring or aroma
UN 1198	3	Formaldehyde, solutions, flammable
UN 1199	6.1	Furaldehydes
UN 1200	?	(UN No. no longer in use)

n.o.s. = not otherwise specified meaning a collective entry to which substances, mixtures, solutions or articles may be assigned if a) they are not mentioned by name in 3.2 Dangerous Goods List AND b) they exhibit chemical, physical and/or dangerous properties corresponding to the Class, classification code, packing group and the name and description of the n.o.s. entry

== See also ==
- Lists of UN numbers
