= C6H12O3 =

The molecular formula C_{6}H_{12}O_{3} may refer to:

- Butoxyacetic acid
- 2-Ethoxyethyl acetate
- 2-Hydroxyisocaproic acid
- 4-Hydroxy-4-methylpentanoic acid
- Paraldehyde
- Propylene glycol methyl ether acetate
- Solketal
- 9-Crown-3
