= C6H14O3 =

The molecular formula C_{6}H_{14}O_{3} (molar mass: 134.17 g/mol, exact mass: 134.0943 u) may refer to:

- Diglyme
- Dipropylene glycol
- 2-(2-Ethoxyethoxy)ethanol
- Trimethylolpropane
