= C5H11Cl =

The molecular formula C_{5}H_{11}Cl (molar mass: 106.59 g/mol, exact mass: 106.0549 u) may refer to:

- tert-Amyl chloride (2-methyl-2-butyl chloride)
- 1-Chloropentane
