= C8H18O3 =

The molecular formula C_{8}H_{18}O_{3} (molar mass: 162.229 g/mol) may refer to:

- Diethylene glycol butyl ether
- Diethylene glycol diethyl ether
- Triethyl orthoacetate
