= TEGDME =

TEGDME may refer to the chemicals:

- Triethylene glycol dimethyl ether (triglyme).
- Tetraethylene glycol dimethyl ether (tetraglyme).
