= Hexanediol =

Hexanediol may refer to:

- 1,2-Hexanediol
- 1,3-Hexanediol
- 1,4-Hexanediol
- 1,5-Hexanediol
- 1,6-Hexanediol
- 2,3-Hexanediol
- 2,4-Hexanediol
- 2,5-Hexanediol
- 3,4-Hexanediol
