= Amyl chloride =

Amyl chloride may refer to any of the monochlorinated derivatives of the isomers of pentane. They have the molecular formula C_{5}H_{11}Cl.

- tert-Amyl chloride
- 1-Chloropentane (n-amyl chloride)
- 2-Chloropentane
- 3-Chloropentane
- 1-Chloro-3-methylbutane (isoamyl chloride)
