= C5H12O3 =

The molecular formula C_{5}H_{12}O_{3} (molar mass: 120.15 g/mol, exact mass: 120.0786 u) may refer to:

- 2-(2-Methoxyethoxy)ethanol
- Trimethylolethane (TME)
