= Triethylene glycol dimethyl ether =

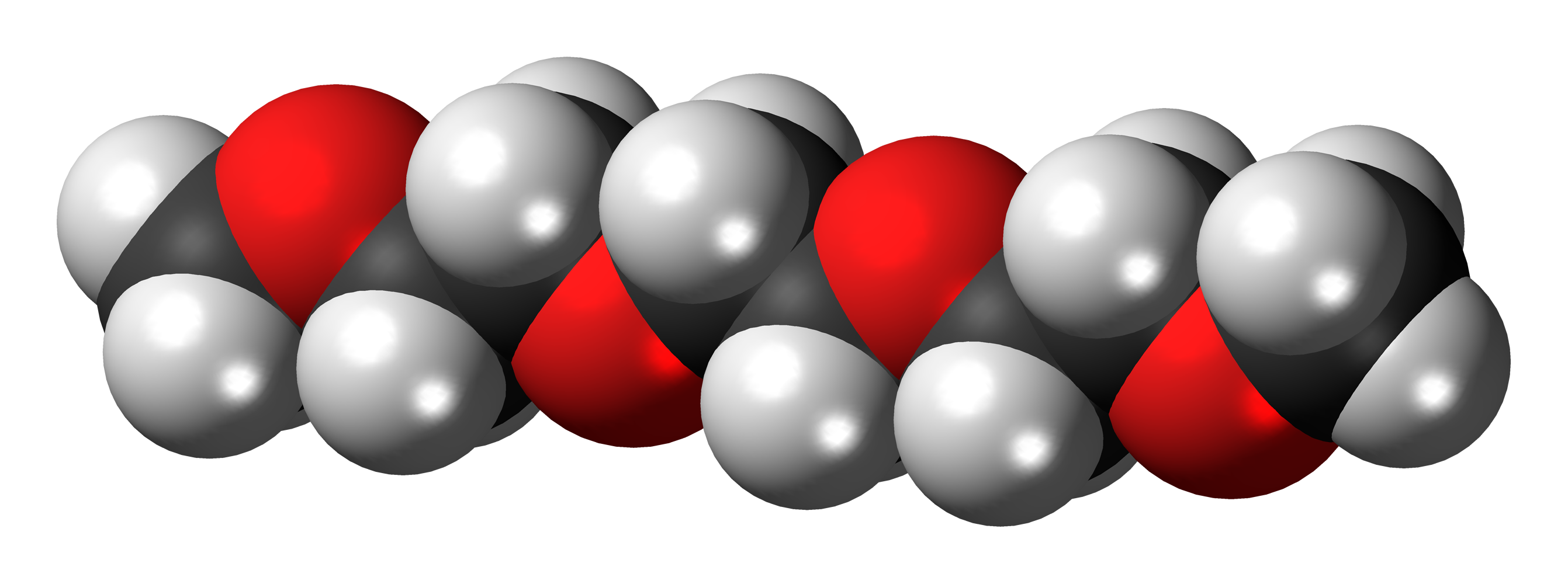

Names
- Preferred IUPAC name 2,5,8,11-Tetraoxadodecane
- Other names Triglyme; 1,2-Bis(2-methoxyethoxy)ethane

Identifiers
CAS Number	112-49-2
3D model (JSmol)	Interactive image
Abbreviations	TEGDME
ChEBI	CHEBI:31967
ChemSpider	13835222
ECHA InfoCard	100.003.616
PubChem CID	8189
UNII	32YXG88KK0
CompTox Dashboard (EPA)	DTXSID8026224
- InChI: InChI=1S/C8H18O4/c1-9-3-5-11-7-8-12-6-4-10-2/h3-8H2,1-2H3 Key: YFNKIDBQEZZDLK-UHFFFAOYSA-N
- SMILES: COCCOCCOCCOC

Properties
Chemical formula	C_{8}H_{18}O_{4}
Molar mass	178.228 g·mol^{−1}
Appearance	Colorless liquid
Density	0.986 g/cm^{3}
Melting point	−45 °C (−49 °F; 228 K)
Boiling point	216 °C (421 °F; 489 K)
- Except where otherwise noted, data are given for materials in their standard state (at 25 °C [77 °F], 100 kPa). Infobox references

Triethylene glycol dimethyl ether (also called triglyme) is a glycol ether and solvent. It is used as a reaction medium in organic chemistry, as well as a component of certain brake fluids, paints, adhesives, and paint strippers.

Triglyme has also been investigated as a green alternative to traditional hypergolic rocket propellants.

== See also ==
- Monoglyme
- Diglyme
- Tetraglyme
