= E181 =

E181 may refer to:

- Tannic acid
- Tetraethylene glycol dimethyl ether
