= C7H16O3 =

The molecular formula C_{7}H_{16}O_{3} (molar mass: 148.20 g/mol, exact mass: 148.1099 u) may refer to:

- Di(propylene glycol) methyl ether
- Triethyl orthoformate
