= PGME =

PGME may refer to:

- Propylene glycol methyl ether, an organic solvent
- Postgraduate Medical Education and Training Board, a UK medical training organization
