= Diethoxyethane =

Diethoxyethane may refer to:

- 1,1-Diethoxyethane
- 1,2-Diethoxyethane (ethylene glycol diethyl ether)
