= Methoxyacetic acid =

Names
- IUPAC name 2-Methoxyacetic acid
- Other names 2-Methoxyacetic acid Methyl glycolic acid

Identifiers
CAS Number	625-45-6
3D model (JSmol)	Interactive image
ChEBI	CHEBI:132098
ChEMBL	ChEMBL1697714
ChemSpider	11750
ECHA InfoCard	100.009.904
EC Number	210-894-6
PubChem CID	12251
UNII	F11T1H7Q7W
CompTox Dashboard (EPA)	DTXSID1031591
- InChI: InChI=1S/C3H6O3/c1-6-2-3(4)5/h2H2,1H3,(H,4,5) Key: RMIODHQZRUFFFF-UHFFFAOYSA-N
- SMILES: COCC(=O)O

Properties
Chemical formula	C_{3}H_{6}O_{3}
Molar mass	90.08 g/mol^{−1}
Appearance	Clear, colorless, viscous liquid with a pungent odor
Density	1.1768 g/cm^{−3}
Melting point	7–9 °C (45–48 °F; 280–282 K)
Boiling point	202–204 °C (396–399 °F; 475–477 K)
Solubility in water	Soluble in water, ethanol, and diethyl ether
Vapor pressure	1.8 mbar (20 °C); 4.8 mbar (50 °C)
Acidity (pK_{a})	3.57
- Except where otherwise noted, data are given for materials in their standard state (at 25 °C [77 °F], 100 kPa). Infobox references

Methoxyacetic acid is the organic compound with the formula CH_{3}OCH_{2}CO_{2}H. It can be viewed as a derivative of acetic acid in which a hydrogen atom of the methyl group is replaced by a methoxy group. As indicated by the synonym methyl glycolic acid, and as the simplest ether carboxylic acid, methoxyacetic acid can be understood as a methyl ether of glycolic acid.

== Production ==
In principle the compound can be prepared by reaction of sodium methoxide with monochloroacetic acid. The industrial route involves the oxidation of 2-methoxyethanol with air or oxygen in the presence of platinum catalysts.

In both humans and animals, 2-methoxyacetic acid forms via the rapid oxidation of 2-methoxyethanol by the action of alcohol dehydrogenases.

== Properties ==
Methoxyacetic acid is a colorless, viscous, and corrosive liquid with a pungent odor which, at 7 °C, freezes to a mass similar to glacial acetic acid. Due to the low solvation energy of its methoxy group, methoxyacetic acid, with a pKa value of 3.57, is more acidic than acetic acid (pKa 4.757) and glycolic acid (pKa 3.832).

Ultra-pure methoxyacetic acid (purity of 99.8%, freezing point of 8.4 °C) can be obtained via the multistep crystallization of the raw distillate, which is free of acid contaminations.

== Applications ==
Methoxyacetic acid is a precursor to two commercial fungicides, oxadixyl and mefenoxam.

=== Former applications ===
Due to its reprotoxic properties, earlier consumer and industrial applications of methoxyacetic acid as a disinfectant, biocide, or as a cleaner for the decalcification of surfaces are now obsolete. The same is true for substances such as the solvent 2-methoxyethanol or the PVC plasticizer bis(2-methoxyethyl) phthalate, which are metabolized to methoxyacetic acid.

== Safety ==
Due to its considerable reprotoxic potential, methoxyacetic acid has been adopted into the list of SVHC substances (substances of very high concern) and is only registered as an intermediate product for industrial purposes under strictly controlled conditions.

In laboratory tests, methoxyacetic acid inhibits the growth of tumor cells.
