= Zinc acetylacetonate =

Names
- IUPAC name Bis(acetylacetonato)zinc(II)
- Systematic IUPAC name Bis[(Z)-4-oxopent-2-en-2-olato-κ^{2}O,O′]zinc(II)

Identifiers
CAS Number	14024-63-6; 一hydrate: 108503-47-5
3D model (JSmol)	Interactive image; 一hydrate: Interactive image
ChemSpider	4514507; 一hydrate: 21169636
ECHA InfoCard	100.034.405
EC Number	237-860-3; 一hydrate: 683-082-6
PubChem CID	5360437; 一hydrate: 131675103
UNII	8F3XXD1RZO
- InChI: InChI=1S/2C5H8O2.Zn/c2*1-4(6)3-5(2)7;/h2*3,6H,1-2H3;/q;;+2/p-2/b2*4-3-; Key: CYDXJXDAFPJUQE-FDGPNNRMSA-L; 一hydrate: InChI=1S/2C5H8O2.H2O.Zn/c2*1-4(6)3-5(2)7;;/h2*3,6H,1-2H3;1H2;/q;;;+2/p-2/b2*4-3-;; Key: KUJHAYOLESEVSA-SUKNRPLKSA-L
- SMILES: C/C(=C/C(=O)C)/[O-].C/C(=C/C(=O)C)/[O-].[Zn+2]; 一hydrate: C/C(=C/C(=O)C)/[O-].C/C(=C/C(=O)C)/[O-].O.[Zn+2]

Properties
Chemical formula	C_{10}H_{14}O_{4}Zn
Molar mass	263.60 g·mol^{−1}
Appearance	crystals
Density	1.41 g·cm^{−3}
Melting point	124–126 °C
Boiling point	129–131 °C (13 hPa)
Solubility in water	6.9 g/L
Solubility	soluble in organic solvants

Hazards
- GHS labelling
Pictograms	(GHS07: Exclamation mark)
Signal word	Warning
Hazard statements	H315, H319, H335
Precautionary statements	P261, P264, P264+P265, P271, P280, P302+P352, P304+P340, P305+P351+P338, P319, P321, P332+P317, P337+P317, P362+P364, P403+P233, P405, P501

Related compounds
Other cations	calcium acetylacetonate barium acetylacetonate
- Except where otherwise noted, data are given for materials in their standard state (at 25 °C [77 °F], 100 kPa). Infobox references

Zinc acetylacetonate is an acetylacetonate complex of zinc, with the chemical formula of Zn(C_{5}H_{7}O_{2})_{2}. The compound is in fact a trimer, Zn_{3}(acac)_{6}, in which each Zn ion is coordinated by five oxygen atoms in a distorted trigonal bipyramidal structure. Hydrated zinc acetylacetonate can be obtained by combining zinc sulfate, acetylacetone, and sodium hydroxide.

== Structure ==
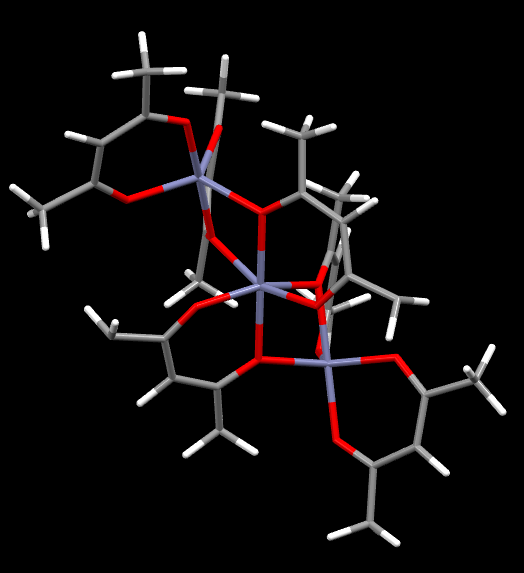
Structure of [Zn(acac)_{2}]_{3}.

Through sublimation, both monomeric and trimeric forms can be obtained. The monomer is monoclinic and have the space group C2/c (No. 15). Anhydrous zinc acetylacetonate also exists in the solid state as a trimer.

== Reactions ==
The anhydrous zinc acetylacetonate is Lewis acidic, giving 5- and 6-coordinate adducts of the formula Zn(acac)_{2}L and Zn(acac)_{2}L_{2}, respectively. The structures of its monohydrate and dihydrate are also known.

Thermal decomposition of zinc acetylacetonate gives zinc oxide, and is also a catalyst for organic synthesis.
