= Glycol ethers =

Class of chemical compounds

Ethylene glycol monomethyl ether, a glycol ether

Glycol ethers are a class of chemical compounds consisting of alkyl ethers that are based on glycols such as ethylene glycol or propylene glycol. They are commonly used as solvents in paints and cleaners. They have good solvent properties while having higher boiling points than the lower-molecular-weight ethers and alcohols.

== History ==
The name Cellosolve was registered in 1924 as a United States trademark by Carbide & Carbon Chemicals Corporation (a division of Union Carbide Corporation) for "Solvents for Gums, Resins, Cellulose Esters, and the Like". Ethyl Cellosolve, or simply Cellosolve, consists mainly of ethylene glycol monoethyl ether and was introduced as a lower-cost solvent alternative to ethyl lactate. Butyl Cellosolve (ethylene glycol monobutyl ether) was introduced in 1928, and Methyl Cellosolve (ethylene glycol monomethyl ether) in 1929.

== Types ==
Glycol ethers are designated E-series or P-series for those made from ethylene oxide or propylene oxide, respectively. Typically, E-series glycol ethers are found in pharmaceuticals, sunscreens, cosmetics, inks, dyes and water-based paints, while P-series glycol ethers are used in degreasers, cleaners, aerosol paints and adhesives. Both E- and P-series glycol ethers can be used as intermediates that undergo further chemical reactions, producing glycol diethers and glycol ether acetates. P-series glycol ethers are marketed as having lower toxicity than the E-series.

== Health impacts ==
Most glycol ethers are water-soluble, biodegradable and only a few are considered toxic.

In the early 1990s, studies found a higher than expected rates of human reproductive health issues in both males and females, such as elevated risk of miscarriages among women who worked in semiconductor plants as well as male gonadal changes such as testicular atrophy and sperm morphology changes, which was traced back to glycol ethers; in particular: ethylene glycol ethers (diethylene glycol dimethyl ether or ethylene glycol monoethyl ether acetate) used in the photoresist substances that coat semiconductors.

One study suggests that occupational exposure to glycol ethers is related to lowering the motility of the sperm and sperm count, a finding disputed by the chemical industry.

== Subclasses ==
=== Monoalkyl ethers ===
- Ethylene glycol monomethyl ether (2-methoxyethanol, CH_{3}OCH_{2}CH_{2}OH)
- Ethylene glycol monoethyl ether (2-ethoxyethanol, CH_{3}CH_{2}OCH_{2}CH_{2}OH)
- Ethylene glycol monopropyl ether (2-propoxyethanol, CH_{3}CH_{2}CH_{2}OCH_{2}CH_{2}OH)
- Ethylene glycol monoisopropyl ether (2-isopropoxyethanol, (CH_{3})_{2}CHOCH_{2}CH_{2}OH)
- Ethylene glycol monobutyl ether (2-butoxyethanol, CH_{3}CH_{2}CH_{2}CH_{2}OCH_{2}CH_{2}OH), a widely used solvent in paintings and surface coatings, cleaning products and inks
- Ethylene glycol monophenyl ether (2-phenoxyethanol, C_{6}H_{5}OCH_{2}CH_{2}OH)
- Ethylene glycol monobenzyl ether (2-benzyloxyethanol, C_{6}H_{5}CH_{2}OCH_{2}CH_{2}OH)
- Propylene glycol methyl ether, (1-methoxy-2-propanol, CH_{3}OCH_{2}CH(OH)CH_{3})
- Diethylene glycol monomethyl ether (2-(2-methoxyethoxy)ethanol, methyl carbitol, CH_{3}OCH_{2}CH_{2}OCH_{2}CH_{2}OH)
- Diethylene glycol monoethyl ether (2-(2-ethoxyethoxy)ethanol, carbitol cellosolve, CH_{3}CH_{2}OCH_{2}CH_{2}OCH_{2}CH_{2}OH)
- Diethylene glycol mono-n-butyl ether (2-(2-butoxyethoxy)ethanol, butyl carbitol, CH_{3}CH_{2}CH_{2}CH_{2}OCH_{2}CH_{2}OCH_{2}CH_{2}OH)
- Dipropyleneglycol methyl ether
- C12-15 pareth-12 a polyethylene glycol ether used as an emulsifier in cosmetics

=== Dialkyl ethers ===
- Ethylene glycol dimethyl ether (dimethoxyethane, monoglyme, CH_{3}OCH_{2}CH_{2}OCH_{3}), a higher boiling alternative to diethyl ether and THF, also used as a solvent for polysaccharides, a reagent in organometallic chemistry and in some electrolytes of lithium batteries
- Diethylene glycol dimethyl ether (1-Methoxy-2-(2-methoxyethoxy)ethane, diglyme, CH_{3}OCH_{2}CH_{2}OCH_{2}CH_{2}OCH_{3})
- Triethylene glycol dimethyl ether (2,5,8,11-Tetraoxadodecane, triglyme, CH_{3}OCH_{2}CH_{2}OCH_{2}CH_{2}OCH_{2}CH_{2}OCH_{3})
- Tetraethylene glycol dimethyl ether (2,5,8,11,14-Pentaoxapentadecane, tetraglyme, CH_{3}OCH_{2}CH_{2}OCH_{2}CH_{2}OCH_{2}CH_{2}OCH_{2}CH_{2}OCH_{3})
- Ethylene glycol diethyl ether (diethoxyethane, CH_{3}CH_{2}OCH_{2}CH_{2}OCH_{2}CH_{3})
- Ethylene glycol dibutyl ether (dibutoxyethane, CH_{3}CH_{2}CH_{2}CH_{2}OCH_{2}CH_{2}OCH_{2}CH_{2}CH_{2}CH_{3})

=== Esters ===
- Ethylene glycol methyl ether acetate (2-methoxyethyl acetate, CH_{3}OCH_{2}CH_{2}OCOCH_{3})
- Ethylene glycol monoethyl ether acetate (2-ethoxyethyl acetate, CH_{3}CH_{2}OCH_{2}CH_{2}OCOCH_{3})
- Ethylene glycol monobutyl ether acetate (2-butoxyethyl acetate, CH_{3}CH_{2}CH_{2}CH_{2}OCH_{2}CH_{2}OCOCH_{3})
- Propylene glycol methyl ether acetate (1-methoxy-2-propanol acetate)
