= N-Butyl glycidyl ether =

n-Butyl glycidyl ether

Names
- Preferred IUPAC name 2-(Butoxymethyl)oxirane
- Other names 1,2-Epoxy-3-butoxypropane; 2,3-Epoxypropyl butyl ether (Butoxymethyl)oxirane; 1-Butoxy-2,3-epoxypropane

Identifiers
CAS Number	2426-08-6
3D model (JSmol)	Interactive image
ChemSpider	16149
ECHA InfoCard	100.017.616
PubChem CID	17049
RTECS number	TX4200000
UNII	M03777A62S
UN number	1993
CompTox Dashboard (EPA)	DTXSID9024691
- InChI: InChI=1S/C7H14O2/c1-2-3-4-8-5-7-6-9-7/h7H,2-6H2,1H3 Key: YSUQLAYJZDEMOT-UHFFFAOYSA-N
- SMILES: CCCCOCC1CO1

Properties
Chemical formula	C_{7}H_{14}O_{2}
Molar mass	130.187 g·mol^{−1}
Appearance	Colorless liquid
Odor	Irritating
Density	0.91 g/cm^{3}
Boiling point	164 °C; 327 °F; 437 K
Solubility in water	2% (20 °C)
Vapor pressure	3 mmHg (25 °C)

Hazards
Flash point	130 °F
- Lethal dose or concentration (LD, LC)
LD_{50} (median dose)	260 mg/m^{3} (inhalation, mouse) 1030 ppm (inhalation, rat, 8 hours); 700 mg/kg (intraperitoneal, mouse); 1140 mg/kg (intraperitoneal, rat); 1530 mg/kg (oral, mouse); 1660 mg/kg (oral, rat); 2520 μL/kg (skin, rabbit) >2150 mg/kg (skin, rat); 2050 mg/kg (oral, rat)
LC_{50} (median concentration)	>3500 ppm (mouse, 4 hr) 1030 ppm (rat, 8 hr)
- NIOSH (US health exposure limits)
PEL (Permissible)	TWA 50 ppm (270 mg/m^{3})
REL (Recommended)	5.6 ppm (30 mg/m^{3}) [15 min]
IDLH (Immediate danger)	250 ppm
- Except where otherwise noted, data are given for materials in their standard state (at 25 °C [77 °F], 100 kPa). Infobox references

n-Butyl glycidyl ether is an industrial chemical used in adhesives, sealants, and as a paint or coating additive. It is principally used to reduce the viscosity of epoxy resin systems.

== Synthesis ==
n-Butyl alcohol and epichlorohydrin react to form a halohydrin. This is followed by a caustic dehydrochlorination, to form n-butyl glycidyl ether.

== Metabolism ==
n-Butyl glycidyl ether is metabolized renally to butoxyacetic acid, 3-butoxy-2-hydroxypropionic acid and 3-butoxy-2-acetylaminopropionic acid.

== Safety ==
Exposure to n-butyl glycidyl ether through inhalation, eye contact, or skin exposure can cause a cough, sore throat, eye and skin redness, and pain. It is flammable and reacts with strong oxidants, strong bases, strong acids, and amines.

== Uses ==
As an epoxy modifier it is classed as an epoxy reactive diluent. It is also used to synthesize other molecules. The use of the diluent does effect mechanical properties and microstructure of epoxy resins. It has been used to simultaneously increase cryogenic strength, ductility and impact resistance of epoxy resins.

== See also ==
- Bisphenol A diglycidyl ether
- O-Cresyl glycidyl ether
