= 2-(2-Ethoxyethoxy)ethanol =

Organic compound

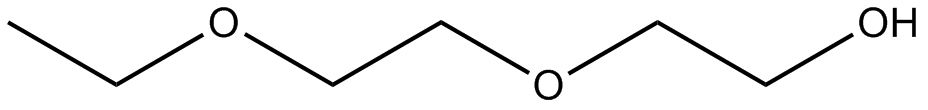

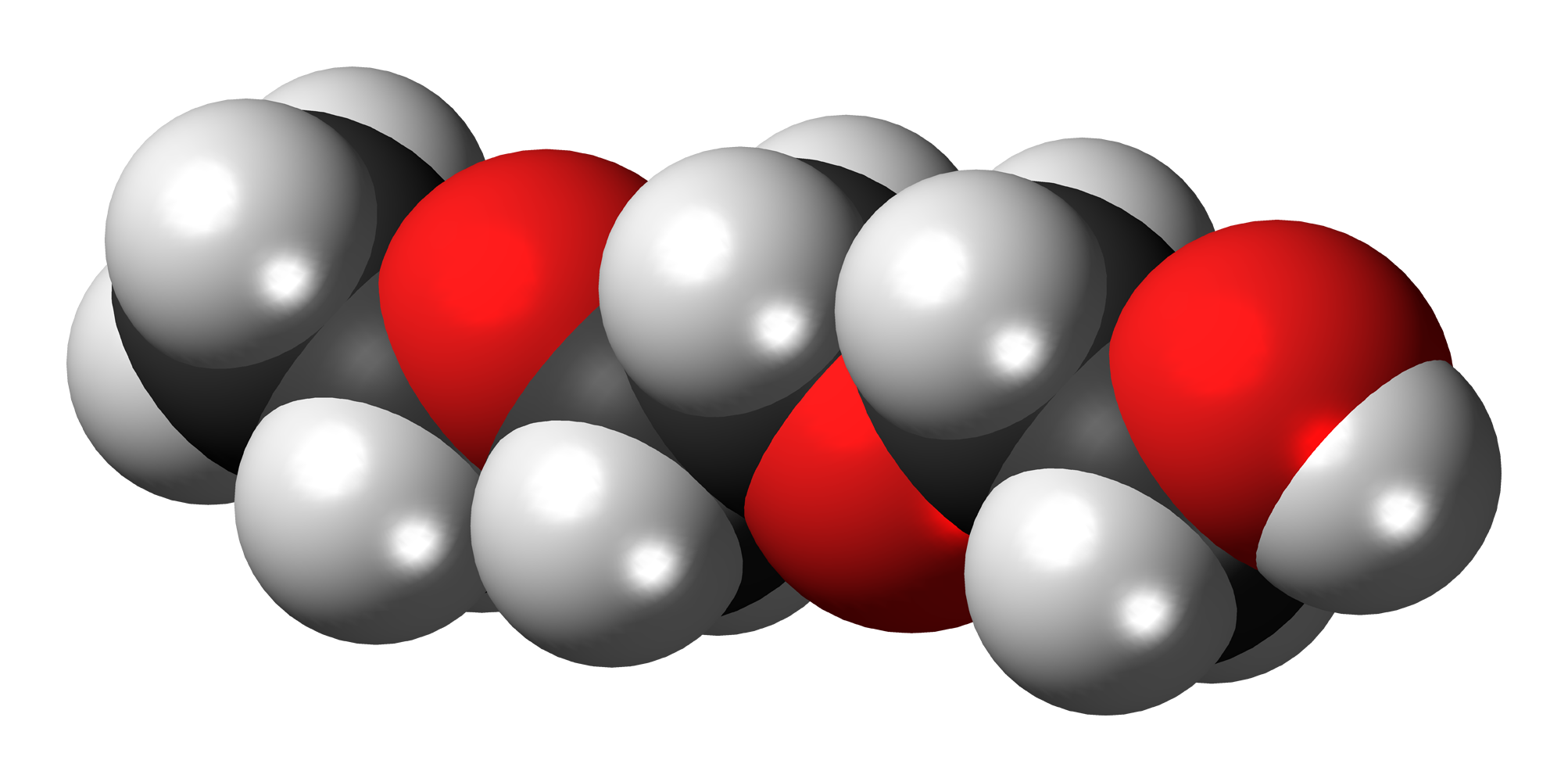

Names
- Preferred IUPAC name 2-(2-Ethoxyethoxy)ethan-1-ol
- Other names 3,6-dioxa-1-octanol, DEGEE, diethylene glycol monoethyl ether, ethoxydiglycol, Carbitol, Carbitol Cellosolve, Transcutol, Dioxitol, Polysolv DE, Dowanol DE

Identifiers
CAS Number	111-90-0
3D model (JSmol)	Interactive image; Interactive image
ChEBI	CHEBI:40572
ChEMBL	ChEMBL1230841
ChemSpider	13839107
ECHA InfoCard	100.003.563
KEGG	D08904
PubChem CID	8146
RTECS number	KK8750000
UNII	A1A1I8X02B
CompTox Dashboard (EPA)	DTXSID2021941
- InChI: InChI=1S/C6H14O3/c1-2-8-5-6-9-4-3-7/h7H,2-6H2,1H3 Key: XXJWXESWEXIICW-UHFFFAOYSA-N; InChI=1/C6H14O3/c1-2-8-5-6-9-4-3-7/h7H,2-6H2,1H3 Key: XXJWXESWEXIICW-UHFFFAOYAC
- SMILES: CCOCCOCCO; OCCOCCOCC

Properties
Chemical formula	C_{6}H_{14}O_{3}
Molar mass	134.175 g·mol^{−1}
Melting point	−76 °C (−105 °F; 197 K)
Boiling point	196 to 202 °C (385 to 396 °F; 469 to 475 K)

Hazards
Flash point	96 °C (205 °F; 369 K)
Autoignition temperature	204 °C (399 °F; 477 K)
Safety data sheet (SDS)	External MSDS
- Except where otherwise noted, data are given for materials in their standard state (at 25 °C [77 °F], 100 kPa). verify (what is ?) Infobox references

2-(2-Ethoxyethoxy)ethanol, also known as diethylene glycol monoethyl ether and under various trade names such as Transcutol and others, is the organic compound with the formula CH_{3}CH_{2}OCH_{2}CH_{2}OCH_{2}CH_{2}OH. It is a colorless liquid. It is a popular solvent for commercial applications. It is produced by the ethoxylation of ethanol (CH_{3}CH_{2}OH).

== Applications ==
It is a solvent for dyes, nitrocellulose, paints, inks, and resins. It is a component of wood stains for wood, for setting the twist and conditioning yarns and cloth, in textile printing, textile soaps, lacquers, penetration enhancer in cosmetics, drying varnishes and enamels, and brake fluids. It is used to determine the saponification values of oils and as a neutral solvent for mineral oil-soap and mineral oil-sulfated oil mixtures (giving fine dispersions in water).

It is also widely used as a solvent in a number of cosmetics and personal care products, including face cream, deodorant, makeup, hair dye, and sunless tanner.

== See also ==
- Cellosolve
- 2-Ethoxyethanol
