= Butoxyacetic acid =

Names
- IUPAC name 2-butoxyacetic acid

Identifiers
CAS Number	2516-93-0
3D model (JSmol)	Interactive image
ChEBI	CHEBI:173542
ChemSpider	38273
ECHA InfoCard	100.202.503
EC Number	677-364-8
PubChem CID	41958
CompTox Dashboard (EPA)	DTXSID0050392
- InChI: InChI=1S/C6H12O3/c1-2-3-4-9-5-6(7)8/h2-5H2,1H3,(H,7,8) Key: AJQOASGWDCBKCJ-UHFFFAOYSA-N
- SMILES: CCCCOCC(=O)O

Hazards
- GHS labelling
Pictograms	(GHS05: Corrosive)
Signal word	Warning
Hazard statements	H290, H314
Precautionary statements	P234, P260, P264, P264+P265, P280, P301+P330+P331, P302+P361+P354, P304+P340, P305+P354+P338, P316, P317, P321, P363, P390, P405, P501
- Except where otherwise noted, data are given for materials in their standard state (at 25 °C [77 °F], 100 kPa). Infobox references

Butoxyacetic acid is an aliphatic organic chemical. It is a liquid. It has the formula C_{6}H_{12}O_{3} and CAS Registry Number of 2516-93-0. It is REACH registered with the EC number 677-344-8. n-Butyl glycidyl ether is metabolized renally to this compound as is 2-butoxyethanol. Methods have been developed and papers published to detect the compound in urine and blood.

== Uses ==
It is mostly used as a biocide.
