= Diethylene glycol butyl ether =

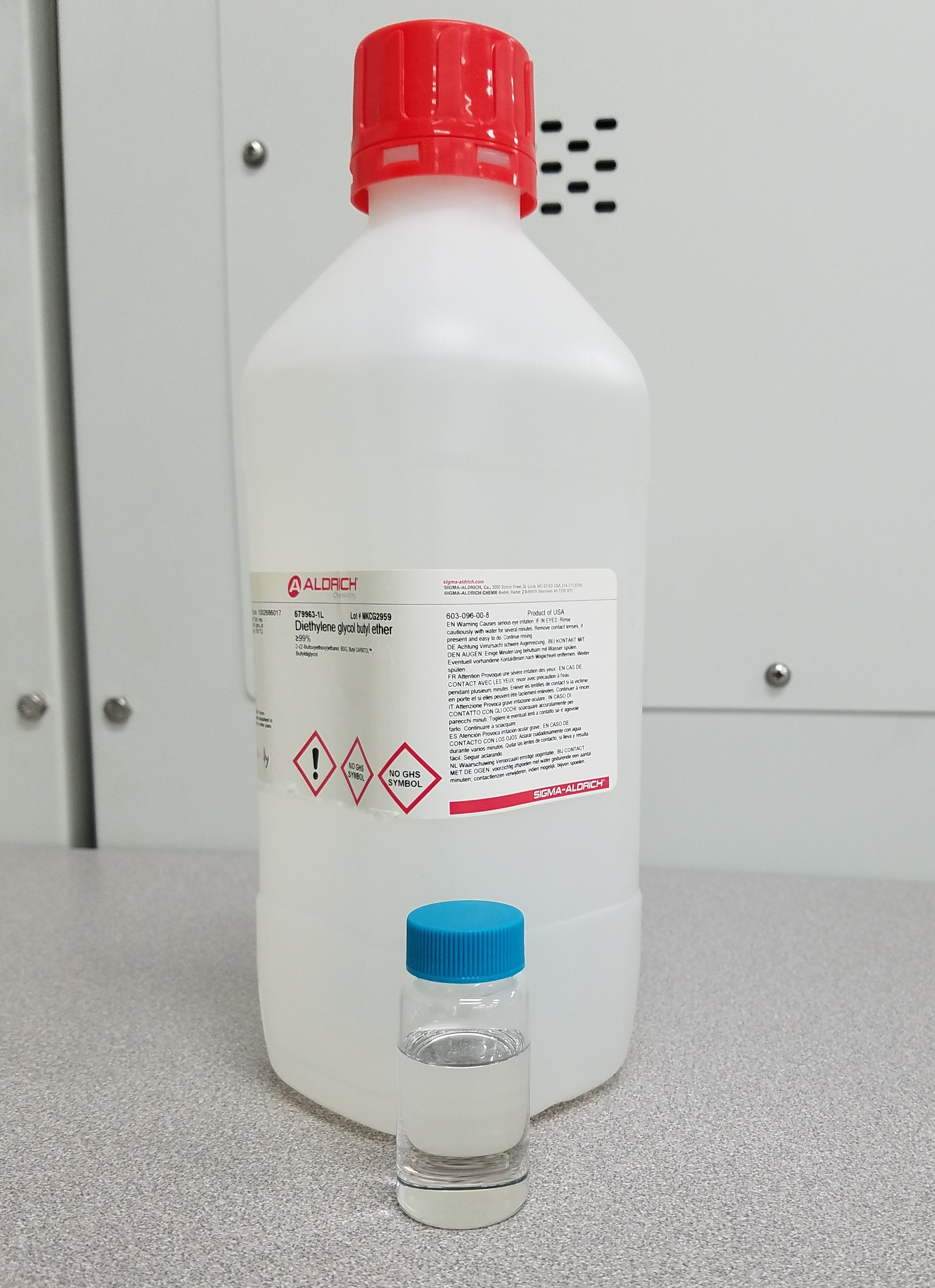

Names
- Preferred IUPAC name 2-(2-Butoxyethoxy)ethan-1-ol
- Other names 2-(2-Butoxyethoxy)ethanol; DEG monobutyl ether Butyldiglycol; Butyl carbitol Butyl digol BDGE

Identifiers
CAS Number	112-34-5
3D model (JSmol)	Interactive image
ChemSpider	13839549
PubChem CID	8177
UNII	9TB90IYC0E
- InChI: InChI=1S/C8H18O3/c1-2-3-5-10-7-8-11-6-4-9/h9H,2-8H2,1H3 Key: OAYXUHPQHDHDDZ-UHFFFAOYSA-N
- SMILES: CCCCOCCOCCO

Properties
Chemical formula	C_{8}H_{18}O_{3}
Molar mass	162.229 g·mol^{−1}
Appearance	Colorless liquid
Density	0.954 g/cm^{3}
Melting point	−68 °C (−90 °F; 205 K)
Boiling point	230 °C (446 °F; 503 K)
Solubility in water	Soluble in water, organic solvents

Hazards
NFPA 704 (fire diamond)	1 2 1
Flash point	78 °C (172 °F; 351 K)
Safety data sheet (SDS)	SDS
- Except where otherwise noted, data are given for materials in their standard state (at 25 °C [77 °F], 100 kPa). verify (what is ?) Infobox references

Diethylene glycol butyl ether (DEGBE, 2-(2-butoxyethoxy)ethanol, DEG monobutyl ether) is the organic compound with the formula C_{4}H_{9}OC_{2}H_{4}OC_{2}H_{4}OH. A colorless liquid, it is common industrial solvent. It is one of several glycol ether solvents. It has low odour and high boiling point. It is mainly used as a solvent for paints and varnishes in the chemical industry, household detergents, and textile processing.

== Production and use ==
Diethylene glycol monobutyl ether is produced from butanol by ethoxylation, the reaction with ethylene oxide in the presence of a basic catalyst.
