= Adipaldehyde =

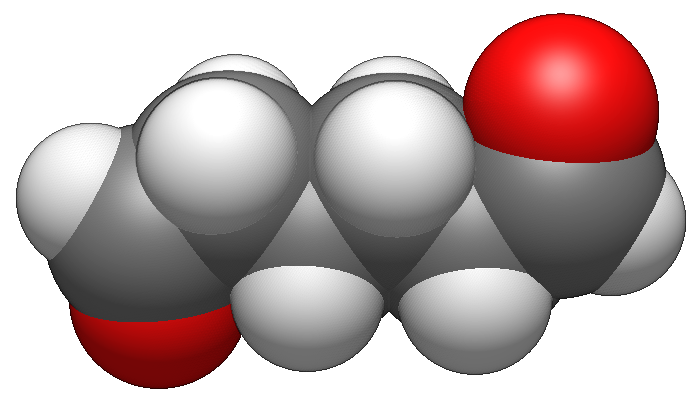

Names
- IUPAC name hexanedial
- Other names 1,4-Butane dicarboxaldehyde, 1,6-hexanedial

Identifiers
| CAS Number | 1072-21-5 |
| 3D model (JSmol) | Interactive image |
| ChEBI | CHEBI:180386 |
| ChemSpider | 63788 |
| ECHA InfoCard | 100.012.731 |
| EC Number | 214-003-1 |
| PubChem CID | 70620 |
| UNII | 6W2N7U6ZHE |
| CompTox Dashboard (EPA) | DTXSID10147935 |
- InChI: InChI=1S/C6H10O2/c7-5-3-1-2-4-6-8/h5-6H,1-4H2 Key: UMHJEEQLYBKSAN-UHFFFAOYSA-N
- SMILES: C(CCC=O)CC=O

Properties
| Chemical formula | C_{6}H_{10}O_{2} |
| Molar mass | 114.144 g·mol^{−1} |
| Appearance | colorless liquid |
| Density | 1.003 g/cm^{3} |
| Melting point | −8 °C (18 °F; 265 K) |
| Boiling point | 68–70 °C (154–158 °F; 341–343 K) 3 mm Hg |
- Except where otherwise noted, data are given for materials in their standard state (at 25 °C [77 °F], 100 kPa). Infobox references

Adipaldehyde is the organic compound with the formula (CH_{2})_{4}(CHO)_{2}. It is a colorless oil that is usually encountered as an aqueous solution because it is highly reactive like many dialdehydes. The compound has attracted interest as a precursor to nylon-related polymers. It can be produced by double hydroformylation of 1,3-butadiene, but this methodology has not achieved commercialization. It has been prepared by oxidation of 1,6-hexanediol with pyridinium chlorochromate.
