= 2-(2-Methoxyethoxy)ethanol =

Names
- Preferred IUPAC name 2-(2-Methoxyethoxy)ethan-1-ol
- Other names 2-(2-Methoxyethoxy)ethanol; 3,6-Dioxa-1-heptanol; Diethyleneglycol monomethyl ether Glycol Ether DM; DiEGME

Identifiers
CAS Number	111-77-3
3D model (JSmol)	Interactive image
ChEBI	CHEBI:44836
ChEMBL	ChEMBL1235250
ChemSpider	13839440
ECHA InfoCard	100.003.551
EC Number	203-906-6
PubChem CID	8134
RTECS number	KL6125000
UNII	465DDJ8G8K
UN number	2810
CompTox Dashboard (EPA)	DTXSID3025049
- InChI: InChI=1S/C5H12O3/c1-7-4-5-8-3-2-6/h6H,2-5H2,1H3 Key: SBASXUCJHJRPEV-UHFFFAOYSA-N; InChI=1/C5H12O3/c1-7-4-5-8-3-2-6/h6H,2-5H2,1H3 Key: SBASXUCJHJRPEV-UHFFFAOYAD
- SMILES: COCCOCCO

Properties
Chemical formula	C_{5}H_{12}O_{3}
Molar mass	120.148 g·mol^{−1}
Appearance	clear viscous liquid
Density	1.02
Melting point	−69 °C (−92 °F; 204 K)
Boiling point	194 °C (381 °F; 467 K)
Solubility in water	miscible

Hazards
- GHS labelling
Pictograms	(GHS08: Health hazard)
Signal word	Warning
Hazard statements	H361d
Precautionary statements	P201, P202, P281, P308+P313, P405, P501
NFPA 704 (fire diamond)	2 2 0
Flash point	96 °C (205 °F; 369 K)
Autoignition temperature	240 °C (464 °F; 513 K)
Safety data sheet (SDS)	External MSDS
- Except where otherwise noted, data are given for materials in their standard state (at 25 °C [77 °F], 100 kPa). Infobox references

2-(2-Methoxyethoxy)ethanol, also known under trade names Methyl carbitol, is an industrial solvent and is also commonly used as a fuel system icing inhibitor (FSII) in jet fuels. It is a clear, colorless, hygroscopic liquid. Structurally it is an alcohol and an ether, with a formula CH_{3}OCH_{2}CH_{2}OCH_{2}CH_{2}OH. At direct contact it causes drying of skin by leaching fats, and is mildly irritating to the eyes. It is flammable.

== See also ==
- Cellosolve
- 2-Ethoxyethanol
