= Barium acetylacetonate =

Names
- IUPAC name Bis(acetylacetonato)barium(II)
- Systematic IUPAC name Bis[(Z)-4-oxopent-2-en-2-olato-κ^{2}O,O′]barium(II)

Identifiers
CAS Number	12084-29-6
3D model (JSmol)	Interactive image
ChemSpider	4588876
ECHA InfoCard	100.031.944
EC Number	235-151-3
PubChem CID	5486157
- InChI: InChI=1S/2C5H8O2.Ba/c2*1-4(6)3-5(2)7;/h2*3,6H,1-2H3;/q;;+2/p-2/b2*4-3-; Key: DJHZYHWLGNJISM-FDGPNNRMSA-L
- SMILES: [Ba+2].O=C(/C=C(\[O-])C)C.[O-]\C(=C/C(=O)C)C

Properties
Chemical formula	C_{10}H_{14}BaO_{4}
Molar mass	335.545 g·mol^{−1}
Appearance	White solid

Hazards
- GHS labelling
Pictograms	(GHS07: Exclamation mark)
Signal word	Warning
Hazard statements	H302, H332
Precautionary statements	P261, P264, P270, P271, P301+P312, P304+P312, P304+P340, P312, P330, P501
- Except where otherwise noted, data are given for materials in their standard state (at 25 °C [77 °F], 100 kPa). Infobox references

Barium acetylacetonate is a compound with formula Ba(C_{5}H_{7}O_{2})_{2}. It is the Ba^{2+} complex of the anion acetylacetonate. The compound is typically encountered as an ill-defined hydrate, which would accord with the high coordination number characteristic of barium.

== Uses ==
Structure of gaseous barium acetylacetonate.

Barium acetylacetonate has been examined in metal organic chemical vapour deposition of BaTiO_{3} thin films. The related complex with hexafluoroacetylacetonate Ba(hfa)_{2}(tetraglyme) has also been investigated. Its formation of a sublimable adduct containing a polyether illustrates the high coordination numbers typical of barium.
