= Bis(2-methoxyethyl) phthalate =

Names
- IUPAC name Bis(2-methoxyethyl) phthalate
- Other names Di(2-methoxyethyl) phthalate

Identifiers
CAS Number	117-82-8
3D model (JSmol)	Interactive image
ChEMBL	ChEMBL1302251
ChemSpider	8041
ECHA InfoCard	100.003.830
EC Number	204-212-6
PubChem CID	8344
RTECS number	TI1400000
UNII	68W8XUO221
CompTox Dashboard (EPA)	DTXSID8025094
- InChI: InChI=1S/C14H18O6/c1-17-7-9-19-13(15)11-5-3-4-6-12(11)14(16)20-10-8-18-2/h3-6H,7-10H2,1-2H3 Key: HSUIVCLOAAJSRE-UHFFFAOYSA-N
- SMILES: COCCOC(=O)C1=CC=CC=C1C(=O)OCCOC

Properties
Chemical formula	C_{14}H_{18}O_{6}
Molar mass	282.292 g·mol^{−1}
Density	1.170 g/cm3
Melting point	−55 °C (−67 °F; 218 K)
Solubility in water	0.85% w/w

Hazards
- GHS labelling
Pictograms	(GHS08: Health hazard)
Hazard statements	H360FD
Precautionary statements	P201, P202, P280, P308+P313, P405, P501
Flash point	~200 °C
Autoignition temperature	390 °C (734 °F; 663 K)
Explosive limits	Lower explosion limit: 0.3 %
- Lethal dose or concentration (LD, LC)
LD_{50} (median dose)	Dermal - Rabbit - 19,800 mg/kg
- NIOSH (US health exposure limits)
PEL (Permissible)	10 mg/m3 STEL)
- Except where otherwise noted, data are given for materials in their standard state (at 25 °C [77 °F], 100 kPa). Infobox references

Bis(2-methoxyethyl) phthalate, also commonly di(2-methoxyethyl) phthalate (DMEP), is a phthalate ester baring 2-methoxyethanol groups. Historically it was used as a plasticizer in cellulose acetate plastics, it is now largely banned owing to concerns over its effects to human health.
