= Metalaxyl =

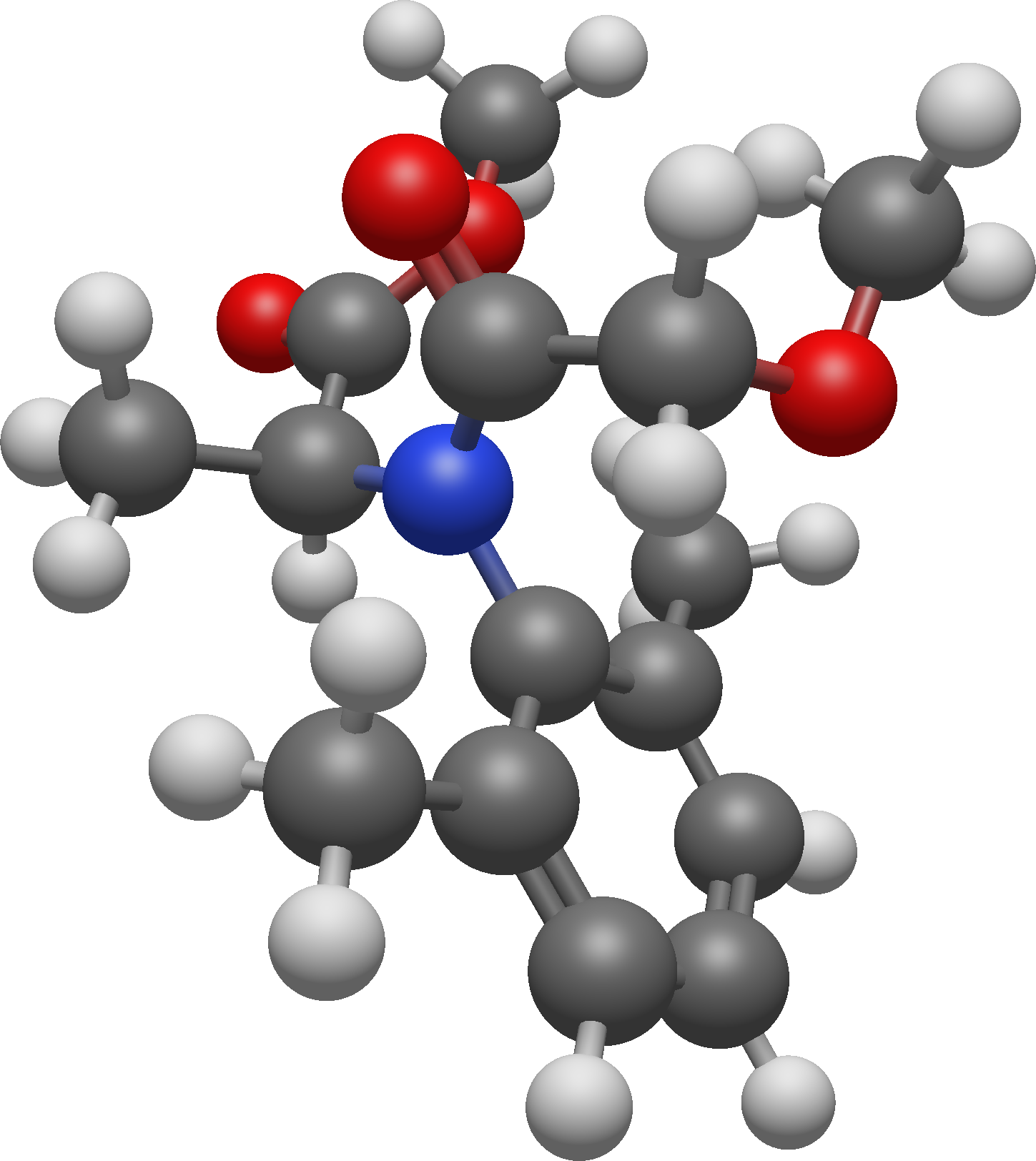

Names
- IUPAC name Methyl 2-[N-(2,6-dimethylphenyl)(methoxy)acetamido]propanoate
- Other names Methyl N-(2,6-dimethylphenyl)-N-(2-methoxyacetyl)alaninate

Identifiers
CAS Number	57837-19-1
3D model (JSmol)	Interactive image
ChEBI	CHEBI:6790
ChEMBL	ChEMBL105809
ChemSpider	38839
ECHA InfoCard	100.055.418
EC Number	260-979-7
KEGG	C10947
PubChem CID	42586
UNII	16K4M187IF
CompTox Dashboard (EPA)	DTXSID6024175
- InChI: InChI=1S/C15H21NO4/c1-10-7-6-8-11(2)14(10)16(13(17)9-19-4)12(3)15(18)20-5/h6-8,12H,9H2,1-5H3 Key: ZQEIXNIJLIKNTD-UHFFFAOYSA-N
- SMILES: COCC(=O)N(c1c(C)cccc1C)C(C)C(=O)OC

Properties
Chemical formula	C_{15}H_{21}NO_{4}
Molar mass	279.33 g/mol
Appearance	Fine white powder
Density	1.20g/cm^{3} at 20 °C
Melting point	71 to 72 °C (160 to 162 °F; 344 to 345 K)
Boiling point	295.9 °C (564.6 °F; 569.0 K) at 760 mm Hg
Solubility in water	8,400 mg/L at 22 °C
log P	1.65 (octanol/water)
- Except where otherwise noted, data are given for materials in their standard state (at 25 °C [77 °F], 100 kPa). Infobox references

Metalaxyl is an acylalanine fungicide with systemic function. Its chemical name is methyl N-(methoxyacetyl)-N-(2,6-xylyl)-DL-alaninate. It can be used to control Pythium in a number of vegetable crops, and Phytophthora in peas. Metalaxyl-M is the ISO common name and Ridomil Gold is the trade name for the optically pure (-) / D / R active stereoisomer, which is also known as mefenoxam.

It is the active ingredient in the seed treatment agent Apron XL LS.

The fungicide has suffered severe resistance problems. The fungicide was marketed for use against Phytophthora infestans. However, in the summer of 1980, in the Republic of Ireland, the crop was devastated by a potato blight epidemic after a resistant race of the oomycete appeared. Irish farmers later successfully sued the company for their losses. Maximum pesticide residue limits for the EU/UK are set at 0.5 mg/kg for oranges and 1.0 mg/kg for apples. As early as 1998 Pythium was known to be widely developing resistance to metalaxyl which was the most effective control at the time. Various Pythium populations have been known to have resistance to mefenoxam since the 1980s and metalaxyl since 1984. There is wide variability in resistance/sensitivity between Pythium species, with some populations showing complete ineffectiveness.

== Synthesis ==
The first synthesis of metalaxyl was disclosed in patents filed by Ciba Geigy.

2,6-Xylidine is alkylated with methyl 2-bromopropionate to give an alanine derivative. This is further reacted with the acid chloride of methoxyacetic acid to yield racemic metalaxyl. The homochiral, single-isomer version of the chemical, which retains all its fungicidal activity, has been manufactured.
