= Propylene glycol methyl ether acetate =

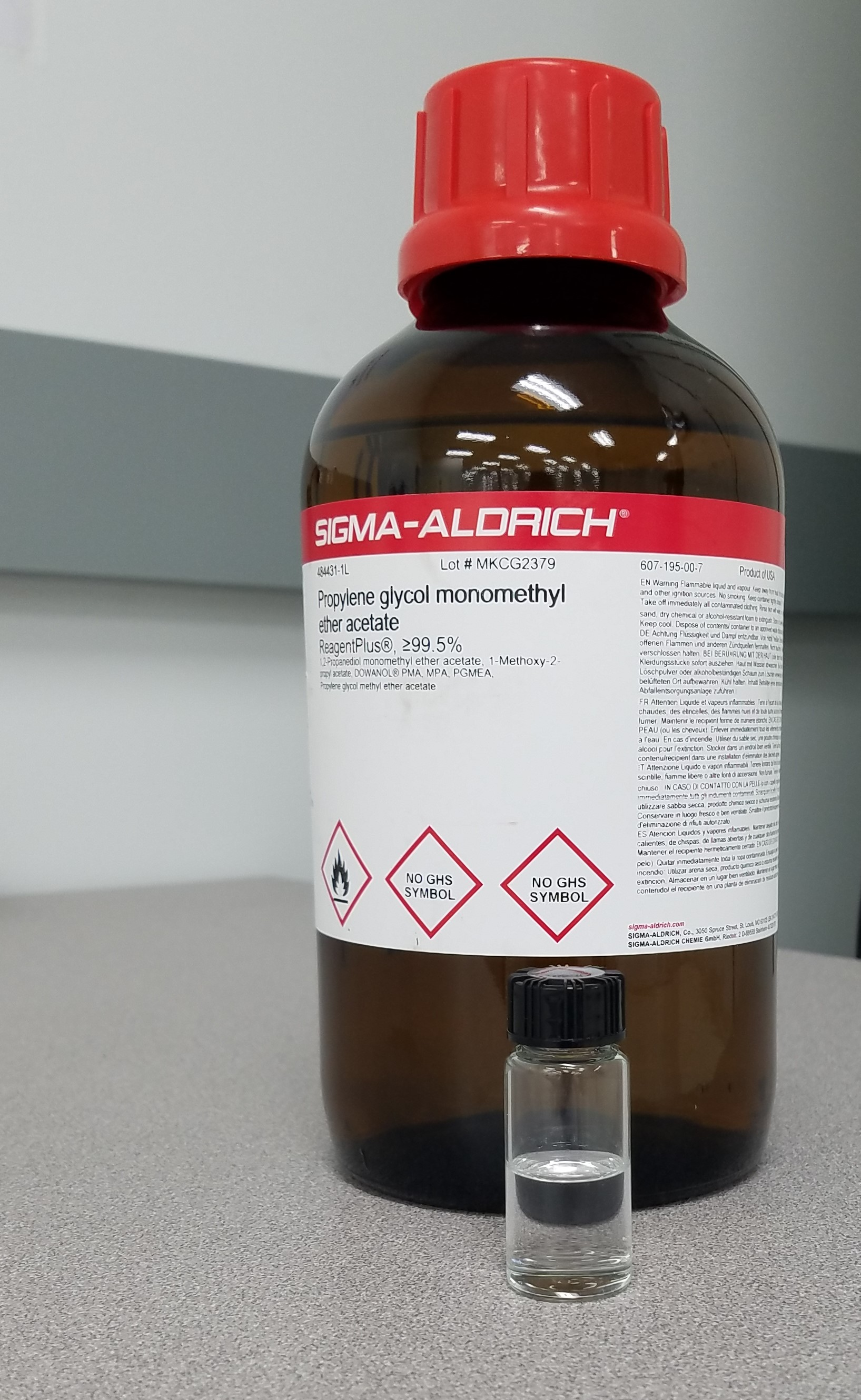

Names
- Preferred IUPAC name 1-Methoxypropan-2-yl acetate
- Other names PGMEA; 1-methoxy-2-propanyl acetate; PM Acetate; Propylene glycol monomethyl ether acetate

Identifiers
CAS Number	108-65-6
3D model (JSmol)	Interactive image
ChemSpider	7658
ECHA InfoCard	100.003.277
PubChem CID	7946
UNII	PA7O2U6S2Q
CompTox Dashboard (EPA)	DTXSID1026796
- InChI: InChI=1S/C6H12O3/c1-5(4-8-3)9-6(2)7/h5H,4H2,1-3H3 Key: LLHKCFNBLRBOGN-UHFFFAOYSA-N; InChI=1/C6H12O3/c1-5(4-8-3)9-6(2)7/h5H,4H2,1-3H3 Key: LLHKCFNBLRBOGN-UHFFFAOYAD
- SMILES: CC(COC)OC(=O)C

Properties
Chemical formula	C_{6}H_{12}O_{3}
Molar mass	132.159 g·mol^{−1}
Appearance	Colorless liquid
Density	0.962 g/cm^{3}
Melting point	−67 °C (−89 °F; 206 K)
Boiling point	146 °C (295 °F; 419 K)
Solubility in water	23.0g /100mL H_{2}O（25 °C)
log P	0.26

Hazards
- GHS labelling
Hazard statements	H226, H402
NFPA 704 (fire diamond)	1 2 0
Flash point	45 °C (113 °F; 318 K)
Autoignition temperature	333 °C (631 °F; 606 K)
Explosive limits	1.5% - 7%
- Except where otherwise noted, data are given for materials in their standard state (at 25 °C [77 °F], 100 kPa). Infobox references

Propylene glycol methyl ether acetate (PGMEA, 1-methoxy-2-propanol acetate) is a P-type glycol ether used in inks, coatings, and cleaners. It is sold by Dow Chemical under the name Dowanol PMA, by Shell Chemical under the name methyl proxitol acetate, and by Eastman under the name PM Acetate.

In the semiconductor industry, PGMEA is a commonly used solvent, primarily for the application of surface adherents such as bis(trimethylsilyl)amine (HMDS) on silicon wafers. The compound is often the most abundant airborne, molecular contamination (AMC) in semiconductor cleanrooms, due to its evaporation into ambient air.
