= Di(propylene glycol) methyl ether =

Names
- Other names Dipropylene glycol monomethyl ether; Dipropyleneglycol methyl ether; DPGME; DPM; (2-methoxymethylethoxy)propanol

Identifiers
CAS Number	34590-94-8 (mixture of isomers)
3D model (JSmol)	Interactive image
ChEMBL	ChEMBL3182921
ChemSpider	23783; 17215460
ECHA InfoCard	100.047.353
EC Number	252-104-2
PubChem CID	22833331
UNII	RQ1X8FMQ9N (mixture of isomers)
- InChI: InChI=1S/C7H16O3/c1-3-7(8)10-6-4-5-9-2/h7-8H,3-6H2,1-2H3 Key: SHRGCOIDGUJGJI-UHFFFAOYSA-N
- SMILES: CCC(O)OCCCOC

Properties
Chemical formula	C_{7}H_{16}O_{3}
Molar mass	148.202 g·mol^{−1}
Density	0.951 g/cm^{3}
Boiling point	190 °C (374 °F; 463 K)
Solubility in water	Miscible

Hazards
Flash point	75 °C (167 °F; 348 K)
- Except where otherwise noted, data are given for materials in their standard state (at 25 °C [77 °F], 100 kPa). Infobox references

Di(propylene glycol) methyl ether is an organic solvent with a variety of industrial and commercial uses. It finds use as a less volatile alternative to propylene glycol methyl ether and other glycol ethers. The commercial product is typically a mixture of four isomers.
