= C12-15 pareth-12 =

- n = 11-14, m = 12

Names
- Other names C_{12-15} pareth-12 Ethoxylated C12-15 alcohols

Identifiers
CAS Number	68131-39-5
UNII	131316X18L
- Except where otherwise noted, data are given for materials in their standard state (at 25 °C [77 °F], 100 kPa). Infobox references

C12-15 pareth-12 (INCI name) is an emulsifier and surfactant commonly used in cosmetics formulations. It is a polyethylene glycol ether formed by combining synthetic C_{12}–C_{15} fatty alcohols with 12 moles of ethylene oxide.

According to the INCI, "the term Pareth applies to ethoxylated paraffinic alcohols containing both even- and odd-carbon chain length fractions."
