= Propylene glycol methyl ether =

Names
- Preferred IUPAC name 1-Methoxypropan-2-ol
- Other names PGME; 1-Methoxy-2-propanol; Methoxypropanol α-Propylene glycol monomethyl ether Dowanol PM

Identifiers
CAS Number	107-98-2
3D model (JSmol)	Interactive image
ChemSpider	7612
ECHA InfoCard	100.003.218
PubChem CID	7900
UNII	74Z7JO8V3U
CompTox Dashboard (EPA)	DTXSID8024284
- InChI: InChI=1S/C4H10O2/c1-4(5)3-6-2/h4-5H,3H2,1-2H3 Key: ARXJGSRGQADJSQ-UHFFFAOYSA-N
- SMILES: CC(O)COC

Properties
Chemical formula	C_{4}H_{10}O_{2}
Molar mass	90.122 g·mol^{−1}
Appearance	Colorless liquid
Odor	Ethereal
Density	0.92 g/cm^{3} (20 °C)
Melting point	−97 °C (−143 °F; 176 K)
Boiling point	120 °C (248 °F; 393 K)
Solubility in water	Miscible
log P	−0.45

Hazards
Flash point	32 °C (90 °F; 305 K)
- Except where otherwise noted, data are given for materials in their standard state (at 25 °C [77 °F], 100 kPa). Infobox references

Propylene glycol methyl ether (PGME or 1-methoxy-2-propanol) is an organic solvent with a wide variety of industrial and commercial uses. Similar to other glycol ethers, it is used as a carrier/solvent in printing/writing inks and paints/coatings. It also finds use as an industrial and commercial paint stripper. It is used as an antifreeze in diesel engines.

== See also ==
- Di(propylene glycol) methyl ether
