= 1,6-Hexanediol =

Names
- Preferred IUPAC name Hexane-1,6-diol
- Other names Hexamethylene glycol; 1,6-Dihydroxyhexane; 1,6-Hexylene glycol; Hexamethylenediol; HDO

Identifiers
CAS Number	629-11-8
3D model (JSmol)	Interactive image
ChEBI	CHEBI:43078
ChEMBL	ChEMBL458616
ChemSpider	13839416
DrugBank	DB02210
ECHA InfoCard	100.010.068
EC Number	211-074-0
PubChem CID	12374
RTECS number	MO2100000
UNII	ZIA319275I
CompTox Dashboard (EPA)	DTXSID1027265
- InChI: InChI=1S/C6H14O2/c7-5-3-1-2-4-6-8/h7-8H,1-6H2 Key: XXMIOPMDWAUFGU-UHFFFAOYSA-N
- SMILES: OCCCCCCO

Properties
Chemical formula	C_{6}H_{14}O_{2}
Molar mass	118.176 g·mol^{−1}
Density	0.967
Melting point	42 °C (108 °F; 315 K)
Boiling point	250 °C (482 °F; 523 K)
Solubility in water	500g/L
Solubility	soluble in ethanol and acetone, slightly soluble in diethyl ether, insoluble in benzene.

Hazards
Flash point	102 °C (216 °F; 375 K)
- Except where otherwise noted, data are given for materials in their standard state (at 25 °C [77 °F], 100 kPa). verify (what is ?) Infobox references

1,6-Hexanediol is an organic compound with the formula (CH_{2}CH_{2}CH_{2}OH)_{2}. It is a primary alcohol, and appears as a colorless water-soluble solid.

== History and synthesis ==
W. H. Perkin Jr. and his graduate student Edward Haworth first prepared the compound in 1894 during their research on cyclohexane. They heated a suspension of 1,6-dibromohexane, (which they were also the first to synthesize) in dilute aqueous potassium carbonate solution. They named resulting colorless syrup hexamethylene glycol.

1,6-Hexanediol is industrially made by the hydrogenation of adipic acid or its esters. Laboratory preparation could be achieved by reduction of adipates with lithium aluminium hydride, although this method is impractical on a commercial scale.

== Properties ==
As 1,6-hexanediol contains hydroxyl groups, it undergoes the typical chemical reactions of alcohols such as dehydration, substitution, and esterification. Oxidation with pyridinium chlorochromate gives adipaldehyde.

Dehydration of 1,6-hexanediol gives oxepane, 2-methyltetrahydropyran and 2-ethyltetrahydrofuran. Corresponding thiophene and pyrrolidone can be made by reacting 1,6-hexanediol with hydrogen sulfide and ammonia respectively.

== Uses ==
1,6-Hexanediol is widely used for industrial polyester and polyurethane production.

1,6-Hexanediol can improve the hardness and flexibility of polyesters as it contains a fairly long hydrocarbon chain. In polyurethanes, it is used as a chain extender, and the resulting modified polyurethane has high resistance to hydrolysis as well as mechanical strength, but with a low glass transition temperature.

It is also an intermediate to acrylics as a crosslinking agent, e.g. hexanediol diacrylate. Unsaturated polyester resins have also been made from 1,6-hexanediol, along with styrene, maleic anhydride and fumaric acid.

=== Uses to study biomolecular condensates ===
1,6-Hexanediol has been used to characterize biomolecular condensates. The material properties of condensates can be examined to determine if they are solid or liquid condensates. 1,6-Hexanediol has been reported to interfere with weak hydrophobic protein-protein or protein-RNA interactions that comprise liquid condensates. 1,6-Hexanediol has been reported to dissolve liquid but not solid condensates. 2,5-Hexanediol and 1,4-butanediol have been observed to have minimal effect on behavior of disordered proteins as compared to 1,6-hexanediol.

== Safety ==
1,6-Hexanediol has low toxicity and low flammability, and is generally considered as safe. It is not irritating to skin, but may irritate the respiratory tract or mucous membranes. Dust or vapor of the compound can irritate or damage the eyes.
