= 2-Butoxyethanol =

Chemical compound

- 2-Butoxyethanol

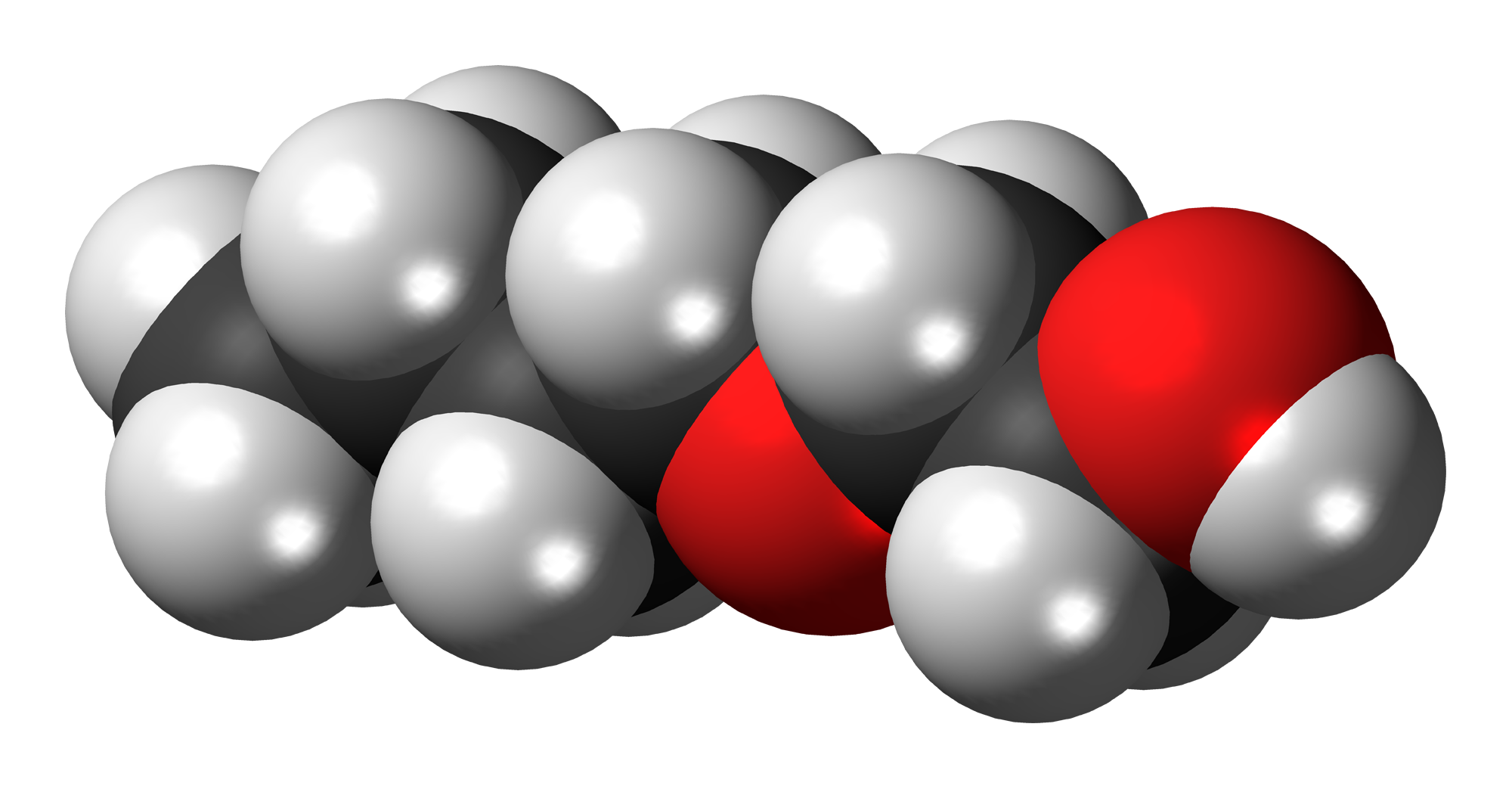

Names
- Preferred IUPAC name 2-Butoxyethan-1-ol
- Other names 2-Butoxyethanol; Butyl cellosolve Butyl glycol Butyl monoether glycol EGBE (ethylene glycol monobutyl ether); Dowanol EB; Eastman EB solvent 2-BE; EGMBE; Butyl oxitol Ektasolve EB; Jeffersol EB

Identifiers
CAS Number	111-76-2
3D model (JSmol)	Interactive image
ChEBI	CHEBI:63921
ChEMBL	ChEMBL284588
ChemSpider	13836399
ECHA InfoCard	100.003.550
EC Number	203-905-0
PubChem CID	8133
RTECS number	KJ8575000
UNII	I0P9XEZ9WV
UN number	1993, 2810, 2369
CompTox Dashboard (EPA)	DTXSID1024097
- InChI: InChI=1S/C6H14O2/c1-2-3-5-8-6-4-7/h7H,2-6H2,1H3 Key: POAOYUHQDCAZBD-UHFFFAOYSA-N; InChI=1/C6H14O2/c1-2-3-5-8-6-4-7/h7H,2-6H2,1H3 Key: POAOYUHQDCAZBD-UHFFFAOYAB
- SMILES: OCCOCCCC

Properties
Chemical formula	C_{6}H_{14}O_{2}
Molar mass	118.176 g·mol^{−1}
Appearance	Clear, colorless liquid
Density	0.90 g/cm^{3}, liquid
Melting point	−77 °C (−107 °F; 196 K)
Boiling point	171 °C (340 °F; 444 K)
Solubility in water	Miscible (and in most organic solvents)
Vapor pressure	0.8 mmHg
Acidity (pK_{a})	High pK_{a} for −OH group
Refractive index (n_{D})	1.4198 (20 °C)
Viscosity	2.9 cP at 25 °C (77 °F)
Dipole moment	2.08 D

Hazards
- GHS labelling
Pictograms	(GHS06: Toxic) (GHS07: Exclamation mark) (GHS08: Health hazard)
Signal word	Danger
Hazard statements	H227, H302, H311, H315, H319, H330, H336, H361, H370, H372
Precautionary statements	P201, P202, P210, P260, P264, P270, P271, P280, P281, P284, P301+P312, P302+P352, P304+P340, P305+P351+P338, P307+P311, P308+P313, P310, P312, P314, P320, P321, P330, P332+P313, P337+P313, P361, P362, P363, P370+P378, P403+P233, P403+P235, P405, P501
NFPA 704 (fire diamond)	2 2 0
Flash point	67 °C (153 °F; 340 K)
Autoignition temperature	245 °C (473 °F; 518 K)
Explosive limits	1.1–12.7%
- Lethal dose or concentration (LD, LC)
LD_{50} (median dose)	1230 mg/kg (mouse, oral); 470 mg/kg (rat, oral); 300 mg/kg (rabbit, oral); 1200 mg/kg (guinea pig, oral); 1480 mg/kg (rat, oral)
LC_{50} (median concentration)	450 ppm (rat, 4 h); 700 ppm (mouse, 7 h)
- NIOSH (US health exposure limits)
PEL (Permissible)	TWA 50 ppm (240 mg/m^{3}) [skin]
REL (Recommended)	TWA 5 ppm (24 mg/m^{3}) [skin]
IDLH (Immediate danger)	700 ppm
- Safety data sheet (SDS)

Related compounds
Related ethers	2-Methoxyethanol; 2-Ethoxyethanol
Related compounds	Ethylene glycol
- Except where otherwise noted, data are given for materials in their standard state (at 25 °C [77 °F], 100 kPa). verify (what is ?) Infobox references

2-Butoxyethanol is an organic compound with the chemical formula BuOC_{2}H_{4}OH (Bu = CH_{3}CH_{2}CH_{2}CH_{2}). This colorless liquid has a sweet, ether-like odor, as it derives from the family of glycol ethers, and is a butyl ether of ethylene glycol. As a relatively nonvolatile, inexpensive solvent, it is used in many domestic and industrial products because of its properties as a surfactant. It is a known respiratory irritant and can be acutely toxic, but animal studies have not found it to be mutagenic, and no studies suggest it is a human carcinogen. A study of 13 classroom air contaminants conducted in Portugal reported a statistically significant association with increased rates of nasal obstruction and a positive association below the level of statistical significance with a higher risk of obese asthma and increased body mass index.

== Properties ==
=== Miscibility with water ===
Miscibility of 2-butoxyethanol with water depends on temperature. Depending on the composition of the mixture, the two liquids are partially miscible. This mixture shows both a lower and an upper critical solution temperature: below around 49 °C (lower critical solution temperature), the liquids are completely miscible. The same is true for temperatures above around 130 °C (upper critical solution temperature). Between these temperatures, however, the liquids do not mix in all proportions and two phases might appear, each of which is formed by various ratios of the two liquids.

== Production ==
2-Butoxyethanol is commonly obtained through two processes; the ethoxylation reaction of butanol and ethylene oxide in the presence of a catalyst:

C_{2}H_{4}O + C_{4}H_{9}OH → C_{4}H_{9}OC_{2}H_{4}OH

or the etherification of butanol with 2-chloroethanol. 2-Butoxyethanol can be obtained in the laboratory by performing a ring opening of 2-propyl-1,3-dioxolane with boron trichloride. It is often produced industrially by combining ethylene glycol and butyraldehyde in a Parr reactor with palladium on carbon.

In 2006, the European production of butyl glycol ethers amounted to 181 kilotons, of which approximately 50% (90 kt/a) was 2-butoxyethanol. World production is estimated to be 200 to 500 kt/a, of which 75% is for paints and coatings and 18% for metal cleaners and household cleaners. In the US, it is considered a high production volume chemical because more than 100 million pounds of this chemical are produced per year.

== Uses ==
2-Butoxyethanol is a glycol ether with modest surfactant properties, which can also be used as a mutual solvent (soluble in both water and oil).

=== Commercial uses ===
2-Butoxyethanol is a solvent for paints and surface coatings, as well as cleaning products and inks. Products that contain 2-butoxyethanol include acrylic resin formulations, asphalt release agents, firefighting foam, leather protectors, oil spill dispersants, degreaser applications, photographic strip solutions, whiteboard and glass cleaners, liquid soaps, cosmetics, dry cleaning solutions, lacquers, varnishes, herbicides, latex paints, enamels, printing paste, varnish removers, and silicone caulk. Products containing this compound are commonly found at construction sites, automobile repair shops, print shops, and facilities that produce sterilizing and cleaning products. It is the main ingredient of many home, commercial and industrial cleaning solutions. Since the molecule has both polar and non-polar ends, 2-butoxyethanol is useful for removing both polar and non-polar substances, like grease and oils. It is also approved by the U.S. FDA to be used as direct and indirect food additives, which include antimicrobial agents, defoamers, stabilizers, and adhesives.

=== In the petroleum industry ===
2-Butoxyethanol is commonly produced for the oil industry because of its surfactant properties.

In the petroleum industry, 2-butoxyethanol is a component of fracturing fluids, drilling stabilizers, and oil slick dispersants for both water-based and oil-based hydraulic fracturing. When liquid is pumped into the well, the fracturing fluids are pumped under extreme pressure, so 2-butoxyethanol is used to stabilize them by lowering the surface tension. As a surfactant, 2-butoxyethanol absorbs at the oil-water interface of the fracture. The compound is also used to facilitate the release of the gas by preventing congealing. It is also used as a crude oil–water coupling solvent for more general oil well workovers. Because of its surfactant properties, it is a major constituent (30–60% w/w) in the oil spill dispersant Corexit 9527, which was widely used in the aftermath of the 2010 Deepwater Horizon oil spill.

== Safety ==
2-Butoxyethanol has a low acute toxicity, with LD_{50} of 2.5 g/kg in rats. Laboratory tests by the U.S. National Toxicology Program have shown that only sustained exposure to high concentrations (100–500 ppm) of 2-butoxyethanol can cause adrenal tumors in animals. American Conference of Governmental Industrial Hygienists (ACGIH) reports that 2-butoxyethanol is carcinogenic in rodents. These rodent tests may not directly translate to carcinogenicity in humans, as the observed mechanism of cancer involves the rodents' forestomach, which humans lack. OSHA does not regulate 2-butoxyethanol as a carcinogen. 2-Butoxyethanol has not been shown to penetrate shale rock in a study conducted by Manz.

=== Disposal and degradation ===
2-Butoxyethanol can be disposed of by incineration. It was shown that disposal occurs faster in the presence of semiconductor particles. 2-Butoxyethanol usually decomposes in the presence of air within a few days by reacting with oxygen radicals. It has not been identified as a major environmental contaminant, nor is it known to bio-accumulate. 2-Butoxyethanol biodegrades in soils and water, with a half life of 1–4 weeks in aquatic environments.

=== Human exposure ===
2-Butoxyethanol most commonly enters the human body system through dermal absorption, inhalation, or oral consumption of the chemical. The ACGIH threshold limit value (TLV) for worker exposure is 20 ppm, which is well above the odor detection threshold of 0.4 ppm. Blood or urine concentrations of 2-butoxyethanol or the metabolite 2-butoxyacetic acid may be measured using chromatographic techniques. A biological exposure index of 200 mg 2-butoxyacetic acid per g creatinine has been established in an end-of-shift urine specimen for U.S. employees. 2-Butoxyethanol and its metabolites fall to undetectable levels in urine after about 30 hours in men.

=== Animal studies ===
Harmful effects have been observed in nonhuman mammals exposed to high levels of 2-butoxyethanol. Developmental effects were seen in a study that exposed pregnant Fischer 344 rats, a type of laboratory rat, and New Zealand white rabbits to varying doses of 2-butoxyethanol. At 100 ppm (483 mg/m^{3}) and 200 ppm (966 mg/m^{3}) exposure, statistically significant increases were observed in the number of litters with skeletal defects. Additionally, 2-butoxyethanol was associated with a significant decrease in maternal body weight, uterine weight, and number of total implants. 2-Butoxyethanol is metabolized in mammals by the enzyme alcohol dehydrogenase.

Neurological effects have also been observed in animals exposed to 2-butoxyethanol. Fischer 344 rats exposed to 2-butoxyethanol at concentrations of 523 ppm and 867 ppm experienced decreased coordination. Male rabbits showed a loss of coordination and equilibrium after exposure to 400 ppm of 2-butoxyethanol for two days.

When exposed to 2-butoxyethanol in drinking water, both F344/N rats and B63F1 mice showed negative effects. The range of exposure for the two species was between 70 mg/kg body weight per day to 1300 mg/kg body weight per day. Decreased body weight and water consumption were seen for both species. Rats had reduced red blood cell counts and thymus weights, as well as lesions in the liver, spleen, and bone marrow.

=== Regulation in Canada ===
Environment and Health Canada recommended that 2-butoxyethanol be added to Schedule 1 of the Canadian Environmental Protection Act, 1999 (CEPA). Under these regulations, products containing 2-butoxyethanol are to be diluted below a certain concentration. Only those in which the user performs the required dilution are required to include it on labelling information.

=== Regulation in the US ===
2-Butoxyethanol is listed in California as a hazardous substance and the state sets an 8 hour average airborne concentration exposure limit at 25 ppm, and in California employers are required to inform employees when they are working with it.

2-Butoxyethanol is prohibited from use as a chemical additive in hydraulic fracturing fluids (Rule 437, Table 437-1) in Colorado where all chemicals used in downhole operations are required to be disclosed (§34-60-132 C.R.S.) to the Energy and Carbon Management Commission.

It is approved by the Food and Drug Administration as "an indirect and direct food additive for use as an antimicrobial agent, defoamer, stabilizer and component of adhesives", and also "may be used to wash or assist in the peeling of fruits and vegetables" and "may be safely used as components of articles intended for use in packaging, transporting & holding food". After its deletion from a UN list of substances requiring special toxicity labeling in 1994, and a subsequent petition by the American Chemistry Council, 2-butoxyethanol was removed from the U.S. Environmental Protection Agency's list of hazardous air pollutants in 2004. The safety of products containing 2-butoxyethanol as normally used is defended by the industry trade groups the American Chemistry Council and the Soap and Detergent Association.
