= 2-Hydroxyisocaproic acid =

Names
- Preferred IUPAC name 2-Hydroxy-4-methylpentanoic acid
- Other names 2-Hydroxy-4-methylvaleric acid

Identifiers
CAS Number	498-36-2
3D model (JSmol)	Interactive image
ChemSpider	83753
ECHA InfoCard	100.007.147
PubChem CID	92779
UNII	8RN4NSX3TY
CompTox Dashboard (EPA)	DTXSID80862047
- InChI: InChI=1S/C6H12O3/c1-4(2)3-5(7)6(8)9/h4-5,7H,3H2,1-2H3,(H,8,9) Key: LVRFTAZAXQPQHI-UHFFFAOYSA-N; InChI=1/C6H12O3/c1-4(2)3-5(7)6(8)9/h4-5,7H,3H2,1-2H3,(H,8,9) Key: LVRFTAZAXQPQHI-UHFFFAOYAQ
- SMILES: CC(C)CC(C(=O)O)O

Properties
Chemical formula	C_{6}H_{12}O_{3}
Molar mass	132.159 g·mol^{−1}
- Except where otherwise noted, data are given for materials in their standard state (at 25 °C [77 °F], 100 kPa). Infobox references

2-Hydroxyisocaproic acid (HICA or leucic acid) is a metabolite of the branched-chain amino acid leucine. It is commonly sold as a purported muscle building supplement. It also has fungicidal properties. HICA was shown to increase protein synthesis and muscle mass in rats who were recovering from a period of induced atrophy.

HICA is also produced by several protozoans it has been reported to show anti- inflammatory activities.
