= O-Cresyl glycidyl ether =

o-Cresyl glycidyl ether

Names
- IUPAC name 2-[(2-Methylphenoxy)methyl]oxirane
- Other names ortho-Cresyl glycidyl ether; o-CGE; Glycidyl 2-methylphenyl ether

Identifiers
CAS Number	2210-79-9
3D model (JSmol)	Interactive image
ChemSpider	15777
ECHA InfoCard	100.016.951
EC Number	218-645-3
PubChem CID	16640
RTECS number	TZ3700000
UNII	8Z744RD471
UN number	3334
CompTox Dashboard (EPA)	DTXSID8024862
- InChI: InChI=1S/C10H12O2/c1-8-4-2-3-5-10(8)12-7-9-6-11-9/h2-5,9H,6-7H2,1H3 Key: KFUSXMDYOPXKKT-UHFFFAOYSA-N
- SMILES: CC1=CC=CC=C1OCC2CO2

Properties
Chemical formula	C_{10}H_{12}O_{2}
Molar mass	164.204 g·mol^{−1}

Hazards
- GHS labelling
Pictograms	(GHS07: Exclamation mark) (GHS08: Health hazard) (GHS09: Environmental hazard)
Signal word	Warning
Hazard statements	H315, H317, H341, H411
Precautionary statements	P201, P202, P261, P264, P272, P273, P280, P281, P302+P352, P308+P313, P321, P332+P313, P333+P313, P362, P363, P391, P405, P501
- Except where otherwise noted, data are given for materials in their standard state (at 25 °C [77 °F], 100 kPa). Infobox references

o-Cresyl glycidyl ether (ortho-cresyl glycidyl ether, o-CGE) is a liquid aromatic organic chemical compound and chemically a glycidyl ether. It has the formula C_{10}H_{12}O_{2} and the CAS Registry Number 2210-79-9. It is one of a number of glycidyl ethers available commercially that are used to reduce the viscosity of epoxy resins. These are then further used in coatings, sealants, adhesives, composites and elastomers.

== Uses ==
The main use of o-CGE is to reduce the viscosity of epoxy resins. These reduced viscosity resins may then be used to formulate coatings including UV cured versions. It is a monofunctional diluent and so in polymer science terms is a chain terminator. Chain extenders (f = 2) and cross linkers (f ≥ 3) are low molecular weight di or tri-functional epoxy diluents. The use of the diluent does effect mechanical properties and microstructure of epoxy resins. As it has glycidyl functionality, it is classed as a Reactive diluent.

== Other names ==
o-CGE is known by a number of other names. These include:

- Oxirane, 2-[(2-methylphenoxy)methyl]-
- Propane, 1,2-epoxy-3-(o-tolyloxy)-
- Oxirane, [(2-methylphenoxy)methyl]-
- 2-[(2-Methylphenoxy)methyl]oxirane
- 1-(o-Methylphenoxy)-2,3-epoxypropane

== Toxicology ==
The material is a skin irritant and skin sensitizer. The toxicology has been reasonably well studied. It is REACH registered and produced or imported into the European Union in quantities greater than one thousand tonnes per annum.

== See also ==
- Epoxide
- Glycidol

== External Websites ==
- Hexion HELOXY™ 62 | Miller-Stephenson
- RoyOxy® RAD 100 O-cresyl Glycidyl Ether
- PARCHEM o-CGE
