= Diethylene glycol diethyl ether =

Names
- Preferred IUPAC name 1-Ethoxy-2-(2-ethoxyethoxy)ethane
- Other names Diethyl carbitol Bis(2-ethoxyethyl) ether Ethyl diglyme Diethyldiethylene glycol 3,6,9-Trioxaundecane; Diethyldiglycol

Identifiers
CAS Number	112-36-7
3D model (JSmol)	Interactive image
ChEBI	CHEBI:44664
ChemSpider	21106583
ECHA InfoCard	100.003.603
PubChem CID	8179
UNII	ZH086O935Z
CompTox Dashboard (EPA)	DTXSID3025047
- InChI: InChI=1S/C8H18O3/c1-3-9-5-7-11-8-6-10-4-2/h3-8H2,1-2H3 Key: RRQYJINTUHWNHW-UHFFFAOYSA-N
- SMILES: CCOCCOCCOCC

Properties
Chemical formula	C_{8}H_{18}O_{3}
Molar mass	162.22 g/mol
Appearance	colorless liquid
Density	0.9021 g/cm^{3}
Melting point	−47.7 °C (−53.9 °F; 225.5 K)
Boiling point	188 °C (370 °F; 461 K)
Solubility in water	very soluble
Solubility	very soluble in ethanol, organic solvents soluble in ethyl ether
log P	0.39
Vapor pressure	0.520 mmHg
Refractive index (n_{D})	1.40962
Viscosity	1.238 mPa·s

Hazards
- GHS labelling
Pictograms	(GHS07: Exclamation mark)
Signal word	Warning
Hazard statements	H315, H319
Precautionary statements	P264, P264+P265, P280, P302+P352, P305+P351+P338, P321, P332+P317, P337+P317, P362+P364
Flash point	82 °C (180 °F; 355 K)
Autoignition temperature	205 °C (401 °F; 478 K)

Related compounds
Related compounds	Diethylene glycol dimethyl ether; Diethylene glycol
- Except where otherwise noted, data are given for materials in their standard state (at 25 °C [77 °F], 100 kPa). Infobox references

Diethylene glycol diethyl ether (DEGDEE) is an organic solvent with a high boiling point. It is commonly used as an electrolyte for lithium-ion batteries.
