= 1-Chloropentane =

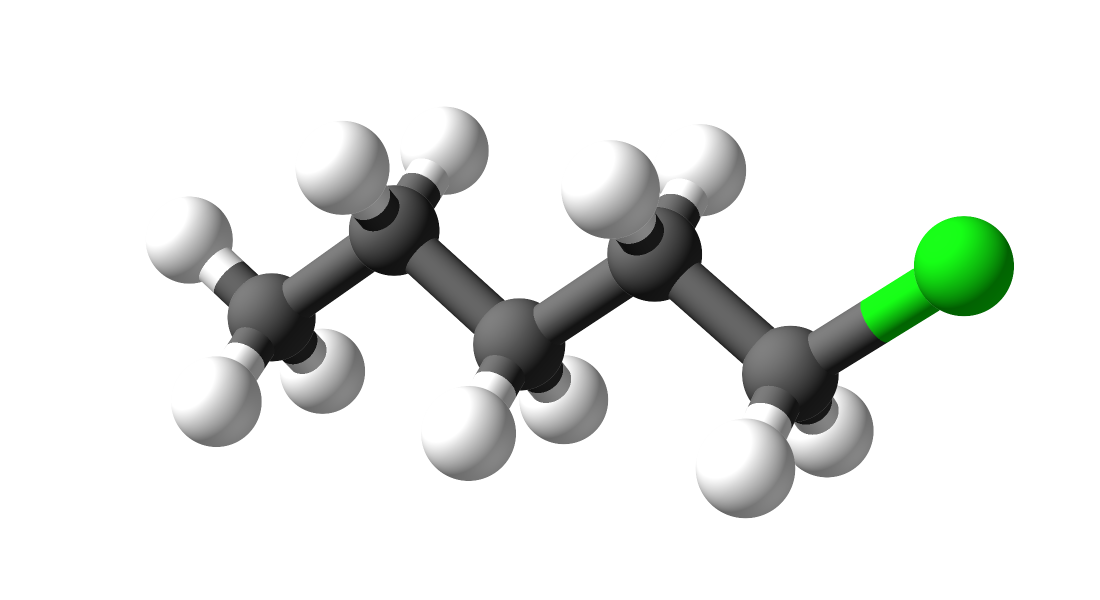

Names
- Preferred IUPAC name 1-Chloropentane
- Other names n-Pentyl chloride; n-Amyl chloride

Identifiers
CAS Number	543-59-9
3D model (JSmol)	Interactive image
Abbreviations	1-CP; PeCl n-PeCl nPeCl^{n}PeCl; AmCl n-AmCl nAmCl^{n}AmCl
ChEMBL	ChEMBL348039
ChemSpider	10512
ECHA InfoCard	100.008.043
PubChem CID	10977
UNII	0EG9MSD3NK
CompTox Dashboard (EPA)	DTXSID40870603
- InChI: InChI=1S/C5H11Cl/c1-2-3-4-5-6/h2-5H2,1H3 Key: SQCZQTSHSZLZIQ-UHFFFAOYSA-N
- SMILES: CCCCCCl

Properties
Chemical formula	C_{5}H_{11}Cl
Molar mass	106.59 g·mol^{−1}
Appearance	Liquid
Density	0.88 g/cm^{3}
Melting point	−99 °C (−146 °F; 174 K)
Boiling point	108 °C (226 °F; 381 K)
Solubility in water	197 mg/L

Hazards
Flash point	3 °C (37 °F; 276 K)
- Except where otherwise noted, data are given for materials in their standard state (at 25 °C [77 °F], 100 kPa). verify (what is ?) Infobox references

1-Chloropentane is an alkyl halide with the chemical formula CH_{3}(CH_{2})_{4}Cl. It is a colorless, flammable liquid. It can be prepared from 1-pentanol by treatment with hydrogen chloride.

== See also ==
- tert-Amyl chloride
