= 2-Ethoxyethyl acetate =

Names
- Preferred IUPAC name 2-Ethoxyethyl acetate
- Other names Ethyglycol acetate; Ethylene glycol mono ethyl ether acetate; 2-EEA; Ethoxyethanol acetate; EGA; Cellosolve acetate; Ethoxol acetate; Oxidol acetate

Identifiers
CAS Number	111-15-9
3D model (JSmol)	Interactive image
ChemSpider	13839109
ECHA InfoCard	100.003.491
EC Number	203-839-2
PubChem CID	8095
RTECS number	KK8225000
UNII	DG1O0Z7390
UN number	1172
CompTox Dashboard (EPA)	DTXSID9021928
- InChI: InChI=1S/C6H12O3/c1-3-8-4-5-9-6(2)7/h3-5H2,1-2H3 Key: SVONRAPFKPVNKG-UHFFFAOYSA-N
- SMILES: CCOCCOC(=O)C

Properties
Chemical formula	C_{6}H_{12}O_{3}
Molar mass	132.159 g·mol^{−1}
Density	0.973 (20 °C)
Melting point	< −62 °C
Boiling point	156 °C (313 °F; 429 K)
Solubility in water	229 g/L (20 °C)
Vapor pressure	270 Pa (20 °C)

Hazards
- GHS labelling
Pictograms	(GHS02: Flammable) (GHS07: Exclamation mark) (GHS08: Health hazard)
Signal word	Danger
Hazard statements	H226, H302, H312, H332, H360
Precautionary statements	P201, P280, P308, P313
Flash point	51 °C (124 °F; 324 K)
Autoignition temperature	380 °C (716 °F; 653 K)
- Except where otherwise noted, data are given for materials in their standard state (at 25 °C [77 °F], 100 kPa). Infobox references

2-Ethoxyethyl acetate is an organic compound with the formula CH_{3}CH_{2}OCH_{2}CH_{2}O_{2}CCH_{3}. It is the ester of ethoxyethanol and acetic acid. A colorless liquid, it is partially soluble in water.

== Properties ==
2-Ethoxyethyl acetate is a liquid at room temperature that is used as a solvent. It can be absorbed through inhalation, ingestion, and dermally and should be avoided. It may form an explosive mixture with air. It is also incompatible with strong acids, strong alkalis and nitrates. It may form unstable peroxides and it can soften many plastics, attack plastics, rubber and coatings.

== Uses ==
2-Ethoxyethyl acetate has been used to dissolve polyester and short oil alkyd resins. It has also been used in coatings, dyes, insecticides, soaps and cosmetics. It is also a solvent for nitro-cellulose and is being used for the same applications as ethyl glycol

In automobile lacquers it has been used to reduce evaporation and to impart a high gloss.

== Metabolism ==
2-Ethoxyethyl acetate is rapidly metabolized to 2-ethoxyethanol in the blood via hydrolysis. Then, 2-ethoxyethanol is metabolized, mainly by alcohol dehydrogenase, to 2-ethoxyacetaldehyde, which is further metabolized by aldehyde dehydrogenase to 2-ethoxyacetic acid (2-EAA) in the liver. These two compounds are the likely active metabolites, which are thought to be involved in some of the toxic effects. Also in the liver, ethylene glycol is produced. All this reactions belong to the phase I of the biotransformation process. In rats, EAA can be conjugated with glycine or may suffer O-deethylated. After this, it can be metabolized to carbon dioxide. An extra pathway in these animals involves microsomal P450 mixed function oxidases, with deethylation producing acetaldehyde and ethylene glycol.

== Safety ==
2-Ethoxyethyl acetate can cause a slight skin and eye irritation after exposure. High exposure can lead to kidney damage and paralysis. In animals, reproductive and teratogenic effects have been observed.
