= Tert-Amyl chloride =

tert-Amyl chloride

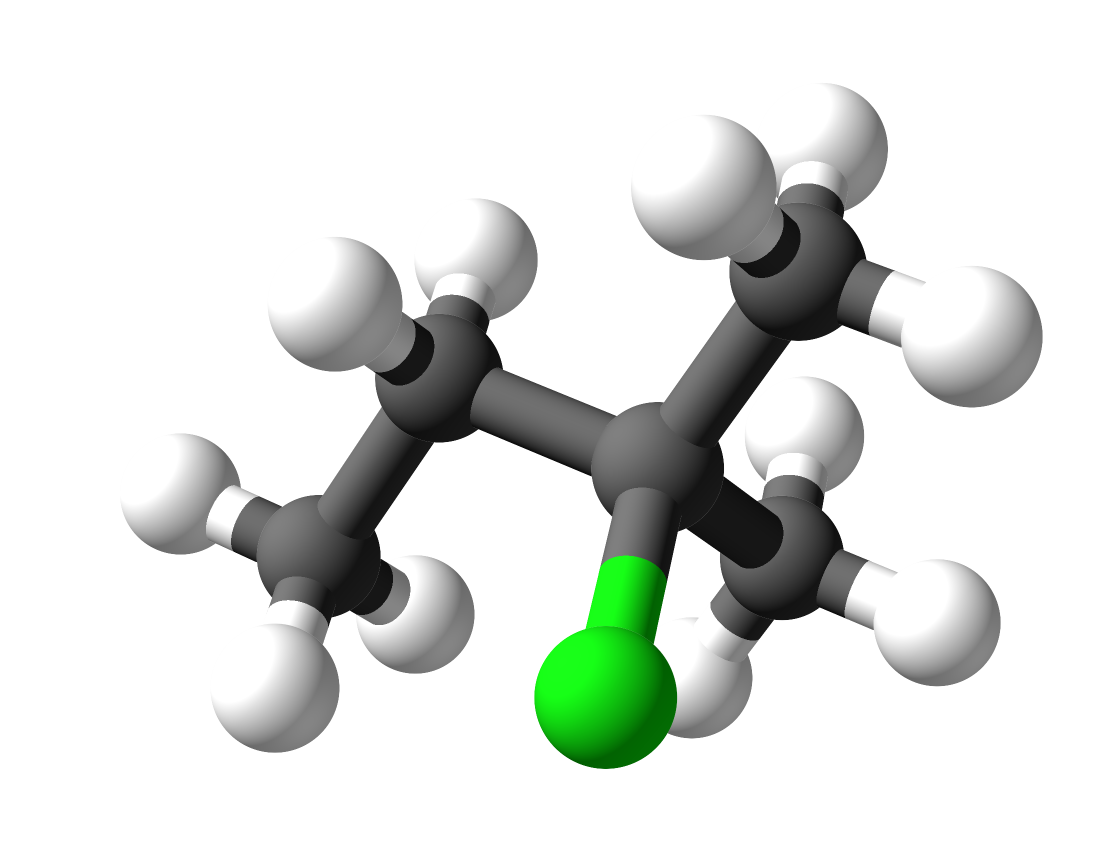

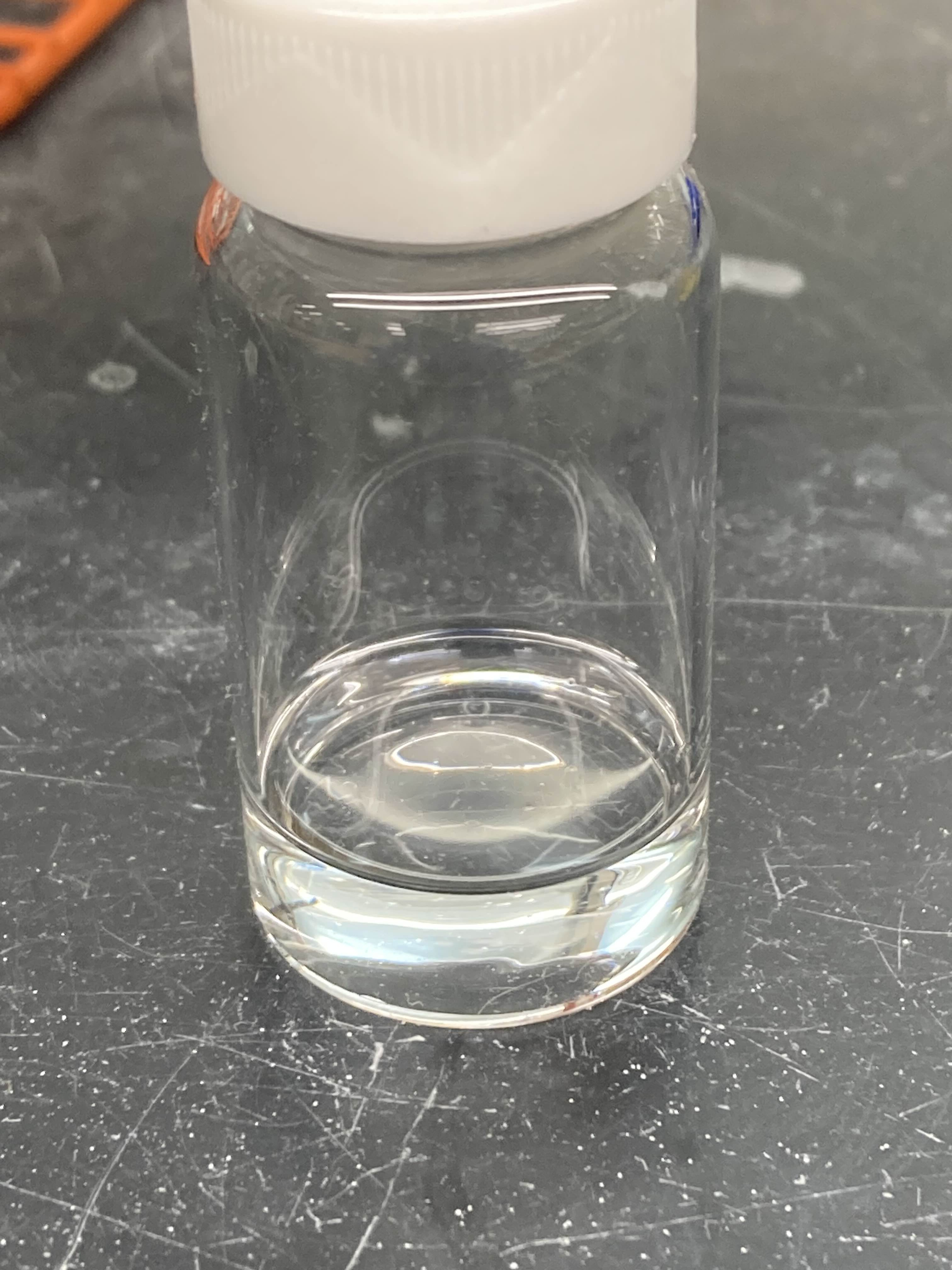

Names
- Preferred IUPAC name 2-Chloro-2-methylbutane
- Other names 1,1-Dimethylpropyl chloride; 2-Methyl-2-chlorobutane; tert-Pentyl chloride; t-Pentyl chloride; 2-methyl-2-butyl chloride

Identifiers
CAS Number	594-36-5
3D model (JSmol)	Interactive image
Abbreviations	TPC; TAC t-PeCl tPeCl^{t}PeCl t-AmCl tAmCl^{t}AmCl
ChemSpider	55090
ECHA InfoCard	100.008.944
PubChem CID	61143
UNII	QO6BZZ3FGR
CompTox Dashboard (EPA)	DTXSID0060484
- InChI: InChI=1S/C5H11Cl/c1-4-5(2,3)6/h4H2,1-3H3 Key: CRNIHJHMEQZAAS-UHFFFAOYSA-N; InChI=1/C5H11Cl/c1-4-5(2,3)6/h4H2,1-3H3 Key: CRNIHJHMEQZAAS-UHFFFAOYAL
- SMILES: CCC(C)(Cl)C

Properties
Chemical formula	C_{5}H_{11}Cl
Molar mass	106.59 g·mol^{−1}
Appearance	Colorless liquid
Odor	unpleasant
Density	0.866 g/mL
Melting point	−73 °C (−99 °F; 200 K)
Boiling point	85 to 86 °C (185 to 187 °F; 358 to 359 K)
- Except where otherwise noted, data are given for materials in their standard state (at 25 °C [77 °F], 100 kPa). verify (what is ?) Infobox references

tert-Amyl chloride (2-methyl-2-butyl chloride) is an alkyl chloride used for flavoring and odorizing. At room temperature, it is a colorless liquid with an unpleasant odor. It is an isomer of 1-chloropentane (n-amyl chloride).

== Synthesis ==
tert-Amyl chloride can be synthesized from tert-amyl alcohol via an S_{N}1 reaction with concentrated hydrochloric acid.

== See also ==
- 1-Chloropentane
