= 1,1-Diethoxyethane =

- Skeletal formula

Names
- Preferred IUPAC name 1,1-Diethoxyethane
- Other names: Acetaldehyde diethyl acetal; Acetal; Ethylidene diethyl ether

Identifiers
CAS Number	105-57-7
3D model (JSmol)	Interactive image
ChemSpider	13835836
ECHA InfoCard	100.003.010
EC Number	203-310-6
PubChem CID	7765
UNII	5G14F9E2HB
CompTox Dashboard (EPA)	DTXSID6030607
- InChI: InChI=1S/C6H14O2/c1-4-7-6(3)8-5-2/h6H,4-5H2,1-3H3 Key: DHKHKXVYLBGOIT-UHFFFAOYSA-N; InChI=1/C6H14O2/c1-4-7-6(3)8-5-2/h6H,4-5H2,1-3H3 Key: DHKHKXVYLBGOIT-UHFFFAOYAL
- SMILES: CCOC(C)OCC

Properties
Chemical formula	C_{6}H_{14}O_{2}
Molar mass	118.176 g·mol^{−1}
Appearance	Colorless liquid
Density	0.83 g/cm^{3}
Melting point	−113 °C (−171 °F; 160 K)
Boiling point	102 °C (216 °F; 375 K)
Solubility in water	46 g/L
Refractive index (n_{D})	1.3834 (20 °C)
- Except where otherwise noted, data are given for materials in their standard state (at 25 °C [77 °F], 100 kPa). Infobox references

1,1-Diethoxyethane (acetaldehyde diethyl acetal) is a major flavoring component of distilled beverages, especially malt whisky and sherry. Although it is just one of many compounds containing an acetal functional group, this specific chemical is sometimes called simply acetal.
