= Ethylene glycol diethyl ether =

Names
- IUPAC name 1,2-Diethoxyethane
- Other names: Ethyl glyme; Diethyl cellosolve; 2-Ethoxyethyl ethyl ether; 3,6-Dioxaoctane

Identifiers
CAS Number	629-14-1
3D model (JSmol)	Interactive image
ChEMBL	ChEMBL1877517
ChemSpider	13835376
ECHA InfoCard	100.010.070
EC Number	211-076-1
PubChem CID	12375
UNII	F99O7F0CYH
UN number	1153
CompTox Dashboard (EPA)	DTXSID5025285
- InChI: InChI=1S/C6H14O2/c1-3-7-5-6-8-4-2/h3-6H2,1-2H3 Key: LZDKZFUFMNSQCJ-UHFFFAOYSA-N
- SMILES: CCOCCOCC

Properties
Chemical formula	C_{6}H_{14}O_{2}
Molar mass	118.176 g·mol^{−1}
Appearance	Colorless liquid
Density	0.84 g/cm^{3} (20 °C)
Melting point	−74 °C (−101 °F; 199 K)
Boiling point	122 °C (252 °F; 395 K)
Solubility in water	Slightly soluble in water

Hazards
- GHS labelling
Pictograms	(GHS02: Flammable) (GHS07: Exclamation mark) (GHS08: Health hazard)
Signal word	Warning
Hazard statements	H225, H319, H360Df
Precautionary statements	P203, P210, P233, P240, P241, P242, P243, P264+P265, P280, P303+P361+P353, P305+P351+P338, P318, P337+P317, P370+P378, P403+P235, P405, P501
NFPA 704 (fire diamond)	2 3 0
Flash point	19–35 °C (66–95 °F; 292–308 K)
- Except where otherwise noted, data are given for materials in their standard state (at 25 °C [77 °F], 100 kPa). Infobox references

Ethylene glycol diethyl ether (also known as 1,2-diethoxyethane or ethyl glyme) is an organic compound with the formula C_{6}H_{14}O_{2}. It is a colorless liquid and a member of the glycol ether family.

== Properties ==
Ethylene glycol diethyl ether is a clear colorless liquid with a faint ether-like odor. It is less dense than water and slightly soluble in water.

== Hazards ==
Ethylene glycol diethyl ether is a flammable liquid with reported flash points ranging from 19 to 35 °C (66 to 95 °F). It is classified as a fire hazard, and containers may explode in fire. It can affect humans when breathed in or by passing through the skin.

== Uses ==
It is used as a solvent in chemical manufacturing and for detergents and cleaning products.
