= 2,5-Hexanediol =

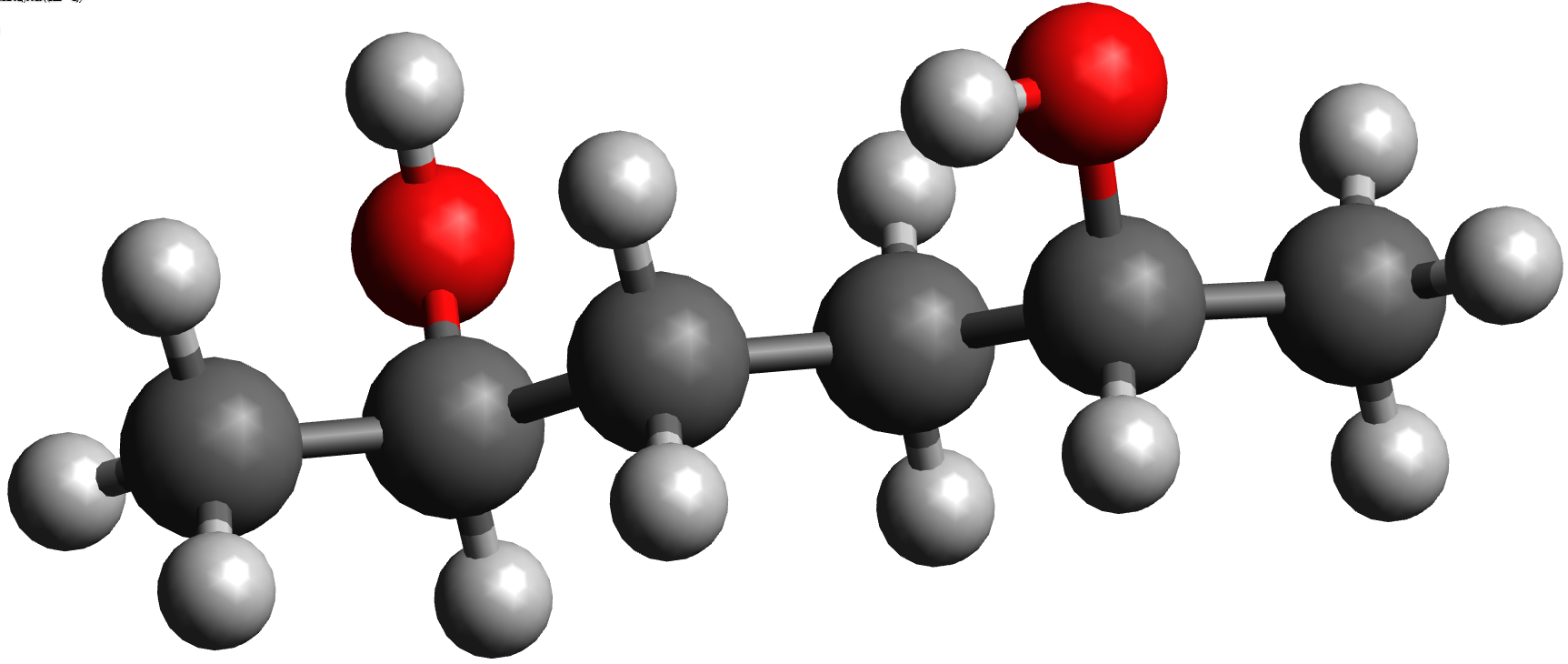

Names
- Preferred IUPAC name Hexane-2,5-diol

Identifiers
CAS Number	2935-44-6
3D model (JSmol)	Interactive image
ChEBI	CHEBI:84894
ChemSpider	17052
ECHA InfoCard	100.019.010
EC Number	220-910-3
PubChem CID	18049
CompTox Dashboard (EPA)	DTXSID50871000
- InChI: InChI=1S/C6H14O2/c1-5(7)3-4-6(2)8/h5-8H,3-4H2,1-2H3 Key: OHMBHFSEKCCCBW-UHFFFAOYSA-N
- SMILES: CC(CCC(C)O)O

Properties
Chemical formula	C_{6}H_{14}O_{2}
Molar mass	118.176 g·mol^{−1}

Hazards
- GHS labelling
Pictograms	(GHS07: Exclamation mark)
Signal word	Warning
Hazard statements	H302, H315, H319, H335
Precautionary statements	P261, P264, P264+P265, P270, P271, P280, P301+P317, P302+P352, P304+P340, P305+P351+P338, P319, P321, P330, P332+P317, P337+P317, P362+P364, P403+P233, P405, P501
- Except where otherwise noted, data are given for materials in their standard state (at 25 °C [77 °F], 100 kPa). Infobox references

2,5-Hexanediol is an organic compound with the formula CH_{3}CH(OH)CH_{2}CH_{2}CH(OH)CH_{3}. It is both a glycol and a secondary alcohol. It is a colorless water-soluble viscous liquid. The chemical properties are well understood and have been extensively reported and studied. It has the IUPAC name of hexane-2,5-diol and the CAS Registry Number CAS 2935-44-6.

== Other names ==
- (2R,5R)-2,5-hexanediol
- 2,5-Dihydroxyhexane
- Diisopropanol
- Hexan-2,5-diol
- [R-(R*,R*)]-2,5-hexanediol
- hexane-2,5-diol

== Manufacture ==
One common method of manufacture of the compound is from yeast. Another method involves the reduction of acetonylacetone. The material has two chiral carbons and thus has a number of enantiomers. Processes have been researched and developed to produce enantiopure products and by a continuous process. Some synthesis has been carried out from keto hexanoates.

== Uses ==
One of the uses of the material is to synthesize polyesters. and also fine chemicals.

== Toxicity ==
The toxicity of the material has been studied and is reasonably well understood. It can affect the eyes and has some neurotoxic effects.
