= Diglyme =

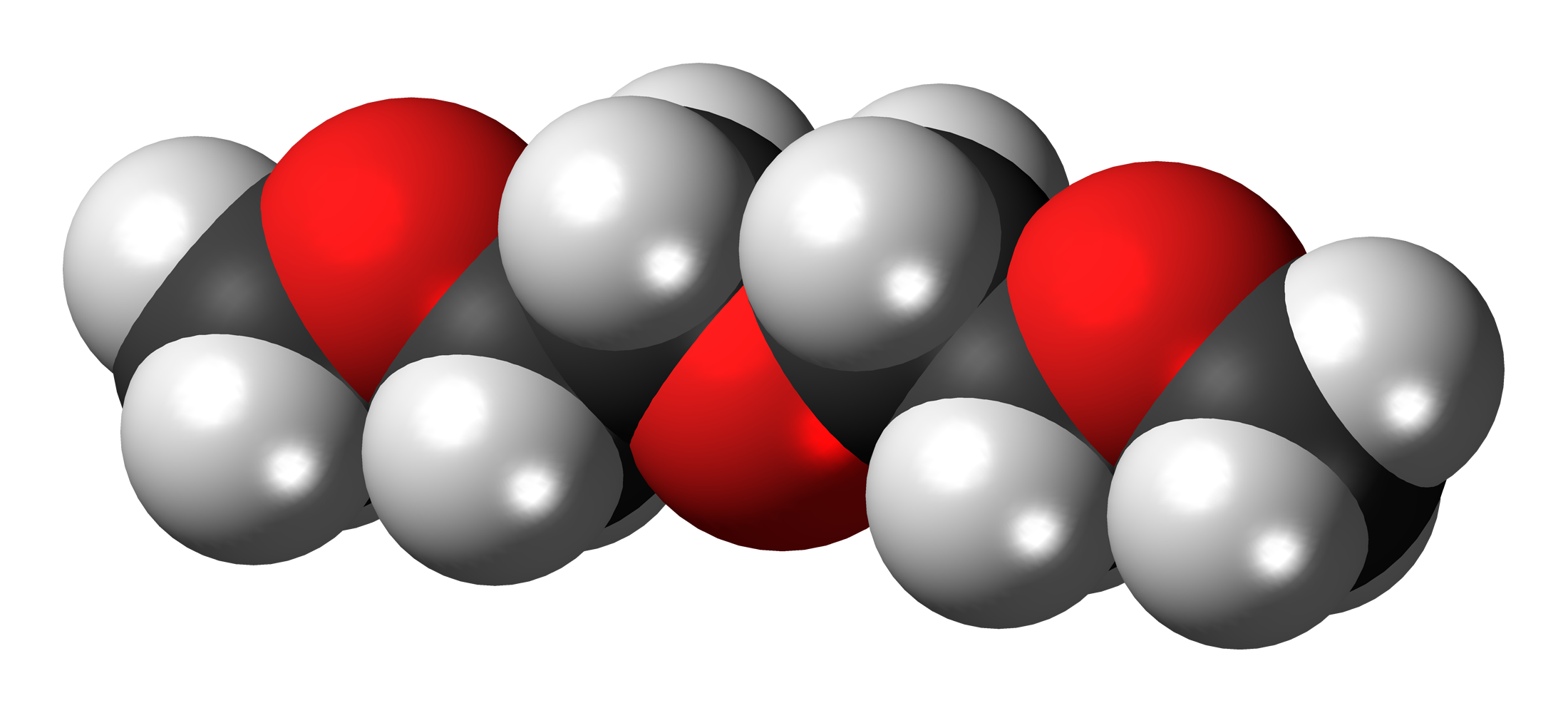

Names
- Preferred IUPAC name 1-Methoxy-2-(2-methoxyethoxy)ethane
- Other names Diglyme; 2-Methoxyethyl ether Di(2-methoxyethyl) ether Diethylene glycol dimethyl ether

Identifiers
CAS Number	111-96-6
3D model (JSmol)	Interactive image
Beilstein Reference	1736101
ChEBI	CHEBI:46784
ChEMBL	ChEMBL1234162
ChemSpider	13839575
DrugBank	DB02935
ECHA InfoCard	100.003.568
EC Number	203-924-4
Gmelin Reference	26843
PubChem CID	8150
RTECS number	KN3339000
UNII	M4BH3X0MVZ
UN number	2252 1993
CompTox Dashboard (EPA)	DTXSID1024621
- InChI: InChI=1S/C6H14O3/c1-7-3-5-9-6-4-8-2/h3-6H2,1-2H3 Key: SBZXBUIDTXKZTM-UHFFFAOYSA-N; InChI=1/C6H14O3/c1-7-3-5-9-6-4-8-2/h3-6H2,1-2H3 Key: SBZXBUIDTXKZTM-UHFFFAOYAG
- SMILES: COCCOCCOC

Properties
Chemical formula	(CH_{3}OCH_{2}CH_{2})_{2}O
Molar mass	134.175 g·mol^{−1}
Density	0.937 g/mL
Melting point	−64 °C (−83 °F; 209 K)
Boiling point	162 °C (324 °F; 435 K)
Solubility in water	Miscible

Hazards
- GHS labelling
Pictograms	(GHS02: Flammable) (GHS08: Health hazard)
Signal word	Danger
Hazard statements	H226, H360
Precautionary statements	P201, P202, P210, P233, P240, P241, P242, P243, P280, P281, P303+P361+P353, P308+P313, P370+P378, P403+P235, P405, P501
Flash point	57 °C (135 °F; 330 K)

Related compounds
Related compounds	Diethylene glycol diethyl ether, ethylene glycol dimethyl ether
- Except where otherwise noted, data are given for materials in their standard state (at 25 °C [77 °F], 100 kPa). verify (what is ?) Infobox references

Diglyme, or bis(2-methoxyethyl) ether, is an organic compound with the chemical formula (CH_{3}OCH_{2}CH_{2})_{2}O. It is a colorless liquid with a slight ether-like odor. It is a solvent with a high boiling point. It is the dimethyl ether of diethylene glycol. The name diglyme is a portmanteau of diglycol methyl ether. It is miscible with water as well as organic solvents.

It is prepared by a reaction of dimethyl ether and ethylene oxide over an acid catalyst.

== Solvent ==
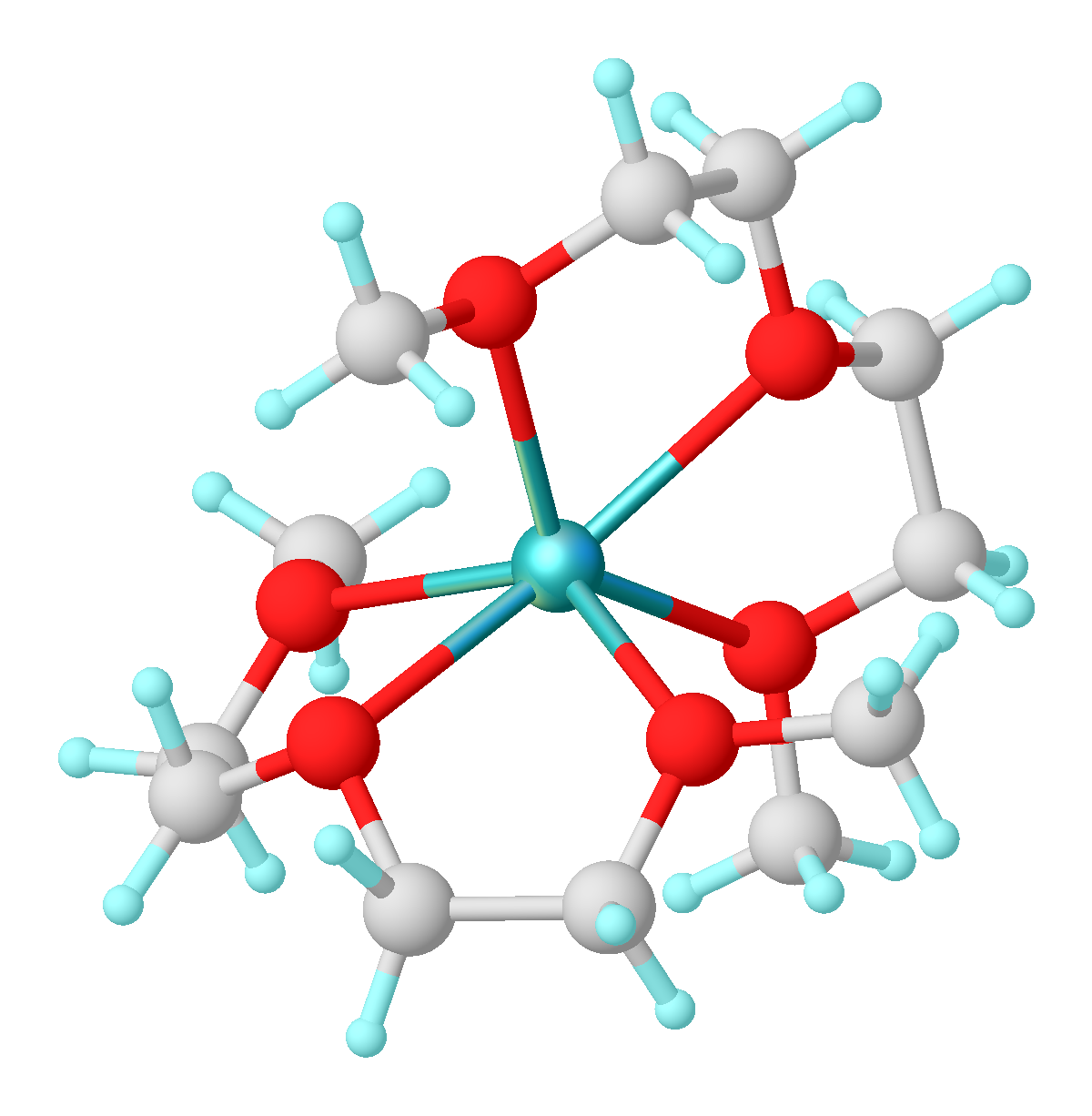
Structure of [Na(diglyme)_{2}]^{+} as found in its salt with the fluorenyl anion.

Because of its resistance to strong bases, diglyme is favored as a solvent for reactions of alkali metal reagents even at high temperatures. Rate enhancements in reactions involving organometallic reagents, such as Grignard reactions or metal hydride reductions, have been observed when using diglyme as a solvent.

Diglyme is also used as a solvent in hydroboration reactions with diborane.

It serves as a chelate for alkali metal cations, leaving anions more active.

== Safety ==
The European Chemicals Agency lists diglyme as a substance of very high concern (SVHC) as a reproductive toxin.

At higher temperatures and in the presence of active metals diglyme is known to decompose, which can produce large amounts of gas and heat. This decomposition led to the T2 Laboratories reactor explosion in 2007.
