= 2-Methoxyethanol =

- 2-Methoxyethanol

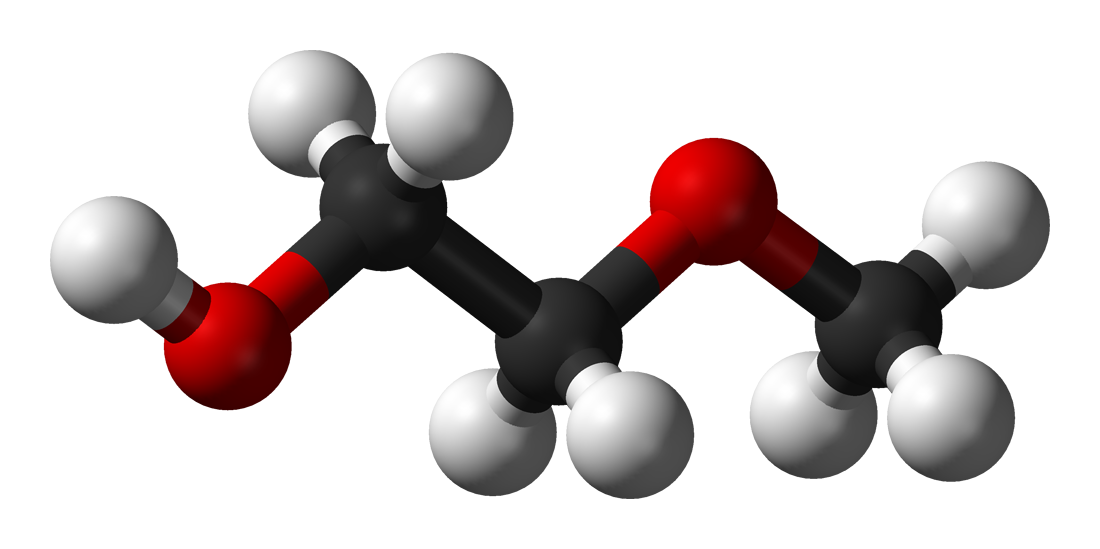
- 2-Methoxyethanol

Names
- Preferred IUPAC name 2-Methoxyethan-1-ol
- Other names Ethylene glycol monomethyl ether EGME; Methyl Cellosolve; 2-MOE

Identifiers
CAS Number	109-86-4
3D model (JSmol)	Interactive image
Beilstein Reference	1731074
ChEBI	CHEBI:46790
ChEMBL	ChEMBL444144
ChemSpider	7728
DrugBank	DB02806
ECHA InfoCard	100.003.377
EC Number	203-713-7
Gmelin Reference	81877
KEGG	D05554
PubChem CID	8019
RTECS number	KL5775000
UNII	EK1L6XWI56
UN number	1188
CompTox Dashboard (EPA)	DTXSID101349127, DTXSID10872619 DTXSID5024182, DTXSID101349127, DTXSID10872619
- InChI: InChI=1S/C3H8O2/c1-5-3-2-4/h4H,2-3H2,1H3 Key: XNWFRZJHXBZDAG-UHFFFAOYSA-N; InChI=1/C3H8O2/c1-5-3-2-4/h4H,2-3H2,1H3 Key: XNWFRZJHXBZDAG-UHFFFAOYAC
- SMILES: OCCOC

Properties
Chemical formula	C_{3}H_{8}O_{2}
Molar mass	76.09 g/mol
Appearance	Colorless liquid
Odor	Ether-like
Density	0.965 g/cm^{3}
Melting point	−85 °C (−121 °F; 188 K)
Boiling point	124 to 125 °C (255 to 257 °F; 397 to 398 K)
Solubility in water	miscible
Vapor pressure	6 mmHg (20°C)

Hazards
- GHS labelling
Pictograms	(GHS02: Flammable) (GHS07: Exclamation mark) (GHS08: Health hazard)
Signal word	Danger
Hazard statements	H226, H302, H312, H332, H360
Precautionary statements	P201, P202, P210, P233, P240, P241, P242, P243, P261, P264, P270, P271, P280, P281, P301+P312, P302+P352, P303+P361+P353, P304+P312, P304+P340, P308+P313, P312, P322, P330, P363, P370+P378, P403+P235, P405, P501
NFPA 704 (fire diamond)	3 2 2
Flash point	39 °C (102 °F; 312 K)
Explosive limits	1.8–14%
- Lethal dose or concentration (LD, LC)
LD_{Lo} (lowest published)	2370 mg/kg (rat, oral); 890 mg/kg (rabbit, oral); 1480 mg/kg (mouse, oral); 950 mg/kg (guinea pig, oral)
LC_{50} (median concentration)	1480 ppm (mouse, 7 hr)
- NIOSH (US health exposure limits)
PEL (Permissible)	TWA 25 ppm (80 mg/m^{3}) [skin]
REL (Recommended)	TWA 0.1 ppm (0.3 mg/m^{3}) [skin]
IDLH (Immediate danger)	200 ppm
Safety data sheet (SDS)	External MSDS
- Except where otherwise noted, data are given for materials in their standard state (at 25 °C [77 °F], 100 kPa). verify (what is ?) Infobox references

2-Methoxyethanol, or methyl cellosolve, is an organic compound with formula C_{3}H_{8}O_{2} that is used mainly as a solvent. It is a clear, colorless liquid with an ether-like odor. It is in a class of solvents known as glycol ethers which are notable for their ability to dissolve a variety of different types of chemical compounds and for their miscibility with water and other solvents. It can be formed by the nucleophilic attack of methanol on protonated ethylene oxide followed by proton transfer:

C_{2}H_{5}O^{+} + CH_{3}OH → C_{3}H_{8}O_{2} + H^{+}

2-Methoxyethanol is used as a solvent for many different purposes such as varnishes, dyes, and resins. It is also used as an additive in airplane deicing solutions. In organometallic chemistry it is commonly used for the synthesis of Vaska's complex and related compounds such as carbonylchlorohydridotris(triphenylphosphine)ruthenium (II). During these reactions the alcohol acts as a source of hydride and carbon monoxide.

2-Methoxyethanol is toxic to the bone marrow and testicles. Workers exposed to high levels are at risk for granulocytopenia, macrocytic anemia, oligospermia, and azoospermia.

The methoxyethanol is converted by alcohol dehydrogenase into methoxyacetic acid which is the substance which causes the harmful effects. Both ethanol and acetate have a protecting effect. The methoxyacetate can enter the Krebs cycle where it forms methoxycitrate.

== Presence in interstellar space ==
In 2024, a group led by researchers at the Massachusetts Institute of Technology reported the discovery of 2-methoxyethanol in a star-forming region within the nebula NGC 6334. The discovery was made by examining in the laboratory the spectral signature of 2-methoxyethanol as the molecule was made to rotate. This signature was then sought in observational data for the region collected by the Atacama Large Millimeter Array, and 25 of its spectral lines were detected, constituting a secure identification of the molecule in the astronomical data.
