= Tetraethylene glycol dimethyl ether =

Names
- Preferred IUPAC name 2,5,8,11,14-Pentaoxapentadecane
- Other names Bis[2-(2-methoxyethoxy)ethyl] ether, Tetraglyme, Dimethoxytetraglycol

Identifiers
CAS Number	143-24-8
3D model (JSmol)	Interactive image
Abbreviations	TEGDME, tetraglyme, E181
ChEBI	CHEBI:46785
ChemSpider	13835433
ECHA InfoCard	100.005.086
EC Number	205-594-7
PubChem CID	8925
UNII	78L136FLZ9
CompTox Dashboard (EPA)	DTXSID7044396
- InChI: InChI=1S/C10H22O5/c1-11-3-5-13-7-9-15-10-8-14-6-4-12-2/h3-10H2,1-2H3 Key: ZUHZGEOKBKGPSW-UHFFFAOYSA-N
- SMILES: COCCOCCOCCOCCOC

Properties
Chemical formula	C_{10}H_{22}O_{5}
Molar mass	222.281 g·mol^{−1}
Appearance	Colorless liquid
Density	1.009 g/mL
Melting point	−30 °C (−22 °F; 243 K)
Boiling point	275.3 °C (527.5 °F; 548.5 K)
Solubility in water	Miscible
Acidity (pK_{a})	38

Thermochemistry
Std enthalpy of formation (Δ_{f}H^{⦵}_{298})	1134.6 kJ/mol
Std enthalpy of combustion (Δ_{c}H^{⦵}_{298})	6196.5 kJ/mol

Hazards
- Occupational safety and health (OHS/OSH)
Main hazards	Reproductive toxicity
- GHS labelling
Pictograms	(GHS08: Health hazard)
Signal word	Danger
Hazard statements	H360
Precautionary statements	P201, P202, P281, P308+P313, P405, P501
NFPA 704 (fire diamond)	1 1 0
Flash point	141 °C (286 °F; 414 K)
Autoignition temperature	200 °C (392 °F; 473 K)
- Lethal dose or concentration (LD, LC)
LD_{50} (median dose)	5,140 mg/kg (rat, oral)
Safety data sheet (SDS)	Fisher Scientific 34316

Related compounds
Related	glycol ethers
- Except where otherwise noted, data are given for materials in their standard state (at 25 °C [77 °F], 100 kPa). Infobox references

Tetraethylene glycol dimethyl ether (TEGDME or tetraglyme) is a polar aprotic solvent with excellent chemical and thermal stability. Its high boiling point and stability makes it an ideal candidate for separation processes and high temperature reactions. TEGDME is also used in lithium-ion battery technology and combined with trifluoroethanol as a working pair for organic absorption heat pumps.

TEGDME is listed as a Substance of Very High Concern under REACH regulations.
