= 2-Ethoxyethanol =

- 2-Ethoxyethanol

Names
- Preferred IUPAC name 2-Ethoxyethan-1-ol
- Other names Cellosolve ethylene glycol ethyl ether oxitol Ethyl Cellosolve; EGEE

Identifiers
CAS Number	110-80-5
3D model (JSmol)	Interactive image
Beilstein Reference	1098271
ChEBI	CHEBI:46788
ChEMBL	ChEMBL119596
ChemSpider	13836591
DrugBank	DB02249
ECHA InfoCard	100.003.459
EC Number	203-804-1
Gmelin Reference	82142
KEGG	C14687
PubChem CID	8076
RTECS number	KK8050000
UNII	IDK7C2HS09
UN number	1171
CompTox Dashboard (EPA)	DTXSID7024087
- InChI: InChI=1S/C4H10O2/c1-2-6-4-3-5/h5H,2-4H2,1H3 Key: ZNQVEEAIQZEUHB-UHFFFAOYSA-N; InChI=1/C4H10O2/c1-2-6-4-3-5/h5H,2-4H2,1H3 Key: ZNQVEEAIQZEUHB-UHFFFAOYAD
- SMILES: CCOCCO

Properties
Chemical formula	C_{4}H_{10}O_{2}
Molar mass	90.122 g·mol^{−1}
Appearance	clear liquid
Odor	sweet, ether-like
Density	0.930 g/cm^{3}, liquid
Melting point	−70 °C (−94 °F; 203 K)
Boiling point	135 °C (275 °F; 408 K)
Solubility in water	miscible
Vapor pressure	4 mmHg (20°C)

Hazards
- GHS labelling
Pictograms	(GHS02: Flammable) (GHS06: Toxic) (GHS07: Exclamation mark) (GHS08: Health hazard)
Signal word	Danger
Hazard statements	H226, H302, H331, H360
Precautionary statements	P201, P202, P210, P233, P240, P241, P242, P243, P261, P264, P270, P271, P280, P281, P301+P312, P303+P361+P353, P304+P340, P308+P313, P311, P321, P330, P370+P378, P403+P233, P403+P235, P405, P501
NFPA 704 (fire diamond)	2 2
Flash point	44 °C (111 °F; 317 K)
Explosive limits	1.7–15.6%
- Lethal dose or concentration (LD, LC)
LD_{50} (median dose)	2451 mg/kg (mouse, oral); 2125 mg/kg (rat, oral)
LC_{50} (median concentration)	2000 ppm (rat, 7 hr); 1820 ppm (mouse, 7 hr)
LC_{Lo} (lowest published)	3000 ppm (guinea pig, 24 hr)
- NIOSH (US health exposure limits)
PEL (Permissible)	TWA 200 ppm (740 mg/m^{3}) [skin]
REL (Recommended)	TWA 0.5 ppm (1.8 mg/m^{3}) [skin]
IDLH (Immediate danger)	500 ppm

Related compounds
Related ethers	2-Propoxyethanol; 2-Butoxyethanol
Related compounds	Ethylene glycol
- Except where otherwise noted, data are given for materials in their standard state (at 25 °C [77 °F], 100 kPa). verify (what is ?) Infobox references

2-Ethoxyethanol, also known by the trademark Ethyl cellosolve, is a solvent used widely in commercial and industrial applications. It is a clear, colorless, nearly odorless liquid that is miscible with water, ethanol, diethyl ether, acetone, and ethyl acetate.

2-Ethoxyethanol is manufactured by the reaction of ethylene oxide with ethanol.

As with other glycol ethers, 2-ethoxyethanol has the useful property of being able to dissolve chemically diverse compounds. It will dissolve oils, resins, grease, waxes, nitrocellulose, and lacquers. This is an ideal property as a multi-purpose cleaner, and, therefore, 2-ethoxyethanol is used in products such as varnish removers and degreasing solutions.
