= Wilhelm Rudolph Fittig =

German chemist (1835–1910)

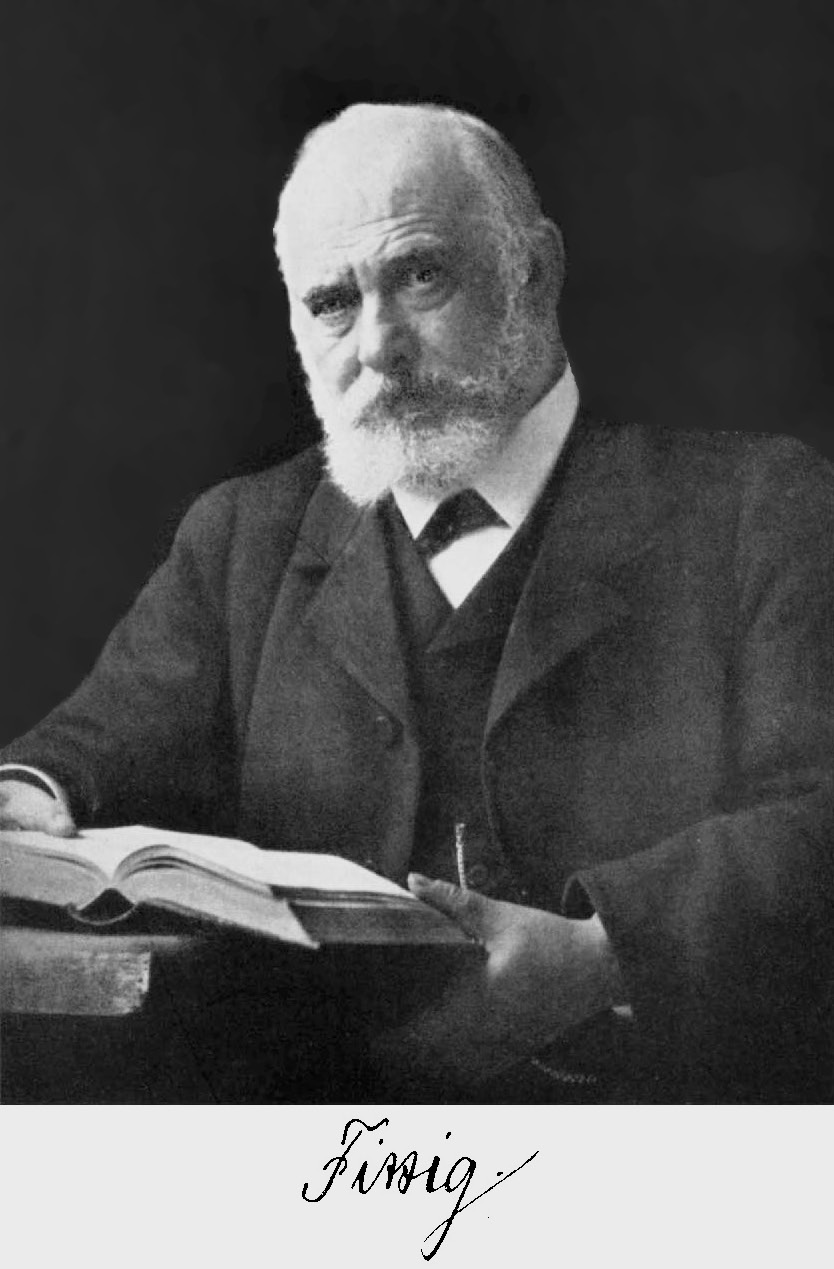
- Born: 6 December 1835; Free and Hanseatic City of Hamburg, German Confederation
- Died: 19 November 1910 (aged 74); Strasbourg, Alsace–Lorraine, German Empire (now Grand Est, France)
- Education: University of Göttingen
- Known for: Fittig reaction Lactone; Pinacol rearrangement
- Awards: Davy Medal (1906)
- Scientific career
- Fields: Chemistry
- Workplaces: University of Göttingen
- Doctoral advisor: Heinrich Limpricht and Friedrich Wöhler
- Doctoral students: Ira Remsen

Wilhelm Rudolph Fittig (6 December 1835 – 19 November 1910) was a German chemist. He discovered the pinacol coupling reaction, mesitylene, diacetyl and biphenyl. Fittig studied the action of sodium on ketones and hydrocarbons. He discovered the Fittig reaction or Wurtz–Fittig reaction for the synthesis of alkylbenzenes, he proposed a diketone structure for benzoquinone and isolated phenanthrene from coal tar. He discovered and synthesized the first lactones and investigated structures of piperine, naphthalene, and fluorene.

== Career ==
Fittig studied chemistry at the University of Göttingen, graduating as Ph.D. with a dissertation on acetone in 1858, under the supervision of Heinrich Limpricht and Friedrich Wöhler. He subsequently held several appointments at Göttingen, becoming Wöhler's assistant in 1858, privatdozent in 1860 and extraordinary professor in 1870. In 1870 he was appointed full professor at University of Tübingen and in 1876 at Strassburg, where the laboratories were erected from his designs.

Fittig's research covered wide areas of organic chemistry. The aldehydes and ketones provided material for his earlier work. He observed that aldehydes and ketones may suffer reduction in neutral, alkaline, and sometimes acid solution to secondary and tertiary glycols, substances which he named pinacones; and also that certain pinacones when distilled with dilute sulfuric acid gave compounds, which he named pinacolines. The unsaturated acids also received much attention, and he discovered the internal anhydrides of oxyacids, termed lactones. He also discovered what is now known as the pinacol rearrangement, whereby 1,2-diols rearrange to aldehydes or ketones under acid catalysis. His work involved the preparation of 2,3-dimethyl-2,3-butanediol (pinacol) from acetone, followed by the rearrangement to 3,3-dimethylbutanone (pinacolone), which was then oxidised with dichromate to trimethylacetic acid. Fittig's interpretation of his results was incorrect and the products formed were not identified until more than a decade later when Aleksandr Butlerov independently prepared trimethylacetic acid and confirmed it was the same product as Fittig had prepared.

In 1855, Charles-Adolphe Wurtz showed that when sodium acted upon alkyl iodides, the alkyl residues combined to form more complex hydrocarbons; Fittig developed this Wurtz reaction method by showing that a mixture of an aryl halide and an alkyl halide, under similar treatment, yielded homologues of benzene. This process is now known as the Wurtz-Fittig reaction.

His investigations on Perkin's reaction led him to an explanation of its mechanism which appeared to be more in accordance with the facts. The question, however, was one of much difficulty, and at the time the exact course of the reaction appears to await solution. These researches incidentally solved the constitution of coumarin, the odoriferous principle of woodruff. Fittig and Erdmann's observation that γ-phenyl structural analog of isocrotonic acid readily yielded α-naphthol by loss of water was of much importance, since it afforded valuable evidence as to the constitution of naphthalene. They also investigated certain hydrocarbons occurring in the high boiling point fraction of the coal tar distillate and solved the constitution of phenanthrene. Much initial knowledge of the alkaloid piperine was owed to Fittig, who in collaboration with Ira Remsen established its constitution in 1871.

Fittig published two widely used textbooks; he edited several editions of Wohler's Grundriss der organischen Chemie (11th ed., 1887) and wrote an Unorganische Chemie (1st ed., 1872; 3rd, 1882). His researches were recognized by many scientific societies and institutions, the Royal Society awarding him the Davy medal in 1906.

== See also ==
- 2,5-Furandicarboxylic acid
- Durene
- Pinacol coupling reaction
