= Pinacol coupling reaction =

Organic chemical reaction

| Named after | Pinacol |
| Reaction type | Coupling reaction |

Identifiers
| Organic Chemistry Portal | pinacol-coupling-reaction |

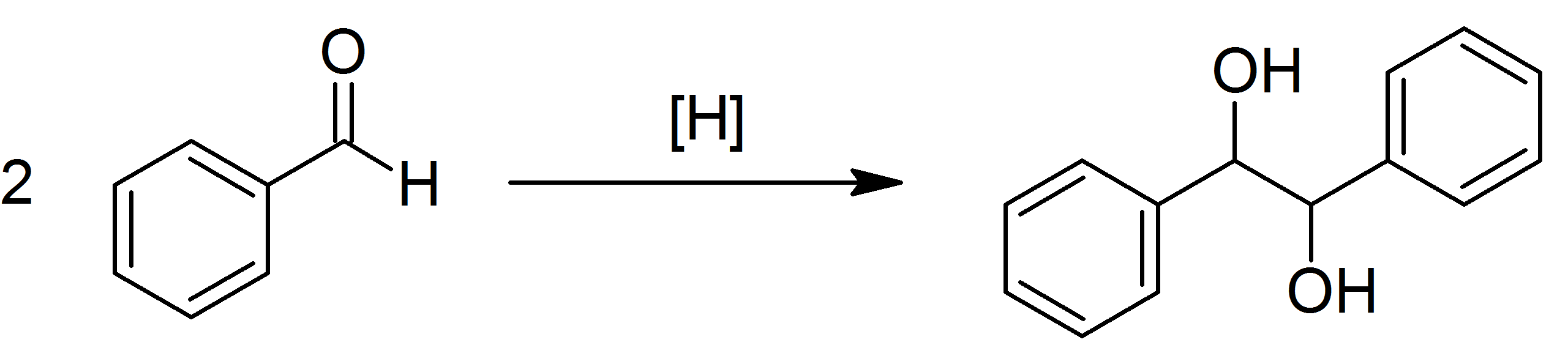
The Pinacol coupling reaction

A pinacol coupling reaction is an organic reaction in which a carbon–carbon bond is formed between the carbonyl groups of an aldehyde or a ketone in presence of an electron donor in a free radical process. The reaction product is a vicinal diol. The reaction is named after pinacol (also known as 2,3-dimethyl-2,3-butanediol or tetramethylethylene glycol), which is the product of this reaction when done with acetone as reagent. The reaction is usually a homocoupling but intramolecular cross-coupling reactions are also possible. Pinacol was discovered by Wilhelm Rudolph Fittig in 1859.

== Reaction mechanism ==
The first step in the reaction mechanism is a one-electron reduction of the carbonyl group by a reducing agent —such as magnesium— to a ketyl radical anion species. Two ketyl groups react in a coupling reaction yielding a vicinal diol with both hydroxyl groups deprotonated. Addition of water or another proton donor gives the diol. With magnesium as an electron donor, the initial reaction product is a 5-membered cyclic compound with the two oxygen atoms coordinated to the oxidized Mg^{2+} ion. This complex is broken up by addition of water with formation of magnesium hydroxide. The pinacol coupling can be followed up by a pinacol rearrangement. A related reaction is the McMurry reaction, which uses titanium(III) chloride or titanium(IV) chloride in conjunction with a reducing agent for the formation of the metal-diol complex, and which takes place with an additional deoxygenation reaction step in order to provide an alkene product.

== Scope ==
The pinacol reaction has been studied intensely and tolerates many different reductants, including electrochemical syntheses. Variants are known for homo- and cross-coupling, intra- and inter-molecular reactions with appropriate diastereo- or enantioselectivity; as of 2006, the only unsettled frontier was enantioselective cross-coupling of aliphatic aldehydes. In general, aryl carbonyls give higher yields than aliphatic carbonyls, and diaryls may spontaneously react with a hydride donor in the presence of light.

Although an active metal reduction, modern pinacol reactions tolerate protic substrates and solvents; it is sometimes performed in water. Ester groups do not react, but some nitriles do. Fewer aza variants have been studied, but the analogous reaction with imines yields diamines.

Traditionally, the pinacol reductant is an alkali or alkaline earth metal, but these result in low yields and selectivity. Catalytic salts of most early transition metals and a nonmetal reductant (e.g. iodides) give dramatically improved performance, and appropriate chiral ligands can give high enantiomeric excesses. Conversely, stoichiometric transition metal salts typically deoxygenate to the alkene (the McMurry reaction).

Alternatively, the reaction may be performed under electride solution conditions: certain tartaric acid derivatives can be obtained with high diastereoselectivity in a system of samarium(II) iodide and HMPA.

Light catalyzes the pinacol homocoupling of benzophenone. When photosensitizers are used, their nature and shrewd choice of suited co-catalysts can deeply affect the stereochemistry of the reaction. For instance, a red-absorbing organic dye was successfully used with catalytic amounts of titanocene dichloride, and stoichiometric amounts of Hantzsch ester as the sacrificial reductant, to allow the diastereoselective pinacol coupling of aryl aldehydes.

The reaction's applications include closure of large rings. Two famous examples of pinacol coupling used in total synthesis are the Mukaiyama Taxol total synthesis and the Nicolaou Taxol total synthesis.

The Pinacol coupling between methylglyoxal occurs to give 3,4-dihydroxyhexane-2,5-dione [25566-16-9]. Under the right conditions, this can be made to undergo cyclization in Furaneol.
