= Wurtz–Fittig reaction =

Chemical reaction

Named after	Charles Adolphe Wurtz; Wilhelm Rudolph Fittig
Reaction type	Coupling reaction

Identifiers
Organic Chemistry Portal	wurtz-fittig-reaction

The Wurtz–Fittig reaction is the chemical reaction of an aryl halide, alkyl halides, and sodium metal to give substituted aromatic compounds. Following the work of Charles Adolphe Wurtz on the sodium-induced coupling of alkyl halides (the Wurtz reaction), Wilhelm Rudolph Fittig extended the approach to the coupling of an alkyl halide with an aryl halide. This modification of the Wurtz reaction is considered a separate process and is named for both scientists.

This reaction allows alkylation of aryl halides. The reaction works best for forming asymmetrical products if the halide reactants are somehow separate in their relative chemical reactivities. One way to accomplish this is to form the reactants with halogens of different periods. Typically the alkyl halide is made more reactive than the aryl halide, increasing the probability that the alkyl halide will form the organosodium bond first and thus act more effectively as a nucleophile toward the aryl halide. Typically the reaction is used for the alkylation of aryl halides. With the use of ultrasound sodium reacts with some aryl halides to produce biphenyl compounds.

== Mechanism ==
The mechanism of the Wurtz–Fittig reaction has not been the subject of modern investigations. The process was once proposed to involve the combination of an alkyl and aryl radicals. Another mechanistic proposal invoked the generation of organosodium intermediates. The reaction of sodium and chlorobenzene produces triphenylene, which supports a role for radicals. A role for organosodium compounds is supported by indirect evidence. For example, addition of carbon dioxide to a mixture of sodium and isobutyl bromide results in the formation of 3-methylbutanoic acid after acid workup.

== Use of other metals ==
The Wurtz–Fittig reaction can be conducted using metals other than sodium. Some examples include potassium, iron, copper, and lithium. When lithium is used, the reaction occurs with appreciable yield only under ultrasound. Ultrasound is known to cleave halogen atoms from aryl and alkyl halides through a free-radical mechanism

== Applications ==
The Wurtz–Fittig reaction has limited applicability because it is plagued by side reactions including rearrangements and eliminations. The reaction has been applied to the laboratory synthesis of some organosilicon compounds. One example is the conversion of tetraethyl orthosilicate to the mono-tert-butoxy derivative in 40% yield as summarized in this idealized equation:

Si(OC_{2}H_{5})_{4} + 2 Na + (CH_{3})_{3}CCl → Si(OC_{2}H_{5})_{3}OC(CH_{3})_{3} + NaCl + C_{2}H_{5}ONa

·Molten sodium was used.

Other organosilicon compounds synthesized using the Wurtz–Fittig reaction include silylated calixarenes and vinylsilanes.

== See also ==
- Wurtz reaction
