= Pinacol =

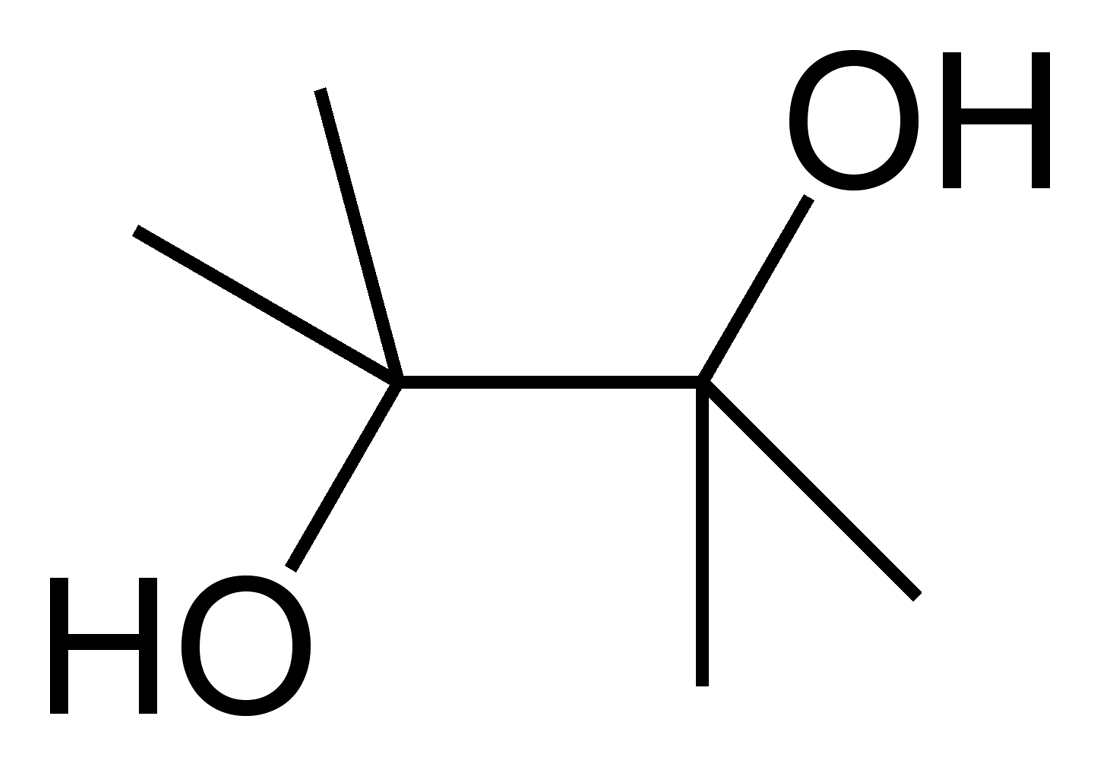
- Pinacol

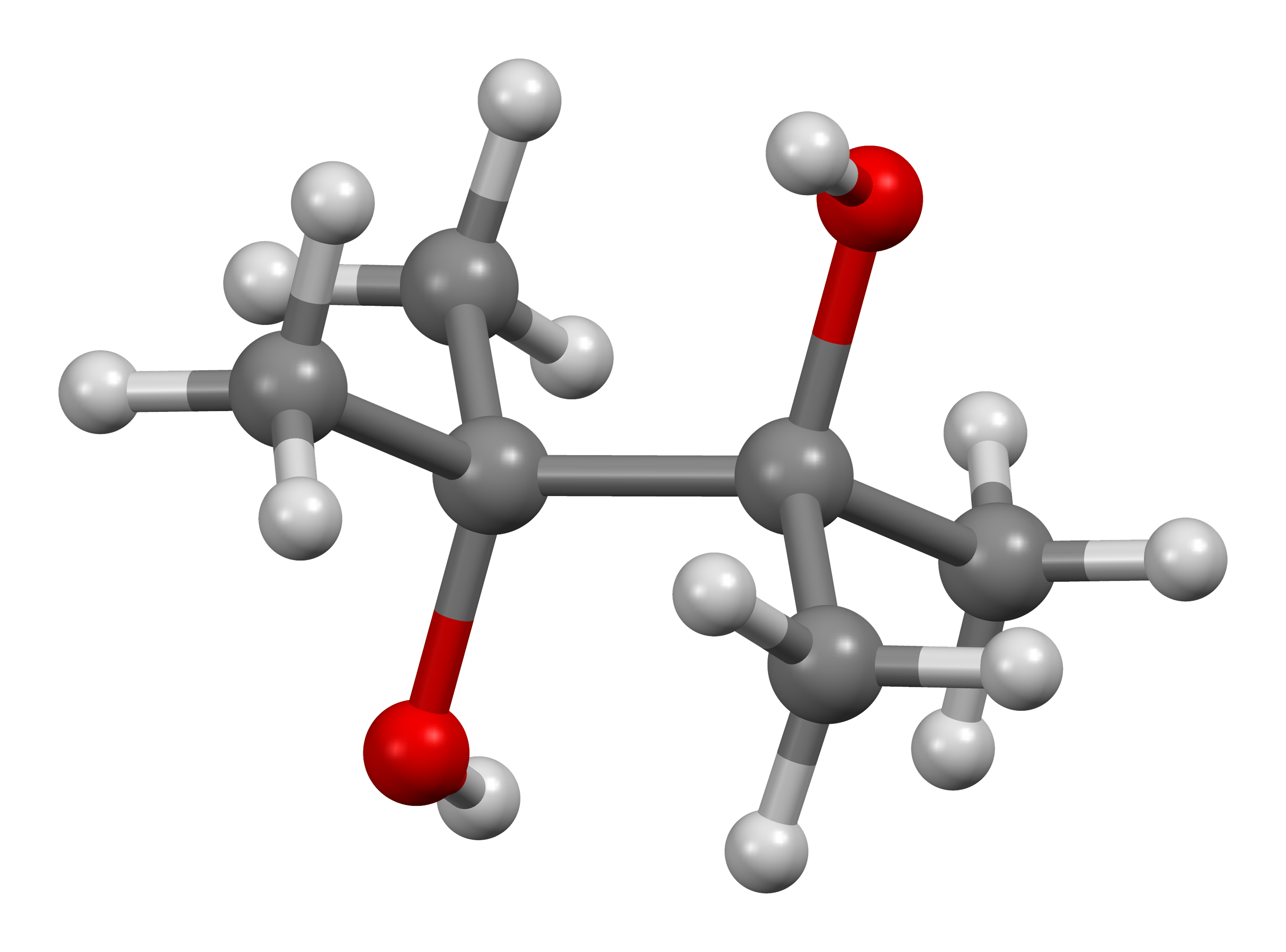
- Ball-and-stick model of pinacol

Names
- Preferred IUPAC name 2,3-Dimethylbutane-2,3-diol
- Other names 2,3-Dimethyl-2,3-butanediol; Tetramethylethylene glycol 1,1,2,2-Tetramethylethylene glycol Pinacone

Identifiers
| CAS Number | 76-09-5 |
| 3D model (JSmol) | Interactive image; Interactive image |
| ChEBI | CHEBI:131185 |
| ChEMBL | ChEMBL3289669 |
| ChemSpider | 21109330 |
| ECHA InfoCard | 100.000.849 |
| EC Number | 200-933-5 |
| PubChem CID | 6425 |
| UNII | 527QE7I5CO |
| CompTox Dashboard (EPA) | DTXSID3058793 |
- InChI: InChI=1S/C6H14O2/c1-5(2,7)6(3,4)8/h7-8H,1-4H3 Key: IVDFJHOHABJVEH-UHFFFAOYSA-N
- SMILES: CC(C)(O)C(C)(C)O; CC(C)(O)C(C)(C)O

Properties
| Chemical formula | C_{6}H_{14}O_{2} |
| Molar mass | 118.174 g/mol |
| Appearance | White solid |
| Density | 0.967 g/cm^{3} |
| Melting point | 40 to 43 °C (104 to 109 °F; 313 to 316 K) |
| Boiling point | 171 to 173 °C (340 to 343 °F; 444 to 446 K) |

Hazards
- GHS labelling
| Pictograms | (GHS05: Corrosive) (GHS07: Exclamation mark) |
| Signal word | Warning |
| Hazard statements | H228, H315, H319, H335 |
| Precautionary statements | P210, P240, P241, P261, P264, P271, P280, P302+P352, P304+P340, P305+P351+P338, P312, P321, P332+P313, P337+P313, P362, P370+P378, P403+P233, P405, P501 |
| Flash point | 77 °C (171 °F; 350 K) |
| Safety data sheet (SDS) | External MSDS |

Related compounds
| Related compounds | Pinacolone |
- Except where otherwise noted, data are given for materials in their standard state (at 25 °C [77 °F], 100 kPa). verify (what is ?) Infobox references

Pinacol is a branched alcohol which finds use in organic syntheses. It is a diol that has hydroxyl groups on vicinal carbon atoms. A white solid that melts just above room temperature, pinacol is notable for undergoing the pinacol rearrangement in the presence of acid and for being the namesake of the pinacol coupling reaction.

== Preparation ==
It may be produced by the pinacol coupling reaction from acetone:

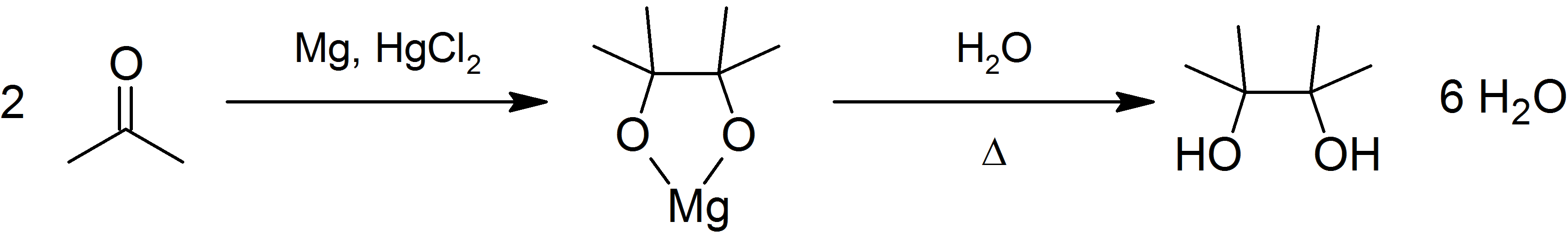

== Reactions ==
As a vicinal diol, it can rearrange to pinacolone by the pinacol rearrangement, e.g., by heating with sulfuric acid:

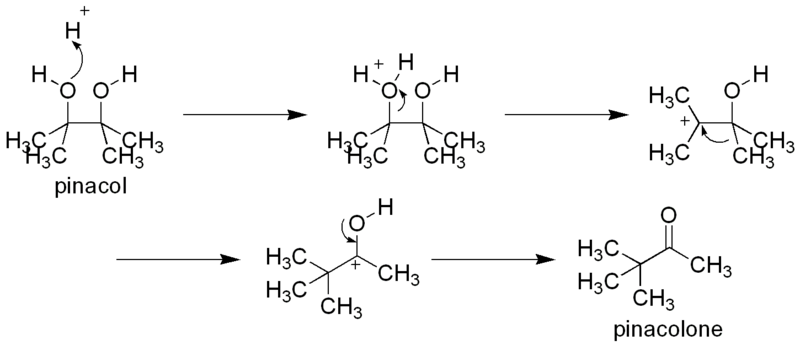

Pinacol can be used with borane and boron trichloride to produce useful synthetic intermediates such as pinacolborane, bis(pinacolato)diboron, and pinacolchloroborane.

== See also ==
- Pinacol coupling reaction
- Pinacol rearrangement
- Semipinacol rearrangement
