= Wöhler process =

Obsolete method of aluminum production

The Wöhler process was one of the first routes for producing aluminium metal. It involves the reduction of anhydrous aluminium chloride with potassium, produced powdered aluminium:

AlCl_{3} + 3 K → Al + 3 KCl

With advent of more efficient means of electrolysis, e.g., Hall–Héroult process, the Wöhler process and related chemical-based routes became obsolete.

== History ==
In 1827, Friedrich Wöhler refined a process discovered by Hans Christian Ørsted, a Danish chemist, who first produced impure aluminium in 1825. With the newly made Al metal, he established the specific gravity of aluminium in 1845.
