= Armand Gautier (chemist) =

French biochemist and dietitian

Emile Justin Armand Gautier
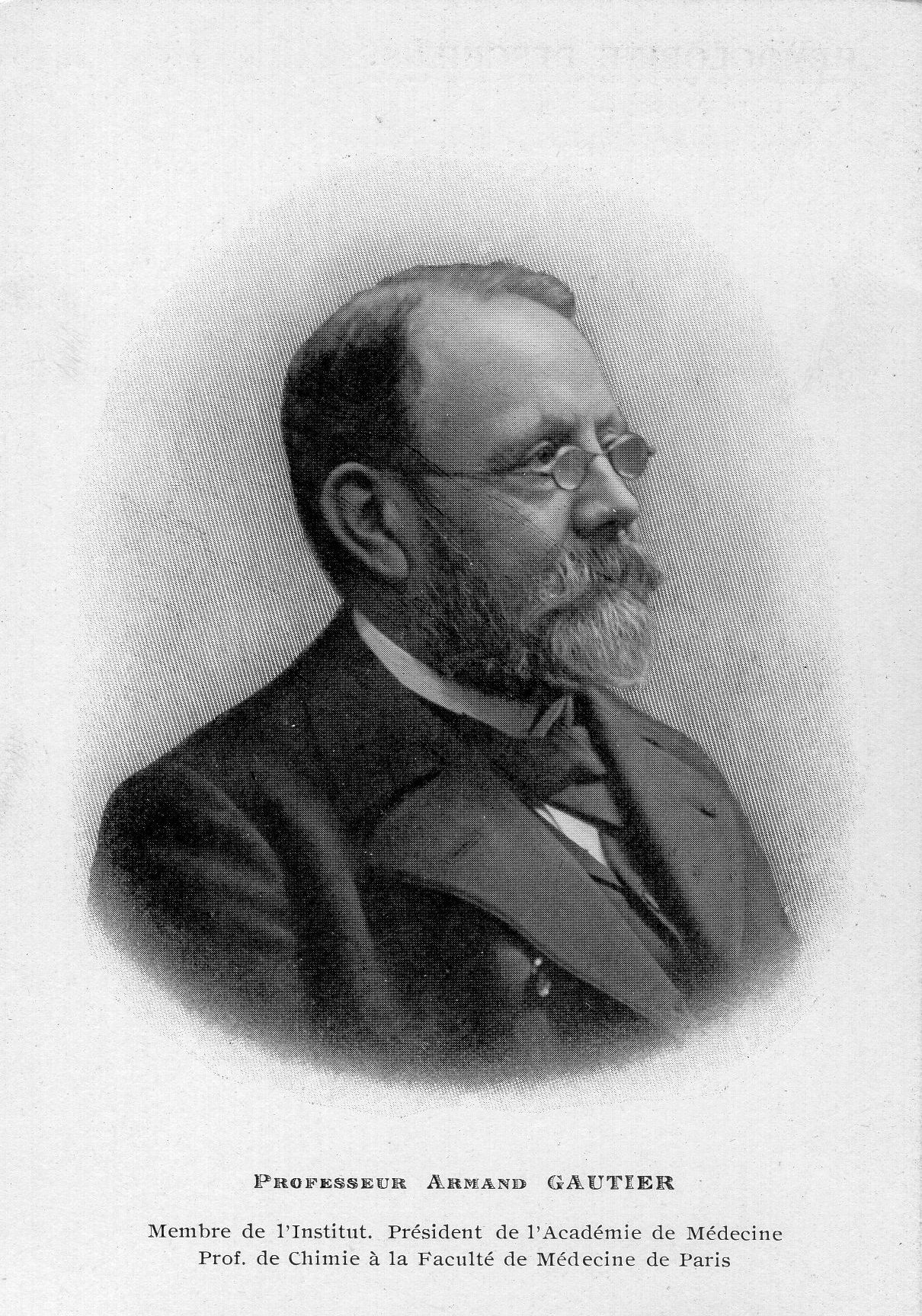
- Born: 23 September 1837; Narbonne
- Died: 27 July 1920 (aged 82); Cannes
- Occupations: Biochemist, dietitian
- Scientific career
- Thesis: Des nitriles des acides gras (1869)

Emile Justin Armand Gautier (23 September 1837, in Narbonne – 27 July 1920, in Cannes) was a French biochemist and dietitian.

== Chemistry ==
He studied medicine and sciences at the University of Montpellier, where from 1858 he worked as a préparateur of chemistry. In 1862 he received his medical doctorate in Paris, and for several years worked as an assistant under chemist Charles-Adolphe Wurtz. In 1869 he became an associate professor and assistant director in Henri Étienne Sainte-Claire Deville's laboratory at the Sorbonne, then from 1875 to 1884, he served as deputy director at the laboratory of chemical biology. In 1884 he succeeded Wurtz as professor of organic chemistry at the faculty of medicine in Paris.

In 1889 he became a member of the Académie des sciences, being elected as its president in 1911.

He is remembered for his discovery of carbylamines (1866) and his pioneer investigations of ptomaines. His work with arsenical compounds was important to the development of modern arsenic therapy.

== Dietetics ==
Gautier was a researcher of dietetics. He was President of the Société Scientifique d'Hygiène Alimentaire et d'Alimentation rationnelle de l'homme (Scientific Society for Alimentary Hygiene and the Rational Feeding of Man).

Gautier has been described as the "leading proponent of dietary reform in France." His master work was his 700 page text, Diet and Dietetics.

== Selected works ==
- La sophistication des vins. Méthodes analytiques et procédés pour reconnaître les fraudes, 1884 – The sophistication of wines: analytical methods and processes to recognize fraud.
- Cours de chimie minérale, organique et biologique, 3 volumes, 1887 – Lessons on inorganic, organic and biological chemistry.
- La chimie de la cellule vivante, 1895 – The chemistry of the living cell.
- Les toxines microbiennes et animales, 1896 – Microbial and animal toxins.
- L'alimentation et les régimes chez l'homme sain et chez les malades, 1904; translated into English and published as Diet and dietetics, (1906).
