= Ketyl =

Anion radical containing a group =C-O•

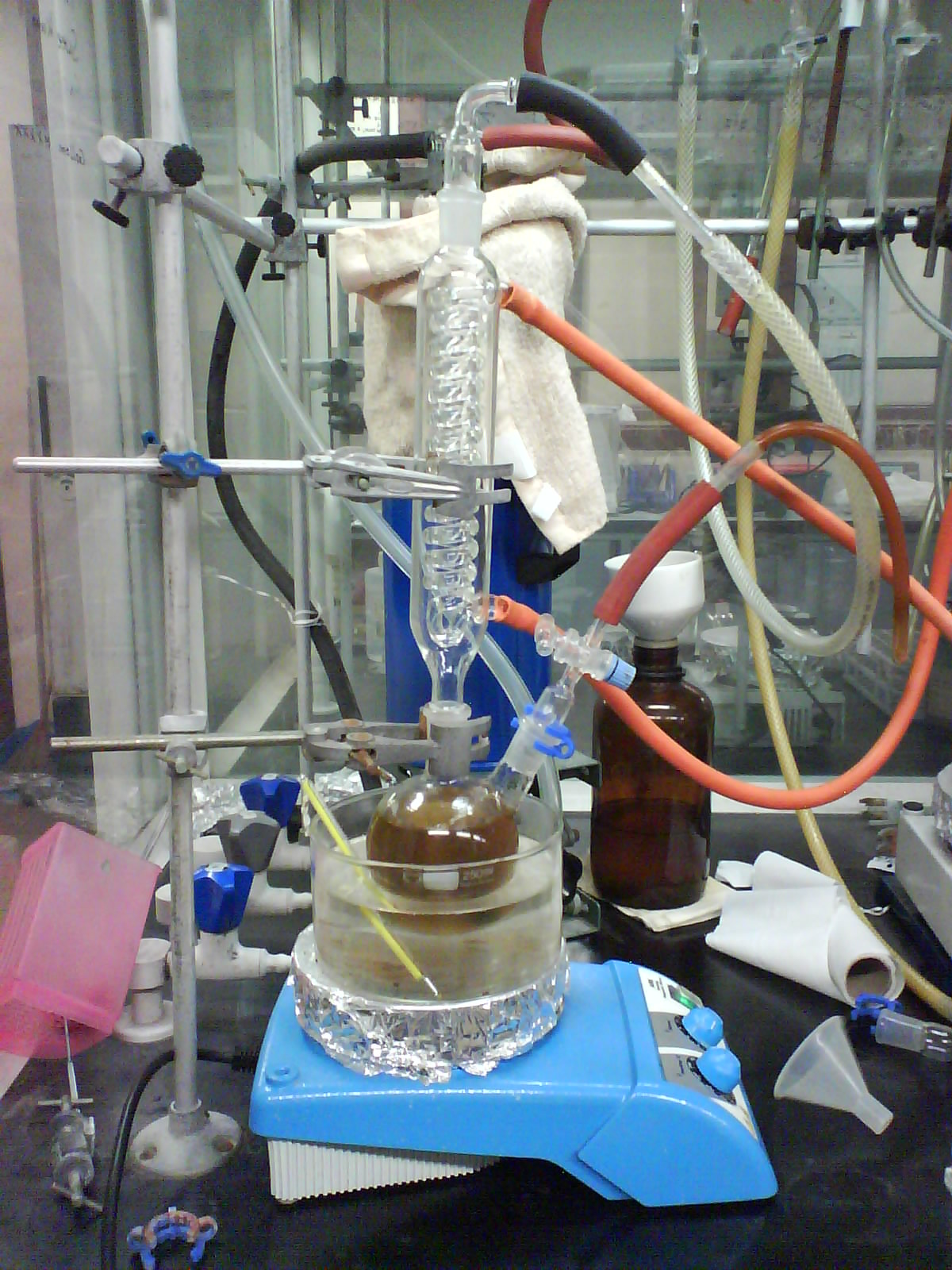
Before: Toluene is refluxed with sodium-benzophenone to dry and deoxygenate it.

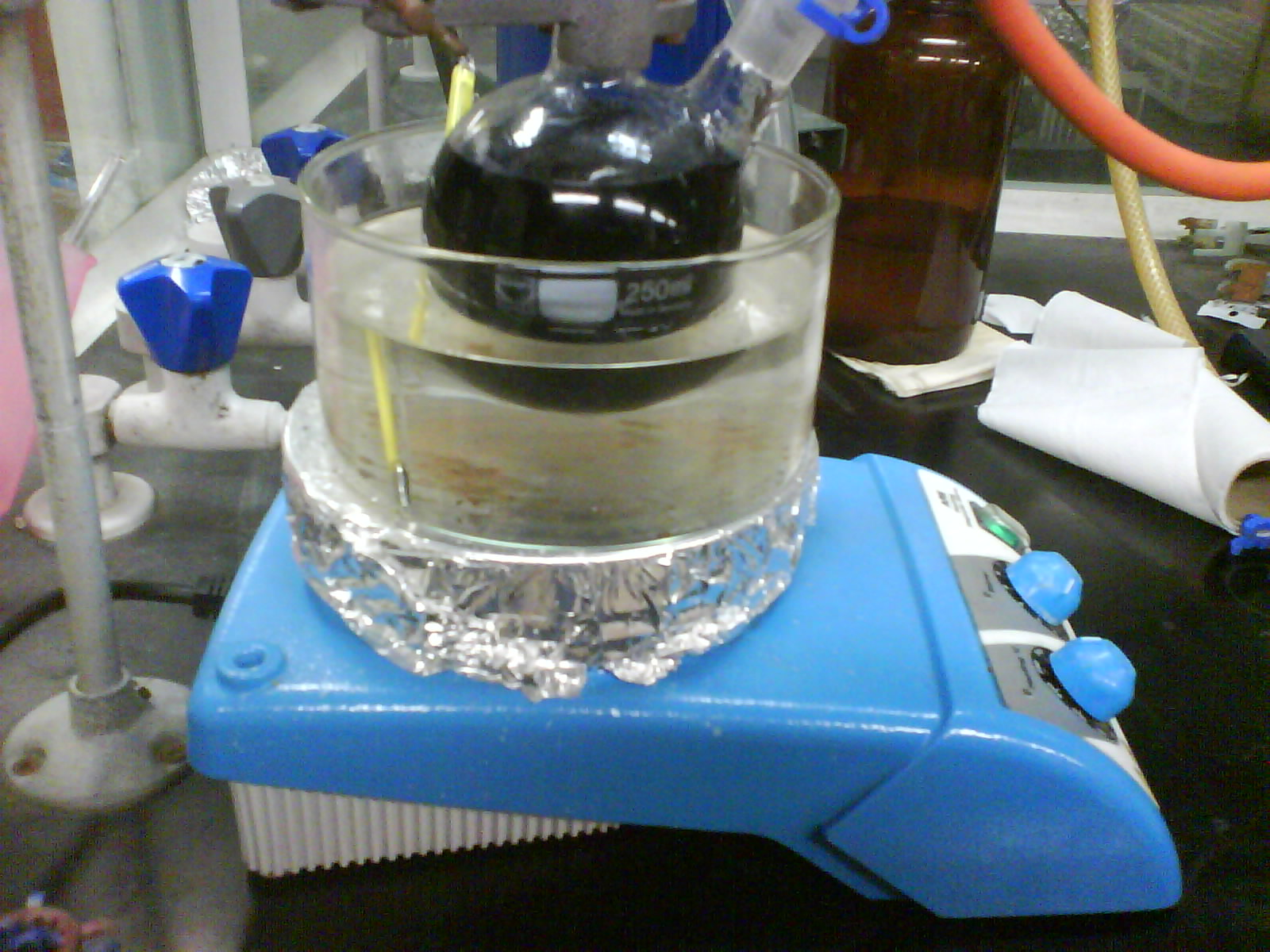
After: The deep blue coloration of the benzophenone ketyl radical shows that the toluene to be distilled is dry and oxygen-free.

A ketyl group in organic chemistry is an anion radical that contains a group R_{2}C^{−}O^{•}. It is the product of the 1-electron reduction of a ketone.

Another mesomeric structure has the radical position on carbon and the negative charge on oxygen.

Ketyls can be formed as radical anions by one-electron reduction of carbonyls with alkali metals. Sodium and potassium metal reduce benzophenone in THF solution to the soluble ketyl radical. Ketyls are also invoked as intermediates in the pinacol coupling reaction.

== Reactions ==
=== Water ===
The ketyl radicals derived from the reaction of sodium and benzophenone is a common laboratory desiccant. Ketyls react quickly with water, peroxides, and with oxygen. Thus, the deep purple coloration qualitatively indicates dry, peroxide-free, and oxygen-free conditions. The method for drying is still popular in many laboratories due to its ability to produce such pure solvent quickly. An alternative option for chemists interested only in water-free solvent is the use of molecular sieves. This is a much safer method than using an alkali metal still, produces solvent as dry as sodium-ketyl (though not as dry as potassium, or potassium-sodium alloy) but takes longer.

=== PTFE ===
Ketyl radicals slowly defluorinate polytetrafluoroethylene, turning it black and etching it.

=== Oxygen ===
Sodium benzophenone ketyl reacts with oxygen to give sodium benzoate and sodium phenoxide.

=== As a reducing agent ===
Potassium-benzophenone ketyl is used as a reductant for the preparation of organoiron compounds.

=== Further reduction ===
When excess alkali metal is present, benzophenone ketyl may be reduced to the ketone dianion, resulting in a color transformation from deep blue to purple:

M + M^{+}Ph_{2}CO^{•}^{−} → (M^{+})_{2}(Ph_{2}CO)^{2−}

== See also ==
- Air-free technique
- Benzophenone radical anion
