= Friedrich Wöhler =

German chemist (1800–1882)

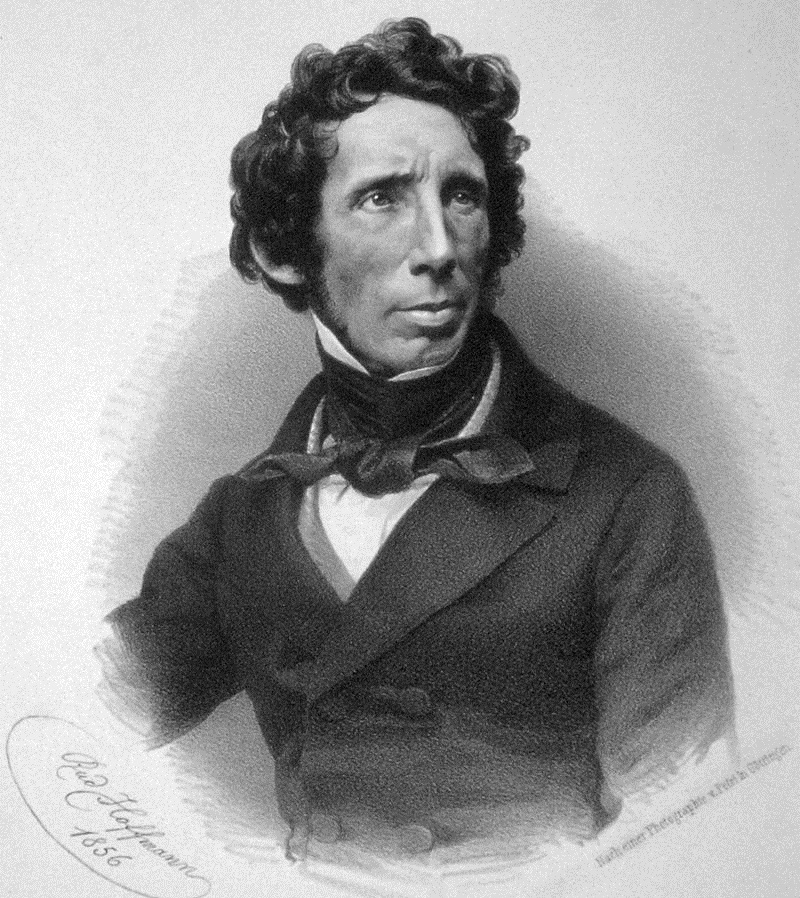
- Friedrich Wöhler, c. 1856
- Born: 31 July 1800; Eschersheim, Landgraviate of Hesse-Kassel, Holy Roman Empire (now Frankfurt-Eschersheim, Hesse, Germany)
- Died: 23 September 1882 (aged 82); Göttingen, Province of Hanover, Kingdom of Prussia, German Empire
- Education: Heidelberg University
- Known for: Organic chemistry Benzoin condensation Cocrystal; Discovery of sodium tungsten bronze Hydroquinone; Isocyanic acid Isolation of beryllium Isolation of yttrium Isomerism; Wöhler synthesis Wöhler process
- Spouses: Franziska Maria Wöhler (m. 1828; died 1832); Julie Pfeiffer (m. 1834)
- Children: 6
- Awards: Cothenius Medal (1880); Copley Medal (1872); Pour le Mérite (1864); ForMemRS (1854)
- Scientific career
- Fields: Organic chemistry Biochemistry
- Workplaces: Berliner Gewerbeschule; Höhere Gewerbeschule at Kassel; University of Göttingen
- Doctoral advisor: Leopold Gmelin; Jöns Jakob Berzelius
- Doctoral students: Heinrich Limpricht; Rudolph Fittig; Adolph Wilhelm Hermann Kolbe; Georg Ludwig Carius; Albert Niemann; Vojtěch Šafařík; Carl Schmidt; Bernhard Tollens; Theodor Zincke
- Other notable students: Augustus Voelcker; Wilhelm Kühne; James Curtis Booth

Friedrich Wöhler FRS(For) HonFRSE (German: [ˈvøːlɐ]; 31 July 1800 – 23 September 1882) was a German chemist known for his work in both organic and inorganic chemistry, being the first to isolate the chemical elements beryllium and yttrium in pure metallic form. He was the first to prepare several inorganic compounds, including silane and silicon nitride.

Wöhler is also known for seminal contributions in organic chemistry, in particular, the Wöhler synthesis of urea. His synthesis of the organic compound urea in the laboratory from inorganic substances contradicted the belief that organic compounds could only be produced by living organisms due to a "life force" known as vitalism. However, the exact extent of Wöhler's role in diminishing the belief in vitalism is considered by some to be questionable.

== Biography ==
Friedrich Wöhler was born in Eschersheim, Germany, on 31 July 1800. He was the son of a veterinarian. As a boy, he showed interest in mineral collecting, drawing, and science. His secondary education was at the Frankfurt Gymnasium. During his time at the gymnasium, Wöhler began chemical experimentation in a home laboratory provided by his father. He began his higher education at Marburg University in 1820.

On 2 September 1823, Wöhler passed his examinations as a Doctor of Medicine, Surgery, and Obstetrics at Heidelberg University, having studied in the laboratory of chemist Leopold Gmelin. Gmelin encouraged him to focus on chemistry and arranged for Wöhler to conduct research under the direction of chemist Jacob Berzelius in Stockholm, Sweden. Wöhler's time in Stockholm with Berzelius marked the beginning of a long personal and professional relationship between the two scientists. Wöhler translated many of Berzelius's scientific writings into German for international publication. In his lifetime, Wöhler wrote about 275 books, editions, and papers.

From 1826 to 1831, Wöhler taught chemistry at the Gewerbeschule in Berlin. From 1831 until 1836, he taught at the Höhere Gewerbeschule at Kassel. In the spring of 1836, Wöhler became Friedrich Stromeyer's successor as an Ordinary Professor of Chemistry at the University of Göttingen, where he occupied the chair of chemistry for 46 years, until his death in 1882. During his time at Göttingen approximately 8000 research students were trained in his laboratory. In 1834, he was elected a foreign member of the Royal Swedish Academy of Sciences.

== Contributions to chemistry ==
=== Inorganic chemistry ===
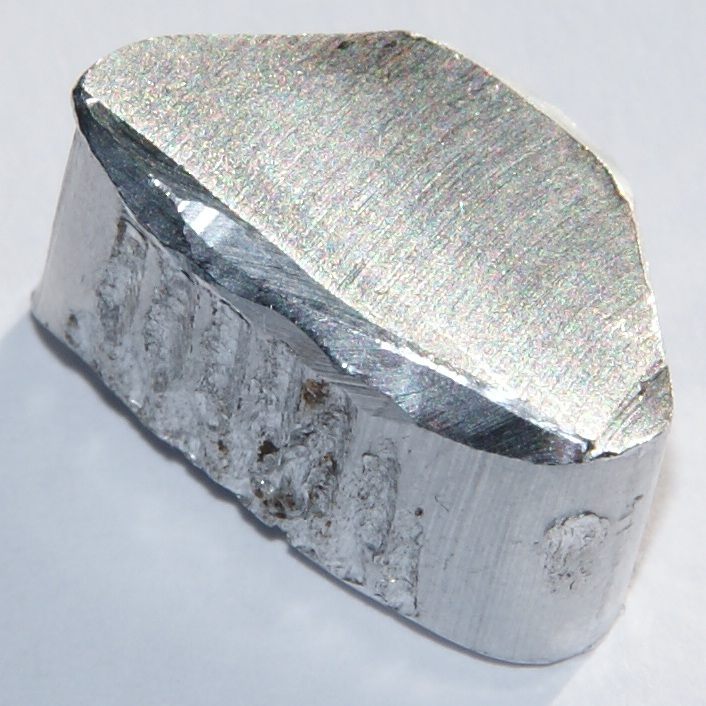
A sample of aluminium

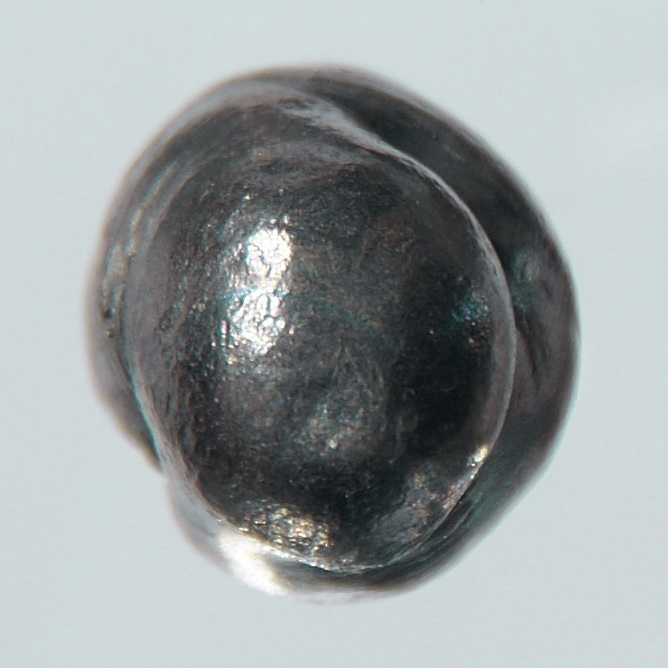
A sample of beryllium in elemental form

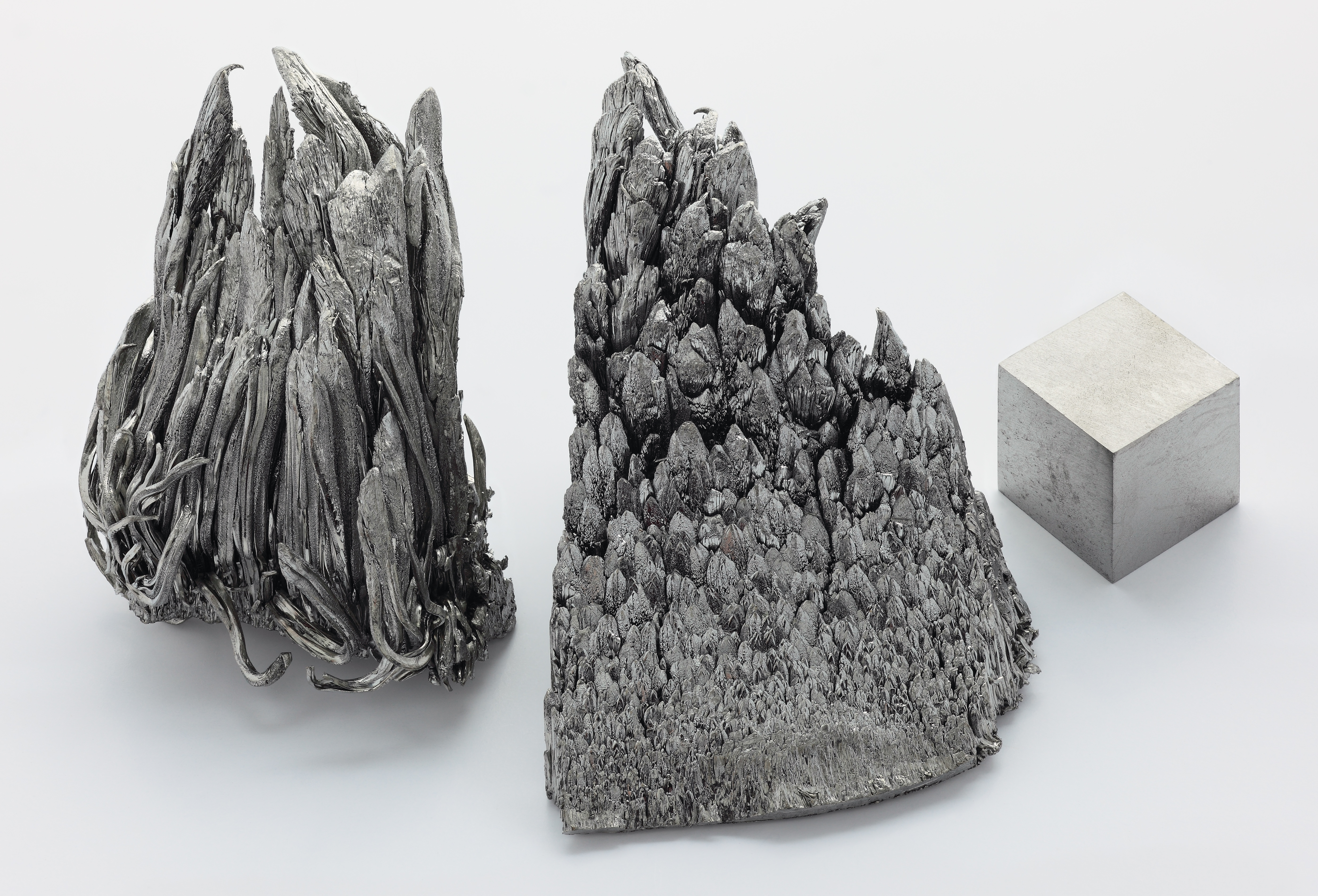
Samples of yttrium in elemental form

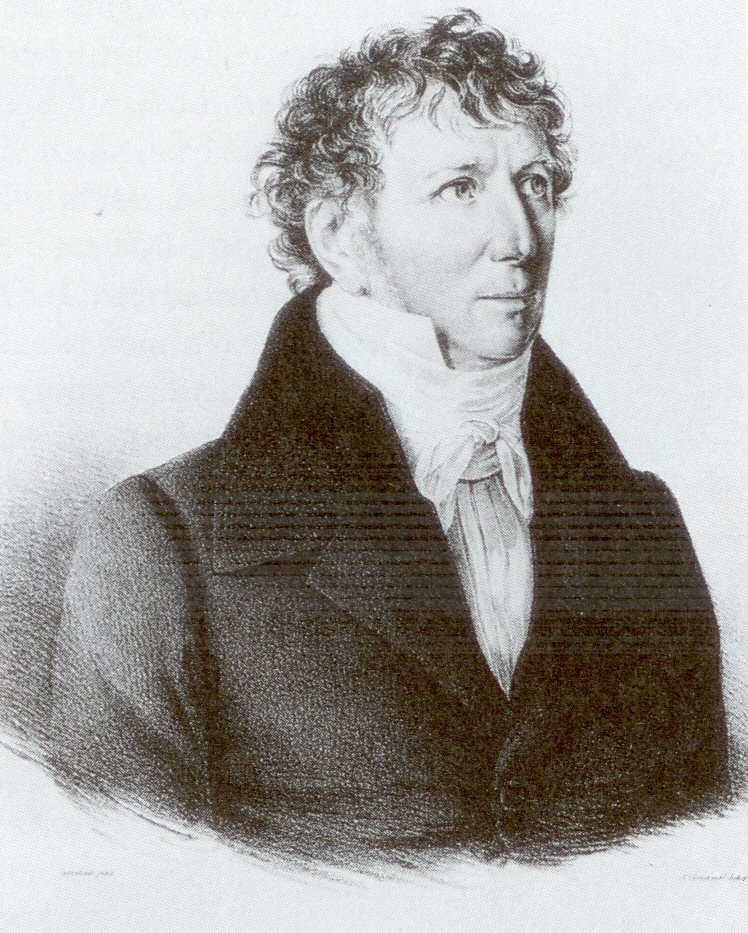
August Anton Wöhler, father of Friedrich Wöhler

Wöhler investigated more than twenty‐five chemical elements during his career. Hans Christian Ørsted was the first to separate the element aluminium in 1825, using a reduction of aluminium chloride with a potassium amalgam. Although Ørsted published his findings on the isolation of aluminium in the form of small particles, no other investigators successfully replicated his findings until 1936. Ørsted is now credited with discovering aluminium. Ørsted's findings on aluminium preparation were developed further by Wöhler, with Ørsted's permission. Wöhler modified Ørsted's methods, substituting potassium metal for potassium amalgam for the reduction of aluminium chloride. Using this improved method, Wöhler isolated aluminium powder in pure form on 22 October 1827. He showed that the aluminium powder could convert to solid balls of pure metallic aluminium in 1845. For this work, Wöhler is credited with the first isolation of aluminium in pure form.

In 1828, Wöhler was the first to isolate the element beryllium in pure metallic form (also independently isolated by Antoine Bussy). In the same year, he became the first to isolate the element yttrium in pure metallic form. He achieved these preparations by heating the anhydrous chlorides of beryllium and yttrium with potassium metal.

In 1850, Wöhler determined that what was believed until then to be metallic titanium was a mixture of titanium, carbon, and nitrogen, from which he derived the purest form isolated to that time. (Elemental titanium was later isolated in completely pure form in 1910 by Matthew A. Hunter.) He also developed a chemical synthesis of calcium carbide and silicon nitride.

Wöhler, working with French chemist Sainte Claire Deville, isolated the element boron in a crystalline form. He also isolated the element silicon in a crystalline form. Crystalline forms of these two elements were previously unknown. In 1856, working with Heinrich Buff, Wöhler prepared the inorganic compound silane (SiH_{4}). He prepared the first samples of boron nitride by melting together boric acid and potassium cyanide. He also developed a method for the preparation of calcium carbide.

Wöhler had an interest in the chemical composition of meteorites. He showed that some meteoric stones contain organic matter. He analyzed meteorites, and for many years wrote the digest on the literature of meteorites in the Jahresberichte über die Fortschritte der Chemie. Wöhler accumulated the best private collection of meteoric stones and irons that existed.

=== Organic chemistry ===
In 1832, lacking his own laboratory facilities at Kassel, Wöhler worked with Justus Liebig in his Giessen laboratory. In that year, Wöhler and Liebig published an investigation of the oil of bitter almonds. Through their detailed analysis of the chemical composition of this oil, they proved by their experiments that a group of carbon, hydrogen, and oxygen atoms can behave chemically as if it were the equivalent of a single atom, take the place of an atom in a chemical compound, and be exchanged for other atoms in chemical compounds. Specifically, their research on the oil of bitter almonds showed that a group of elements with the chemical composition C_{7}H_{5}O can be thought of as a single functional group, which came to be known as a benzoyl radical. In this way, the investigations of Wöhler and Liebig established a new concept in organic chemistry referred to as compound radicals, which had a profound influence on the development of organic chemistry. Many more functional groups were later identified by subsequent investigators with wide utility in chemistry.

Liebig and Wöhler explored the concept of chemical isomerism, the idea that two chemical compounds with identical chemical compositions could be different substances because of different arrangements of the atoms in the chemical structure. Aspects of chemical isomerism originated in the research of Berzelius. Liebig and Wöhler investigated silver fulminate and silver cyanate. These two compounds have the same chemical composition yet are chemically different. Silver fulminate is explosive, while silver cyanate is a stable compound. Liebig and Wöhler recognized these as examples of structural isomerism, which was a significant advance in understanding chemical isomerism.

Wöhler has also been regarded as a pioneering researcher in organic chemistry as a result of his 1828 demonstration of the laboratory synthesis of urea from ammonium cyanate, in a chemical reaction that came to be known as the "Wöhler synthesis". Urea and ammonium cyanate are further examples of structural isomers of chemical compounds. Heating ammonium cyanate converts it into urea, which is its isomer. In a letter to Swedish chemist Jöns Jacob Berzelius the same year, he wrote:

"In a manner of speaking, I can no longer hold my chemical water. I must tell you that I can make urea without the use of kidneys, or indeed of any animal, be it man or dog. I found that whenever one tries to join cyanic acid and ammonia, a crystalline substance is produced, which [...] fails to react like cyanic acid or ammonia [...], so it required nothing more than a comparative study of urea from piss, which I had in all aspects produced myself, and the cyanic urea. If [...] no product was yielded other than urea, urea from piss had to have the precisely same composition as cyanic ammonia, after all. And this is indeed the case."

Wöhler synthesis of urea by heating ammonium cyanate. The Δ sign indicates the addition of heat.

Wöhler's demonstration of urea synthesis has become regarded as a refutation of vitalism, the hypothesis that living things are alive because of some special "vital force". It was the beginning of the end for one popular vitalist hypothesis, the idea that "organic" compounds could be made only by living things. In responding to Wöhler, Jöns Jakob Berzelius acknowledged that Wöhler's results were highly significant for the understanding of organic chemistry, calling the findings a "jewel" for Wöhler's "laurel wreath". Both scientists also recognized the work's importance to the study of isomerism, a new area of research.

Wöhler's role in overturning vitalism is said to have become exaggerated over time. This tendency can be traced back to Hermann Kopp's History of Chemistry (in four volumes, 1843–1847). He emphasized the importance of Wöhler's research as a refutation of vitalism but ignored its importance in understanding chemical isomerism, setting a tone for subsequent writers. The notion that Wöhler single-handedly overturned vitalism also gained popularity after it appeared in a popular history of chemistry published in 1931, which, "ignoring all pretense of historical accuracy, turned Wöhler into a crusader".

Contrary to what was thought in Wöhler's time, cyanate is not a purely inorganic anion, as it is formed in various metabolic pathways. Thus the conversion of ammonium cyanate into urea was not an example of production of an organic compound from an inorganic precursor.

== Education reform ==
Once Wöhler became a professor at the University of Göttingen, students traveled from around the world to be instructed by him. Wöhler saw particular success in his students after giving them hands-on experience in the lab. This practice was later adopted around the world, becoming the chemistry lab co-requisite that is required at most universities today.

Wöhler also allowed his students to participate and aid him in his research, which was not typical at the time. This practice became nearly universal, normalizing the undergraduate and graduate-level research that is a requirement for numerous degrees today.

== Final days and legacy ==
Wöhler's discoveries had a significant influence on the theoretical basis of chemistry. The journals of every year from 1820 to 1881 contain his original scientific contributions. The Scientific American supplement for 1882 stated that "for two or three of his researches he deserves the highest honor a scientific man can obtain, but the sum of his work is overwhelming. Had he never lived, the aspect of chemistry would be very different from that it is now".

Wöhler's notable research students included chemists Georg Ludwig Carius, Heinrich Limpricht, Rudolph Fittig, Adolph Wilhelm Hermann Kolbe, Albert Niemann, Vojtěch Šafařík, Wilhelm Kühne, and Augustus Voelcker.

Wöhler was elected a Fellow of the Royal Society of London in 1854. He was an Honorary Fellow of the Royal Society of Edinburgh. In 1862, Wöhler was elected a member of the American Philosophical Society.

The Life and Work of Friedrich Wöhler (1800–1882) (2005) by Robin Keen is considered to be "the first detailed scientific biography" of Wöhler.

On the 100th anniversary of Wöhler's death, the West German government issued a stamp depicting the structure of urea with its synthesis formula listed directly below.

== Family ==
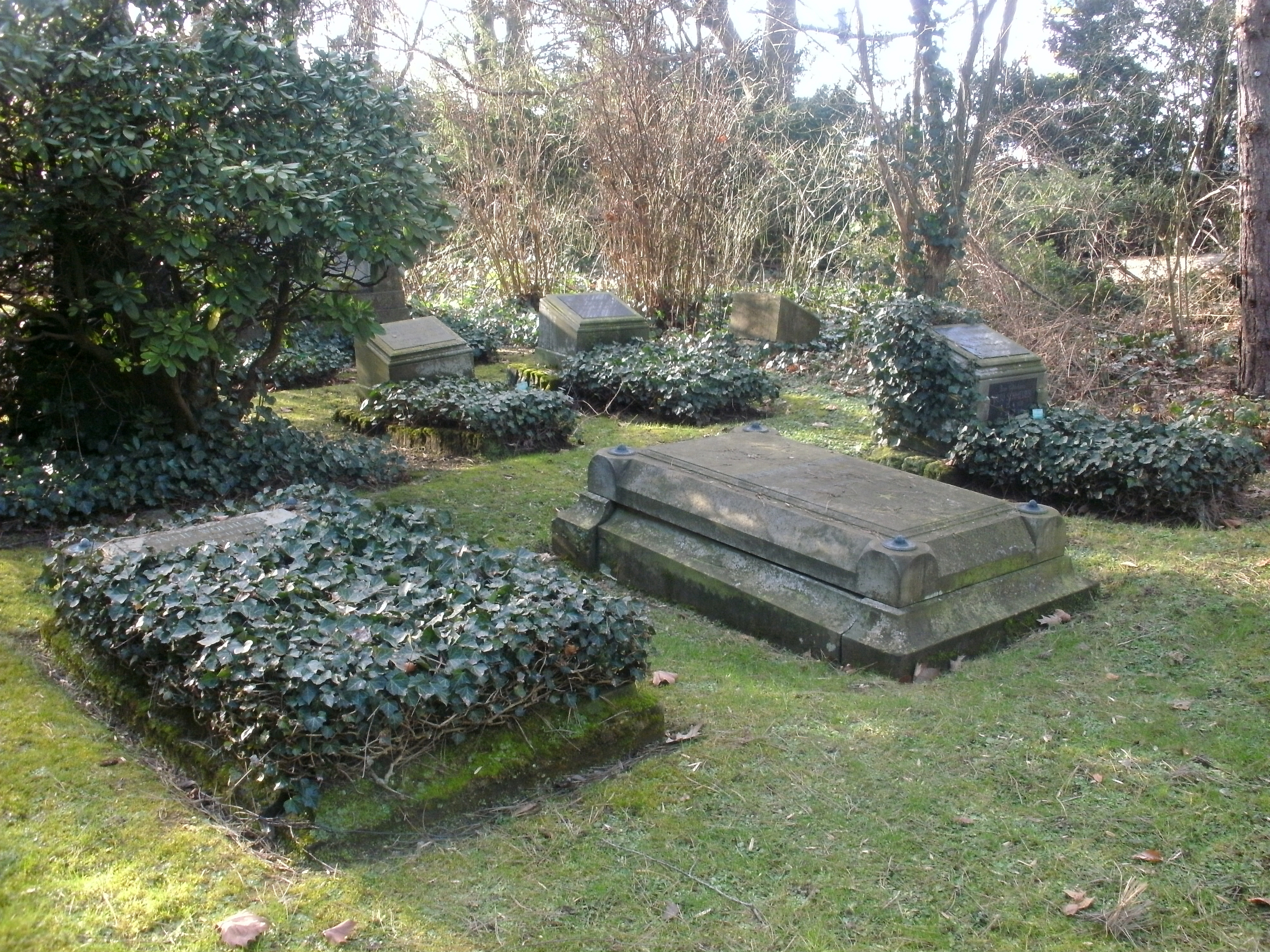
Grave of Friedrich Wöhler

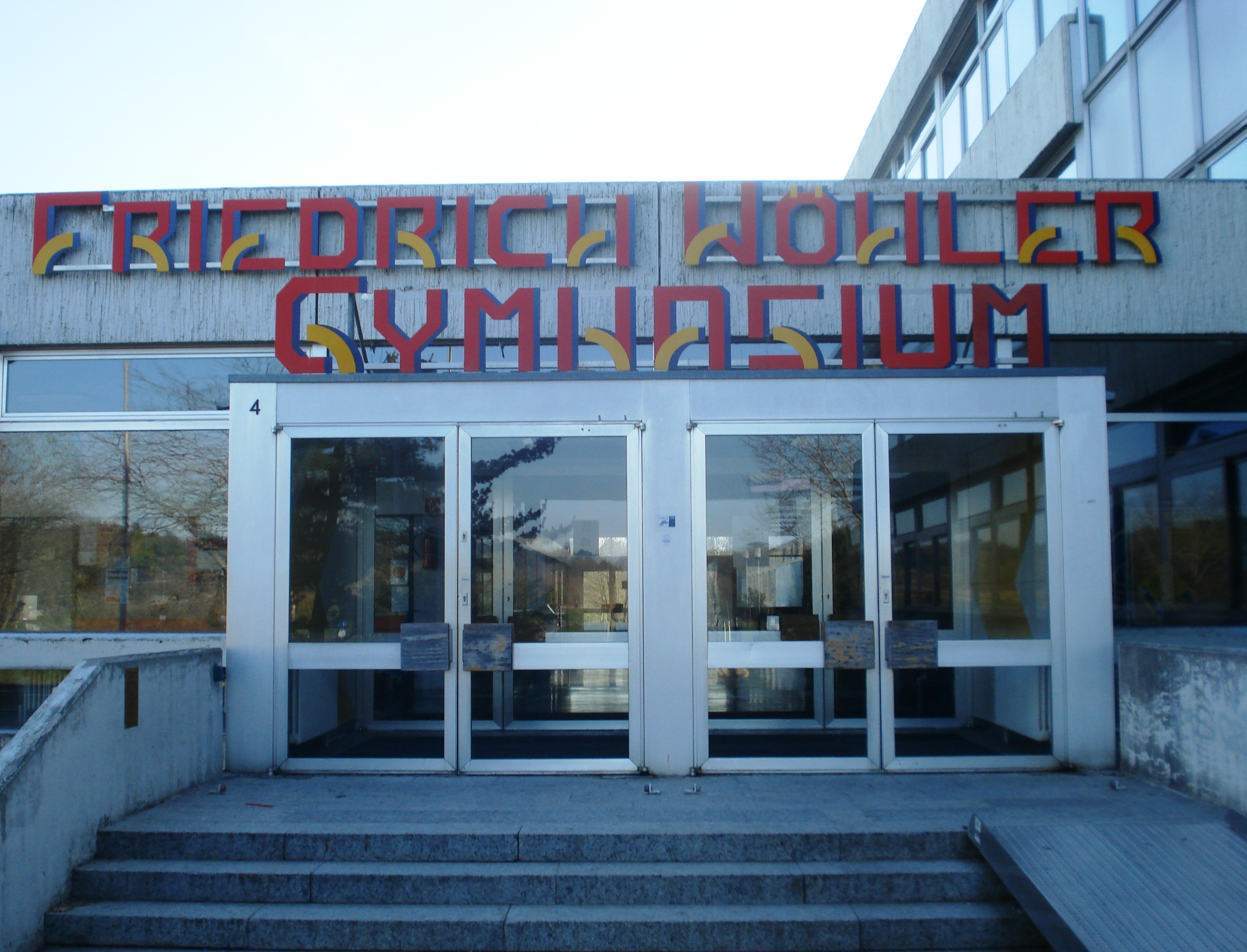
Friedrich-Wöhler-Gymnasium in Singen-Haupteingang

Wöhler's first marriage was in 1828, to his cousin Franziska Maria Wöhler (1811–1832). The couple had two children, a son (August) and a daughter (Sophie). After Franziska's death, he married Julie Pfeiffer (1813–1886) in 1834, with whom he had four daughters: Fanny, Helene, Emilie, and Pauline.

== Further works ==
Further works from Wöhler:

- Lehrbuch der Chemie, Dresden, 1825, 4 vols, OCLC 5150170
- Grundriss der Anorganischen Chemie, Berlin, 1830, OCLC 970005145
- Grundriss der Chemie, Berlin, 1837–1858 Vol. 1 & 2 (digital edition) by the University and State Library Düsseldorf
- Grundriss der Organischen Chemie, Berlin, 1840
- Praktische Übungen in der Chemischen Analyse, Berlin, 1854, OCLC 254555919
- Early Recollections of a Chemist, 1875
- Nuovo Cimento, 1855-1868 Vol. 1-28

== See also ==
- Benzoin condensation
- History of aluminium
- Stanley Miller
- Hilaire Marin Rouelle
- Kassel
- Structural Isomer
