= Migratory aptitude =

Migratory aptitude is the relative ability of a migrating group to migrate in a rearrangement reaction. Migratory aptitudes vary in different reactions, depending on multiple factors.

In the Baeyer-Villiger reaction, the more substituted group, in general, migrates. In the pinacol rearrangement, the order of migratory aptitude has not been determined unambiguously, but some trends have been determined. For example, relative migratory aptitudes for alkyl substituents is Hydride >C(CH_{3})_{3}> C_{2}H_{5} > phenyl > CH_{3}. More bulky groups have more tendency to migrate.
