= Heinrich Limpricht =

German chemist (1827–1909)

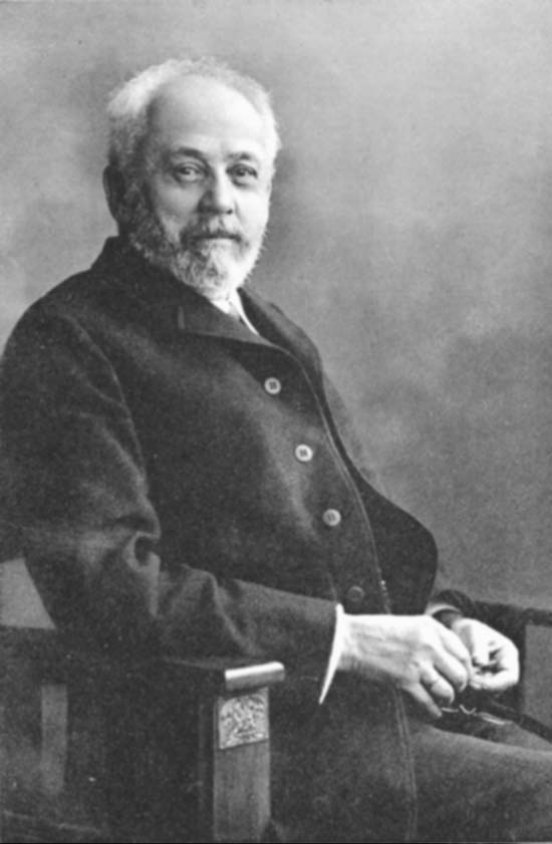
- Heinrich Limpricht
- Born: 21 April 1827; Eutin, Grand Duchy of Oldenburg
- Died: 13 May 1909 (aged 82); Greifswald, German Empire
- Education: University of Göttingen
- Scientific career
- Fields: Chemist
- Workplaces: University of Göttingen; University of Greifswald
- Doctoral advisor: Friedrich Wöhler
- Doctoral students: Friedrich Konrad Beilstein; Wilhelm Rudolph Fittig

Heinrich Limpricht (21 April 1827 – 13 May 1909) was a German chemist. Limpricht was a pupil of Friedrich Wöhler; he worked on the chemistry of furans and pyrroles, discovering furan in 1870.

In 1852 he became lecturer and in 1855 extraordinary professor at the University of Göttingen. In 1860, he became ordinary professor at the Institute for Organic Chemistry at the University of Greifswald. His oldest daughter Marie (1856–1925) married in 1875 to Protestant theologian Julius Wellhausen.

Rudolph Fittig and Hans von Pechmann were two of Limpricht's notable pupils.
