= Pinacol rearrangement =

Rearrangement reaction in organic chemistry

The pinacol–pinacolone rearrangement is a method for converting a 1,2-diol to a carbonyl compound in organic chemistry. The 1,2-rearrangement takes place under acidic conditions. The name of the rearrangement reaction comes from the rearrangement of pinacol to pinacolone.

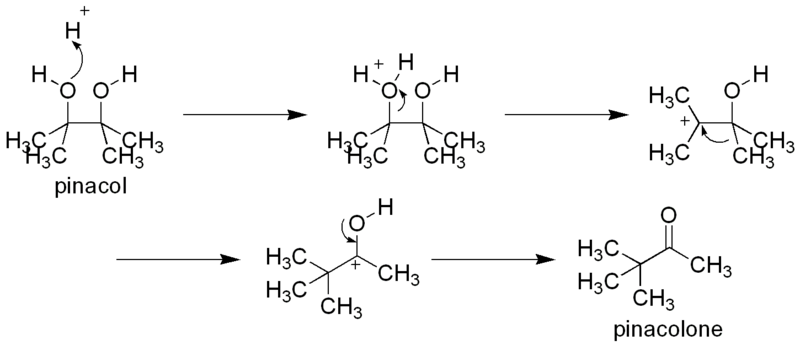

This reaction was first described by Wilhelm Rudolph Fittig (known for the Fittig reaction) in 1860.

== Mechanism ==
In the course of this organic reaction, protonation of one of the –OH groups occurs and a carbocation is formed. If the –OH groups are not alike (i.e. the pinacol is asymmetrical), then the one which creates a more stable carbocation participates in the reaction. Subsequently, an alkyl group from the adjacent carbon migrates to the carbocation center.

The driving force for this rearrangement step is believed to be the relative stability of the resultant oxonium ion. Although the initial carbocation is already tertiary, the oxygen can stabilize the positive charge much more favorably due to the complete octet configuration at all centers. It can also be seen as the -OH's lone pairs pushing an alkyl group off as seen in the asymmetrical pinacol example. The migration of alkyl groups in this reaction occurs in accordance with their usual migratory aptitude, i.e.phenyl carbocation > hydride > tertiary carbocation (if formed by migration) > secondary carbocation (if formed by migration) > methyl carbocation. {Why carbocation? Because every migratory group leaves by taking electron pair with it.} The conclusion is that the group which stabilizes the carbocation more effectively is migrated.

=== Example of asymmetrical pinacol rearrangement ===
When a pinacol is not symmetrical, there is a choice for which hydroxyl group will leave and which alkyl shift will occur. The selectivity will be determined by the stability of the carbocations. In this case although both choices are tertiary, the phenyl groups result in significantly higher stabilization of the positive charge through resonance.

== Stereochemistry of the rearrangement ==
In cyclic systems, the reaction presents more features of interest. In these reactions, the stereochemistry of the diol plays a crucial role in deciding the major product. An alkyl group which is situated trans- to the leaving –OH group may migrate to the carbocation center, but cis- alkyl groups migrate at a very low rate. In the absence of trans- alkyl groups, ring contraction may occur as the major product instead, i.e. the ring carbon itself may migrate. This reveals another interesting feature of the reaction, viz. that it is largely concerted. There appears to be a connection between the migration origin and migration terminus throughout the reaction.

Moreover, if the migrating alkyl group has a chiral center as its key atom, the configuration at this center is retained even after migration takes place.

== History ==
Although Fittig first published about the pinacol rearrangement, it was not Fittig but Aleksandr Butlerov who correctly identified the reaction products involved.

In an 1859 publication Wilhelm Rudolph Fittig described the reaction of acetone with potassium metal. Fittig wrongly assumed a molecular formula of (C_{3}H_{3}O)_{n} for acetone, the result of a long-standing atomic weight debate finally settled at the Karlsruhe Congress in 1860. He also wrongly believed acetone to be an alcohol which he hoped to prove by forming a metal alkoxide salt. The reaction product he obtained instead he called paraceton which he believed to be an acetone dimer. In his second publication in 1860 he reacted paraceton with sulfuric acid (the actual pinacol rearrangement).

Again Fittig was unable to assign a molecular structure to the reaction product which he assumed to be another isomer or a polymer. Contemporary chemists who had already adapted to the new atomic weight reality did not fare better. One of them, Charles Friedel, believed the reaction product to be the epoxide tetramethylethylene oxide in analogy with reactions of ethylene glycol. Finally Butlerov in 1873 came up with the correct structures after he independently synthesised the compound trimethylacetic (pivalic) acid which Friedel had obtained earlier by oxidizing with a dichromate.

Some of the problems during the determination of the structure are because carbon skeletal rearrangements were unknown at that time and therefore the new concept had to be found. Butlerov theory allowed the structure of carbon atoms in the molecule to rearrange and with this concept a structure for pinacolone could be found.

== See also ==
- Benzilic acid rearrangement
- Semipinacol rearrangement
- Tiffeneau–Demjanov rearrangement
