= Semipinacol rearrangement =

Rearrangement reaction in organic chemistry

The semipinacol rearrangement is a rearrangement reaction in organic chemistry involving a heterosubstituted alcohol of the type R_{1}R_{2}(HO)C–C(X)R_{3}R_{4}. The hetero substituent can be a halogen (Cl, Br, I), a tosylate, a mesylate or a thiol group. This reaction proceeds by removal of the leaving group X forming a carbocation as electron deficient center. One of the adjacent alkyl groups then migrates to the positive carbon in a 1,2-shift. Simultaneously with the shift, a pi bond forms from the oxygen to carbon, assisting in driving the migrating group off its position. The result is a ketone or aldehyde. In another definition all semipinacol rearrangements "share a common reactive species in which an electrophilic carbon center, including but not limited to carbocations, is vicinal to an oxygen-containing carbon and can drive the 1,2-migration of a C–C or C–H bond to terminate the process, generating a carbonyl group ".

The semipinacol rearrangement has been defined as "any process reminiscent of a pinacol rearrangement that utilizes a nondiol-based starting material."

The rearrangement reaction can be classified into 4 types. Type 1 concerns all 2-heterosubstituted alcohols. Substrates in type 2 rearrangements are allyl alcohols. The carbocation is formed by electrophilic addition to the alkene group with electrophiles such as halonium ions, Brønsted acids and Lewis acids. In type 3 the substrates are epoxides, notably 2,3-epoxy-alcohols and type 4 concerns the reactions of alpha hydroxyketones and alpha hydroxy imines. Reactions of type 4 are also called acyloin rearrangements.

While similar to the pinacol rearrangement, the semipinacol rearrangement differs from the pinacol rearrangement in that the cation is not formed from a vicinal 1,2-diol. With diazoalcohols the reaction is known as the Tiffeneau–Demjanov rearrangement.
