= Pinacolone =

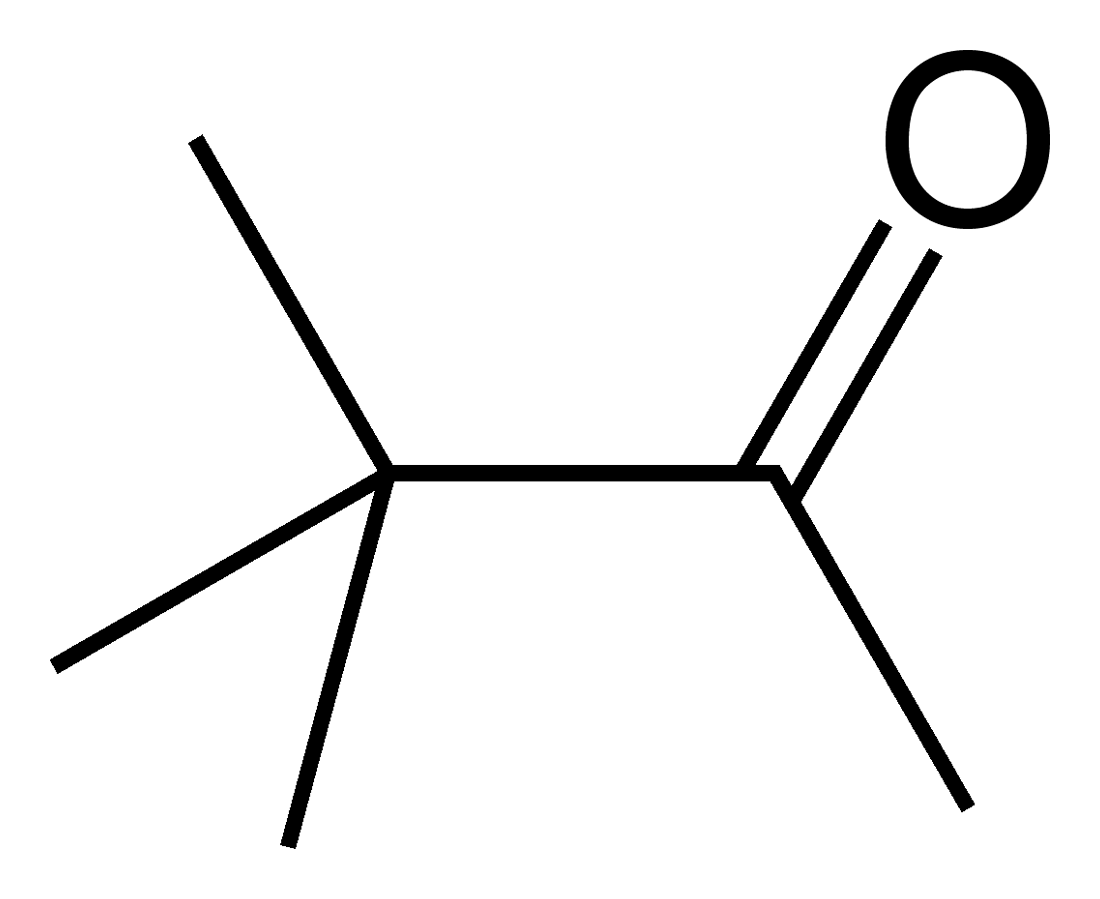
Skeletal formula of pinacolone
Skeletal formula
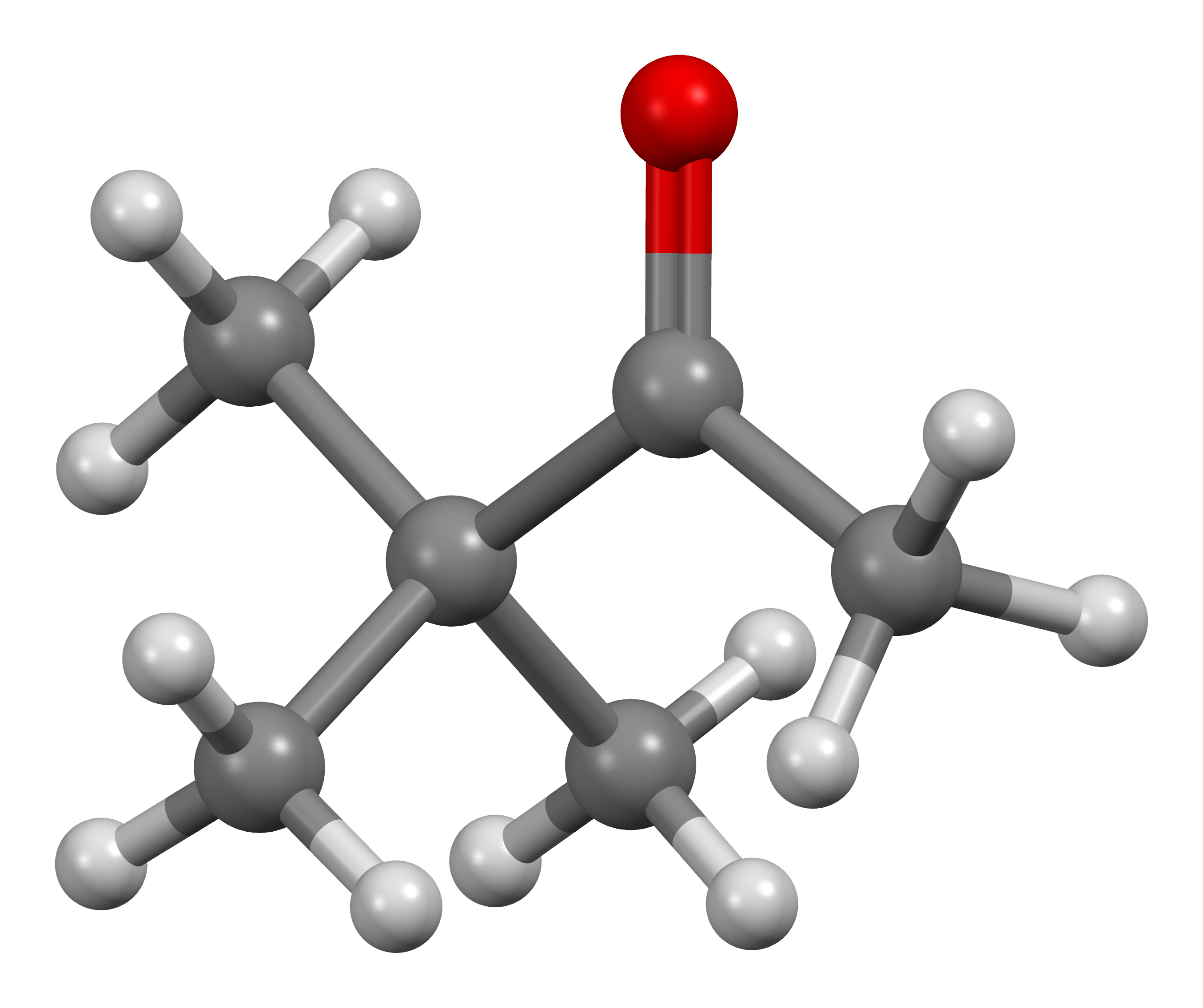
Ball-and-stick model

Names
- Preferred IUPAC name 3,3-Dimethylbutan-2-one
- Other names t-Butyl methyl ketone 1,1,1-Trimethylacetone t-BuAc

Identifiers
CAS Number	75-97-8
3D model (JSmol)	Interactive image
Beilstein Reference	1209331
ChEBI	CHEBI:197349
ChemSpider	6176
ECHA InfoCard	100.000.838
EC Number	200-920-4
MeSH	Pinacolone
PubChem CID	6416
RTECS number	EL7700000
UNII	3U1AAG3528
UN number	1224
CompTox Dashboard (EPA)	DTXSID5021752
- InChI: InChI=1S/C6H12O/c1-5(7)6(2,3)4/h1-4H3 Key: PJGSXYOJTGTZAV-UHFFFAOYSA-N
- SMILES: CC(=O)C(C)(C)C

Properties
Chemical formula	C_{6}H_{12}O
Molar mass	100.161 g·mol^{−1}
Appearance	Colorless liquid
Density	0.801 g cm^{−3}
Melting point	−52 °C (−62 °F; 221 K)
Boiling point	103 to 106 °C (217 to 223 °F; 376 to 379 K)
Magnetic susceptibility (χ)	−69.86·10^{−6} cm^{3}/mol

Hazards
- GHS labelling
Pictograms	(GHS02: Flammable) (GHS07: Exclamation mark)
Signal word	Danger
Hazard statements	H225, H302, H315, H319, H332, H335, H412
Precautionary statements	P210, P233, P240, P241, P242, P243, P261, P264, P270, P271, P273, P280, P301+P312, P302+P352, P303+P361+P353, P304+P312, P304+P340, P305+P351+P338, P312, P321, P330, P332+P313, P337+P313, P362, P370+P378, P403+P233, P403+P235, P405, P501
NFPA 704 (fire diamond)	1 4 0
Flash point	5 °C (41 °F; 278 K)
Safety data sheet (SDS)	External MSDS
- Except where otherwise noted, data are given for materials in their standard state (at 25 °C [77 °F], 100 kPa). verify (what is ?) Infobox references

Pinacolone (3,3-dimethyl-2-butanone) is an important ketone in organic chemistry. It is a colorless liquid with a slight peppermint or camphor odor. The molecule is an asymmetrical ketone. The α-methyl group can participate in condensation reactions. The carbonyl group can undergo the usual reactions (hydrogenation, reductive amination, etc.). It is a Schedule 3 compound under the Chemical Weapons Convention 1993, due to being related to pinacolyl alcohol, which is used in the production of soman. It is also a controlled export in Australia Group member states.

== Preparation ==
Most famously, at least in the classroom, pinacolone arises by the pinacol rearrangement, which occurs by protonation of pinacol (2,3-dimethylbutane-2,3-diol).

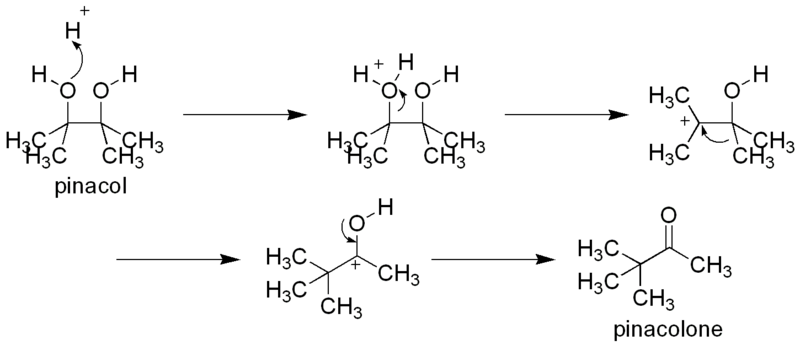

Industrially, pinacolone is made by the hydrolysis of 4,4,5-trimethyl-1,3-dioxane, which is the product of isoprene and formaldehyde via the Prins reaction. It also is generated by ketonization of pivalic acid and acetic acid or acetone over metal oxide catalysts. 3-Methylbutanal is a starting material for 2,3-dimethyl-2-butene, which in turn is converted to pinacolone. Pinacolone can also be produced from 2-methy-2-butanol when reacted with C5 alcohols.

Isoamylene is another starting point for the synthesis of pinacolone.

== Uses ==
Pinacolone is produced in large amounts for use in fungicides, herbicides, and pesticides. Some derivatives include:

- Tebuconazole (Elite)
- Vibunazole and Bay-i 19139
- It is also used to prepare pinacidil, as well as naminidil.
- Stiripentol
- Tribuzone
- Pivaloylacetonitrile is used in the synthesis of doramapimod.
- Triadimefon, triadimenol, and nexinhib 20
- Bitertanol
- Paclobutrazol and diclobutrazole
- Valconazole
- Thiofanox
- Metribuzin

== See also ==
- Pinacol
- Pinacolyl alcohol
- Soman
