= Wurtz reaction =

Reaction in organic chemistry

Named after	Charles Adolphe Wurtz
Reaction type	Coupling reaction

Identifiers
Organic Chemistry Portal	wurtz-reaction

In organic chemistry, the Wurtz reaction, named after Charles Adolphe Wurtz, is a coupling reaction in which two alkyl halides are treated with sodium metal to form a higher alkane.

2 R−X + 2 Na → R−R + 2 NaX

The reaction is of little value because yields are low. Exceptions are some intramolecular versions, such as 1,2-dibromohexane + 2 Na → cyclohexene + 2 NaBr.

A related reaction, which combines alkyl halides with aryl halides is called the Wurtz–Fittig reaction. Despite its very modest utility, the Wurtz reaction is widely cited as representative of reductive coupling.

== Mechanism ==
The reaction proceeds by an initial metal–halogen exchange, which is described with the following idealized stoichiometry:

R−X + 2 M → RM + MX

This step may involve the intermediacy of radical species R·. The conversion resembles the formation of a Grignard reagent. The RM intermediates have been isolated in several cases. The radical is susceptible to diverse reactions. The organometallic intermediate (RM) next reacts with the alkyl halide (RX) forming a new carbon–carbon covalent bond.

RM + RX → R−R + MX

The process resembles an S_{N}2 reaction.

== Examples and reaction conditions ==
The reaction is intolerant of many common functional groups which would be attacked by the warm metallic sodium. For similar reasons, the reaction is always conducted in unreactive polar aprotic solvents such as tetrahydrofuran or dioxane. In efforts to improve the reaction yields, other metals have also been tested alone or in combination with sodium: silver, zinc, iron, activated copper, indium, as well as mixture of manganese and copper chlorides.

Wurtz coupling is considered useful in closing small, especially three-membered, rings. In the cases of 1,3-, 1,4-, 1,5-, and 1,6- dihalides, Wurtz-reaction conditions lead to formation of cyclic products, although yields are variable. Under Wurtz conditions, vicinal dihalides yield alkenes, whereas geminal dihalides convert to alkynes. Bicyclobutane was prepared this way from 1-bromo-3-chlorocyclobutane in 95% yield. The reaction is conducted in refluxing dioxane, at which temperature, the sodium is liquid.

== Extensions to main group compounds ==
Although the Wurtz reaction is only of limited value in organic synthesis, analogous couplings are useful for coupling main group halides. Hexamethyldisilane arises efficiently by treatment of trimethylsilyl chloride with sodium:

2 Me_{3}SiCl + 2 Na → Me_{3}Si−SiMe_{3} + 2 NaCl (Me = CH_{3})

Tetraphenyldiphosphine is prepared analogously:

2 Ph_{2}PCl + 2 Na → Ph_{2}P−PPh_{2} + 2 NaCl (Ph = C_{6}H_{5})

Triphenylarsine can also be prepared by combining arsenic trichloride, chlorobenzene, and sodium:

AsCl_{3} + 3 PhCl + 6 Na → AsPh_{3} + 6 NaCl

When applied to main group dihalides, rings and polymers result. Polysilanes and polystannanes are produced in this way

n Me_{2}SiCl_{2} + 2n Na → (Me_{2}Si)_{n} + 2n NaCl

== See also ==
- Wurtz–Fittig reaction
- Ullmann reaction
- Sandmeyer reaction
