= Charles Adolphe Wurtz =

French chemist (1817–1884)

Adolphe Wurtz
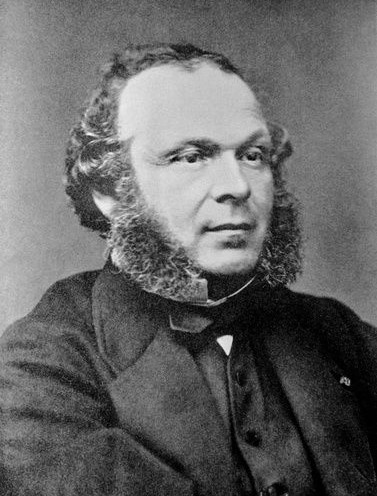
- Born: 26 November 1817; Strasbourg, France
- Died: 10 May 1884 (aged 66); Paris, France
- Education: University of Strasbourg
- Known for: Wurtz reaction
- Awards: Faraday Lectureship Prize (1879); Copley Medal (1881)
- Scientific career
- Fields: Chemistry
- Doctoral advisor: Amédée Cailliot
- Other academic advisors: Justus von Liebig
- Doctoral students: Charles Friedel; Armand Gautier
- Other notable students: Jacobus Henricus van 't Hoff; Alexander Zaytsev

Charles Adolphe Wurtz (French: [vyʁts]; 26 November 1817 – 10 May 1884) was an Alsatian French chemist. He is best remembered for his decades-long advocacy for the atomic theory and for ideas about the structures of chemical compounds, against the skeptical opinions of chemists such as Marcellin Berthelot and Henri Étienne Sainte-Claire Deville. He is well known by organic chemists for the Wurtz reaction, to form carbon-carbon bonds by reacting alkyl halides with sodium, and for his discoveries of ethylamine, ethylene glycol, and the aldol reaction. Wurtz was also an influential writer and educator.

== Life ==
Adolphe Wurtz (he never used the name "Charles") was born in Strasbourg, where his father, Johann Jacob (Jean Jacques) Wurtz, was a Lutheran pastor in the nearby town of Wolfisheim. His wife, Adolphe's mother, Sophie Kreiss, died in 1878.

When he left the Protestant gymnasium at Strasbourg in 1834, his father allowed him to study medicine as next best to theology. He devoted himself specially to the chemical side of his profession with such success that in 1839 he was appointed Chef des travaux chimiques at the Strasbourg faculty of medicine. For the summer semester of 1842 he studied under Justus von Liebig at the University of Giessen. After graduating from Strasbourg as M.D. in 1843, with a thesis on albumin and fibrin, he went to Paris, where he first was referred by Jean Baptiste Dumas to Antoine Balard. His employment with Balard lasted a few months, after which Wurtz began work in Dumas's private laboratory. In 1845, he became assistant to Dumas at the École de Médecine, and four years later began to give lectures on organic chemistry in his place.

As there was no laboratory at his disposal at the Ecole de Médecine, he opened a private one in 1850 in the Rue Garanciere; but three years later the building was sold, and the laboratory had to be abandoned. In 1850, he received the professorship of chemistry at the new Institut National Agronomique at Versailles, but the Institut was abolished in 1852. In the following year the chair of "pharmacy and organic chemistry" at the faculty of medicine became vacant by the resignation of Dumas, and the chair of "medical chemistry" by the death of Mathieu Orfila. Both of these chairs were now abolished, and Wurtz was appointed to the newly defined post of "organic and mineral chemistry". (At the same time, a new chair devoted exclusively to pharmacy was awarded to Eugene Soubeiran). In 1866, Wurtz undertook the duties of dean of the faculty of medicine. In this position, he exerted himself to secure the rearrangement and reconstruction of the buildings devoted to scientific instruction, urging that in the provision of properly equipped teaching laboratories France was much behind Germany (see his report Les Hautes Etudes pratiques dans les universités allemandes, 1870).

In 1875, resigning the office of dean but retaining the title of honorary dean, he became the first occupant of a new chair of organic chemistry at the Sorbonne, which the government had established due to his influence. However, he had great difficulty in obtaining an adequate laboratory. The buildings of the new Sorbonne that ultimately provided modern scientific laboratories were not completed until 1894, ten years after his death.

Wurtz was an honorary member of almost every scientific society in Europe. He was the principal founder of the Paris Chemical Society (1858), was its first secretary and thrice served as its president. In 1880, he was vice-president and in 1881 president of the French Academy of Sciences, which he entered in 1867 in succession to Théophile-Jules Pelouze. In 1881, Wurtz was elected life senator. Wurtz's name is one of the 72 names inscribed on the Eiffel tower.

Wurtz died in Paris on 10 May 1884, probably of complications due to diabetes, and was buried in the north-east of the city at Père Lachaise Cemetery.

== Scientific and academic work ==
Influenced by such leading figures as Liebig and Dumas, by 1856 Wurtz became a powerful advocate of a reform in chemical theory then being led by Charles Gerhardt and Alexander Williamson. This new chemistry of the 1850s took the idea of chemical atoms seriously, adopted atomic weights for the elements that strongly resemble the modern ones, and proposed a unitary schematic plan that opposed the dualistic theory derived from the work of Jons Jacob Berzelius. Soon thereafter, Wurtz also adopted the new structural theory that was developing from the work of younger chemists such as August Kekulé. However, a kind of skeptical positivism was influential in France during the second half of the nineteenth century, and Wurtz's efforts to gain a favorable hearing for atomism and structuralism in his homeland were largely frustrated.

Wurtz's first published paper was on hypophosphorous acid (1841), and the continuation of his work on the acids of phosphorus (1845) resulted in the discovery of sulfophosphoric acid and phosphorus oxychloride, as well as of copper hydride. But his original work was mainly in the domain of organic chemistry. Investigation of the cyanic ethers (1848) yielded a class of substances which opened out a new field in organic chemistry, for, by treating those ethers with caustic potash, he obtained methylamine, the simplest organic derivative of ammonia (1849), and later (1851) the compound ureas. In 1855, reviewing the various substances that had been obtained from glycerin, he reached the conclusion that glycerin is a body of alcoholic nature formed on the type of three molecules of water, as common alcohol is on that of one, and was thus led (1856) to the discovery of the glycols or diatomic alcohols, bodies similarly related to the double water type. This discovery he worked out very thoroughly in investigations of ethylene oxide and the polyethylene alcohols. The oxidation of the glycols led him to homologues of lactic acid, and a controversy about the constitution of the latter with Adolph Wilhelm Hermann Kolbe resulted in the discovery of many new facts and in a better understanding of the relations between the oxy- and the amido-acids. In 1855, he published work on what is now known as the Wurtz reaction.

In 1867 Wurtz synthesized neurine by the action of trimethylamine on glycol-chlorhydrin. In 1872 he discovered the aldol reaction and characterized the product as showing the properties of both an alcohol and an aldehyde. Alexander Borodin discovered the reaction independently in the same year. The product was named an aldol, pointing out its double character. This led to a second confrontation with Kolbe.

In addition to this list of some of the new substances he prepared, reference may be made to his work on abnormal vapor densities. While working on the olefins he noticed that a change takes place in the density of the vapor of amylene hydrochloride, hydrobromide, &c, as the temperature is increased, and in the gradual passage from a gas of approximately normal density to one of half-normal density he saw a powerful argument in favor of the view that abnormal vapor densities, such as are exhibited by sal-ammoniac or phosphorus pentachloride. are to be explained by dissociation. From 1865 onwards he treated this question in several papers, and in particular maintained the dissociation of vapor of chloral hydrate, in opposition to Etienne Henri Sainte-Claire Deville and Marcellin Berthelot.

For twenty-one years (1852–1872) Wurtz published in the Annales de chimie et de physique abstracts of chemical work done out of France. The publication of his great Dictionnaire de chimie pure et appliquée, in which he was assisted by many other French chemists, was begun in 1869 and finished in 1878; two supplementary volumes were issued 1880–1886, and in 1892 the publication of a second supplement was begun. Among his books are Chimie médicale (1864), Leçons élémentaires de chimie moderne (1867), Théorie des atomes dans la conception générale du monde (1874), La Théorie atomique (1878), Progrés de l'industrie des matières colorantes artificielles (1876) and Traité de chimie biologique (1880–1885). His Histoire des doctrines chimiques, the introductory discourse to his Dictionnaire (also published separately in 1869), opens with the phrase, La chimie est une science française. Although it raised a storm of protest in Germany, the sentence is less nationalistic than it appears; he intended to refer only to the birth of chemistry under the great Antoine Laurent Lavoisier, rather than asserting exclusive French national ownership of the science.

== See also ==
- Aldol reaction
- Wurtzite

== Works ==
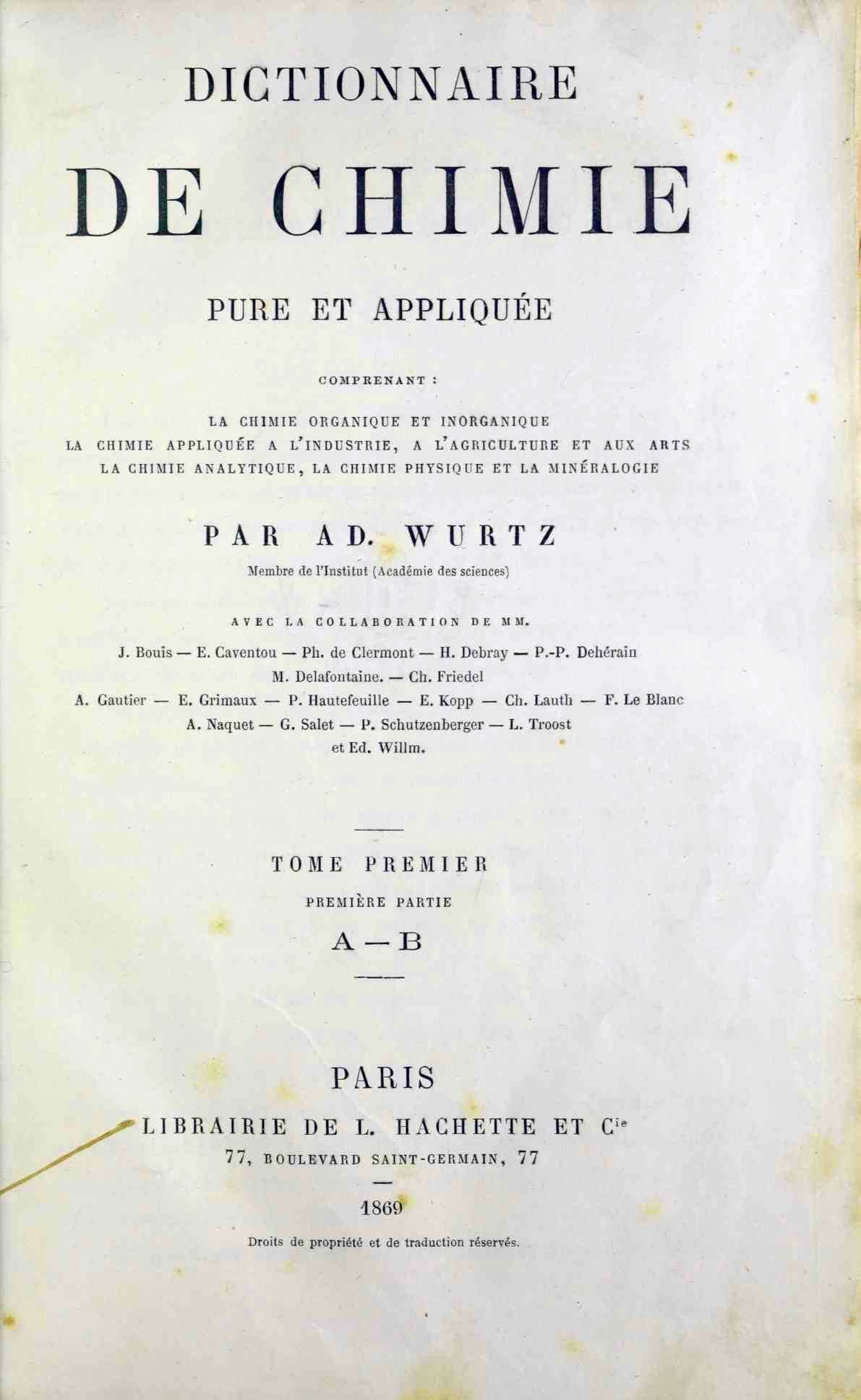
Dictionnaire de chimie pure et appliqueée, 1869

- Historie des doctrines chimiques depuis Lavoisier jusqu'à nos jours (in French). Paris: Hachette et C.ie. 1868.
- Dictionnaire de chimie pure et appliqueée (in French). Vol. A–B. Paris: Hachette et C.ie. 1869.
  - Dictionnaire de chimie pure et appliqueée (in French). Vol. C–G. Paris: Hachette et C.ie. 1870.
  - Dictionnaire de chimie pure et appliqueée (in French). Vol. P–S. Paris: Hachette et C.ie. 1876.
  - Dictionnaire de chimie pure et appliqueée (in French). Vol. S–Z. Paris: Hachette et C.ie. 1878.
