= Dipentaerythritol =

Names
- IUPAC name 2-[[3-hydroxy-2,2-bis(hydroxymethyl)propoxy]methyl]-2-(hydroxymethyl)propane-1,3-diol
- Other names Dipentalide

Identifiers
CAS Number	126-58-9
3D model (JSmol)	Interactive image
ChEMBL	ChEMBL3185131
ChemSpider	29085
ECHA InfoCard	100.004.359
EC Number	204-794-1
PubChem CID	31352
UNII	6699UJQ478
CompTox Dashboard (EPA)	DTXSID3027039
- InChI: InChI=1S/C10H22O7/c11-1-9(2-12,3-13)7-17-8-10(4-14,5-15)6-16/h11-16H,1-8H2 Key: TXBCBTDQIULDIA-UHFFFAOYSA-N
- SMILES: C(C(CO)(CO)COCC(CO)(CO)CO)O

Properties
Chemical formula	C_{10}H_{22}O_{7}
Molar mass	254.279 g·mol^{−1}
Appearance	white solid
Density	1.365 g/cm^{3}
Melting point	222 °C (432 °F; 495 K)
Solubility in water	0.22 g/100 mL
- Except where otherwise noted, data are given for materials in their standard state (at 25 °C [77 °F], 100 kPa). Infobox references

Dipentaerythritol is an organic compound with the formula O[CH_{2}C(CH_{2}OH)_{3}]_{2}. The molecular structure can be described as the ether derivative of pentaerythritol. It is therefore a polyol, which are useful in the production of alkyd resins. The compound is a by product in the production of pentaerythritol but also can be prepared intentionally from the latter:

2 C(CH_{2}OH)_{4} → O[CH_{2}C(CH_{2}OH)_{3}]_{2} + H_{2}O

Several thousand tons are produced annually.

Further condensations are possible, yielding tripentaerythritol, etc.

== Safety ==
The LD_{50} is greater than 2000 mg/kg (rat, oral).

== See also ==
- Trimethylolethane
- Trimethylolpropane
