= C5H13NO2 =

The molecular formula C_{5}H_{13}NO_{2} may refer to:

- Ammonium valerate
- Ammonium pivalate
- Methyldiethanolamine
