= Neopentyl alcohol =

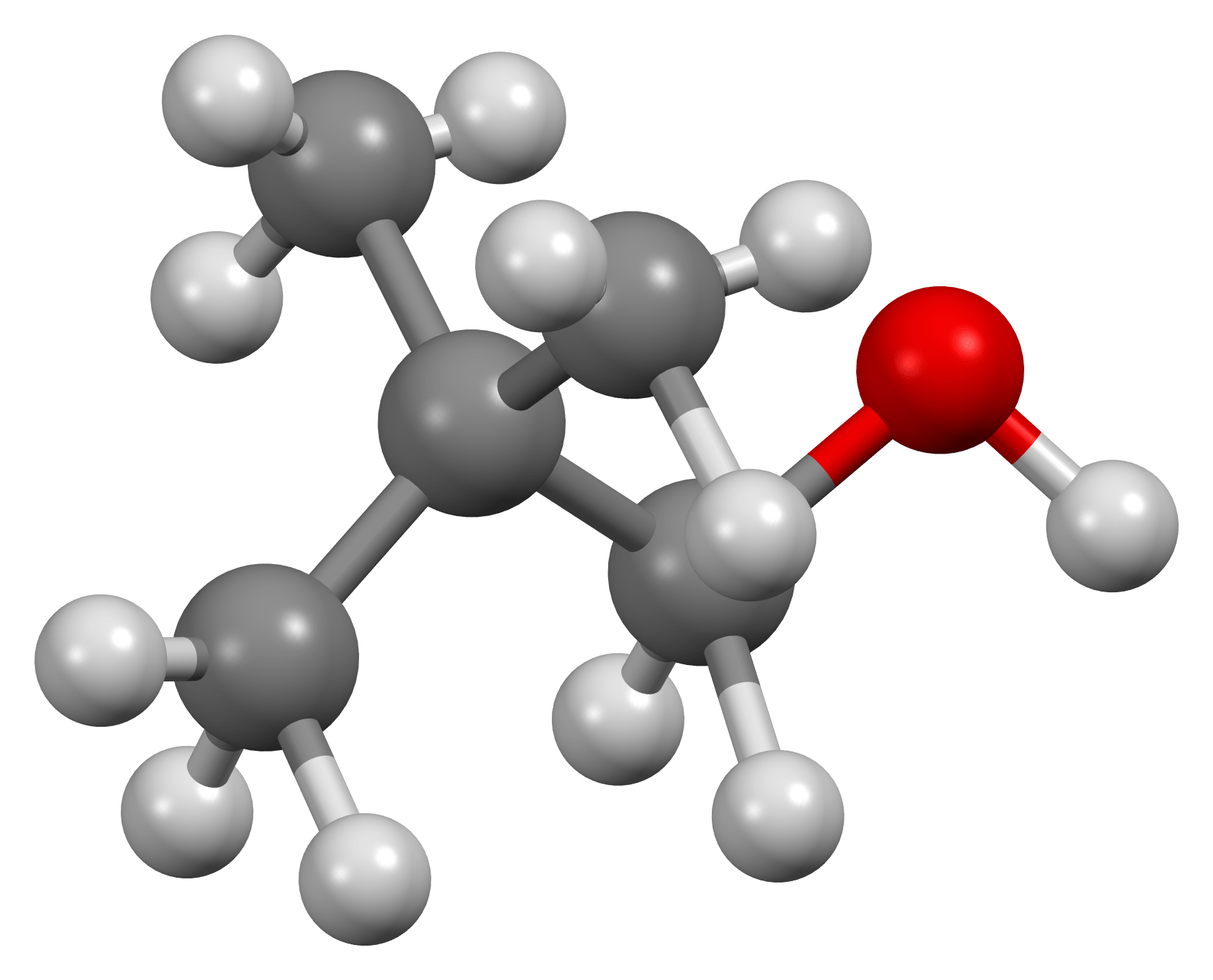
- Ball-and-stick model of the neopentyl alcohol molecule

Names
- Preferred IUPAC name 2,2-Dimethylpropan-1-ol
- Other names tert-Butyl carbinol tert-Butylmethanol; Neoamyl alcohol Neopentanol

Identifiers
CAS Number	75-84-3
3D model (JSmol)	Interactive image
ChEMBL	ChEMBL458630
ChemSpider	6164
ECHA InfoCard	100.000.826
EC Number	200-907-3
PubChem CID	6404
UNII	5I067PJD7S
UN number	1325
CompTox Dashboard (EPA)	DTXSID9052501
- InChI: InChI=1S/C5H12O/c1-5(2,3)4-6/h6H,4H2,1-3H3 Key: KPSSIOMAKSHJJG-UHFFFAOYSA-N; InChI=1/C5H12O/c1-5(2,3)4-6/h6H,4H2,1-3H3 Key: KPSSIOMAKSHJJG-UHFFFAOYAJ
- SMILES: CC(CO)(C)C

Properties
Chemical formula	C_{5}H_{12}O
Molar mass	88.150 g·mol^{−1}
Density	0.812 g/mL at 20 °C
Melting point	52.5 °C (126.5 °F; 325.6 K)
Boiling point	113.5 °C (236.3 °F; 386.6 K)
Solubility in water	36 g/L
Solubility	very soluble in ethanol, diethyl ether

Thermochemistry
Std enthalpy of formation (Δ_{f}H^{⦵}_{298})	−399.4 kJ·mol^{−1}

Hazards
- GHS labelling
Pictograms	(GHS02: Flammable) (GHS07: Exclamation mark)
Signal word	Warning
Hazard statements	H226, H228, H319, H332, H335
Precautionary statements	P210, P233, P240, P241, P242, P243, P261, P264+P265, P271, P280, P303+P361+P353, P304+P340, P305+P351+P338, P317, P319, P337+P317, P370+P378, P403+P233, P403+P235, P405, P501
Flash point	37 °C (99 °F; 310 K)
- Except where otherwise noted, data are given for materials in their standard state (at 25 °C [77 °F], 100 kPa). verify (what is ?) Infobox references

Neopentyl alcohol is a compound with formula (CH_{3})_{3}CCH_{2}OH. It is a colorless solid. The compound is one of the eight isomers of pentyl alcohol.

== Preparation and reactions ==
Neopentyl alcohol can be prepared from the hydroperoxide of diisobutylene. It can also be prepared by the reduction of trimethylacetic acid with lithium aluminium hydride. Neopentyl alcohol was the first described in 1891 by L. Tissier, who prepared it by reduction of a mixture of trimethyl acetic acid and trimethylacetyl chloride with sodium amalgam.

Neopentyl alcohol can be converted to neopentyl iodide by treatment with triphenylphosphite/methyl iodide:

(CH_{3})_{3}CCH_{2}OH + [CH_{3}(C_{6}H_{5}O)_{3}P]^{+}I^{−} → (CH_{3})_{3}CCH_{2}I + [CH_{3}(C_{6}H_{5}O)_{2}PO + C_{6}H_{5}OH

== See also ==
- Pentaerythritol
- Neopentyl glycol
- Trimethylolethane
- Trimethylolpropane
