= Ammonium pivalate =

Names
- IUPAC name azanium 2,2-dimethylpropanoate
- Other names Ammonium trimethylacetate

Identifiers
3D model (JSmol)	Interactive image
ChemSpider	24850209
PubChem CID	12054562
- InChI: InChI=1S/C5H10O2.H3N/c1-5(2,3)4(6)7;/h1-3H3,(H,6,7);1H3 Key: KNWIDSLTUVLFSP-UHFFFAOYSA-N
- SMILES: CC(C)(C)C(=O)[O-].[NH4+]

Properties
Chemical formula	C_{5}H_{13}NO_{2}
Molar mass	119.164 g·mol^{−1}

Related compounds
Related compounds	Methyl pivalate; Pivalamide; Pivaldehyde
- Except where otherwise noted, data are given for materials in their standard state (at 25 °C [77 °F], 100 kPa). Infobox references

Ammonium pivalate is a chemical compound with the chemical formula C_{5}H_{13}NO_{2}.This is an organic ammonium salt of pivalic acid.

== Structure ==
Ammonium pivalate is an ionic chemical compound composed of an ammonium cation NH_{4}^{+} and a pivalate (2,2-dimethylpropanoate) anion C_{5}H_{9}O_{2}^{-}. It acts primarily as a source of mild carboxylate bases in organic synthesis and catalysis.

== Uses ==
The compound is heavily utilized in materials science to synthesize advanced oxide thin films and high-performance superconductors on silicon wafers.

Derivatives such as tetramethylammonium pivalate (TMAP) or tetrabutylammonium pivalate are widely used as metal-free, carboxylate catalysts.
