= Microscale metamaterials =

Microscale structural metamaterials are synthetic structures that are aimed to yield specific desired mechanical advantages. These designs are often inspired by natural cellular materials such as plant and bone tissue which have superior mechanical efficiency due to their low weight to stiffness ratios.

== Synthesis ==
=== Projection microstereolithography ===
This is a layer-by-layer additive printing technology which allows for the creation of arbitrary 3-D structures. Together with nanoscale coating techniques, microstereolithography can create ultralow density, complex microlattices.

The process usually involves a dynamically reconfigurable digital photomask. A 3-D model is decomposed into a series of 2-D planes, the pattern of which is transmitted to the photomask. When shined through by UV light, the mask will transmit the image of the planes onto a lens which subsequently project it onto a photosensitive polymer resin such as 1,6-hexanediol diacrylate (HDDA) causing the liquid to cure in the light exposed areas. These process is repeated for each layer and assembled together to form a 3-D system. Non-polymer lattices can also be created from this process by additional processing. For instance, metallic structures can be created by electroless plating onto the base structure followed by removal of the polymer through thermal heating. Similar deposition techniques can also be used to create ceramic structures.

=== Continuous liquid interface printing (CLIP) ===
This technique is an improvement of the layer-by-layer lithography. Additive manufacturing can be time-consuming and create flawed structures. In conventional 3-D printing, oxygen inhibition often causes incomplete curing and bulky surfaces during photosensitive polymerization. By introducing controlled levels of oxygen, efficient initiation and propagation of continuous polymer chains will result. CLIP proceeds via projecting a continuous sequence of UV images (generated by a digital light-processing imaging unit) through an oxygen-permeable, UV-transparent window below a liquid resin bath. Above a permeable window, there is an oxygen inhibition “dead-zone” maintained by a liquid interface. Above the dead zone, the curing part is continuously drawn out of the resin bath, thereby creating suction forces that constantly renew reactive liquid resin. Unlike convention stereolithography which uses step-by-step processing, CLIP employs a continuous flow.

== Type ==
At low relative density limits, these structures display coupled density to stiffness and strength relationships: $E/E_s\propto(\rho/\rho_s)^n$ and $\sigma_y/\sigma_{ys}\propto(\rho/\rho_s)^n$ where E is the Young’s modulus, y is the yield stress, ρ is the density and subscript s denotes the bulk value of the specified property.

=== Stretch-dominated ===
Stretch dominated structures such as octet tress structure have reduced density to stiffness coupling with n around 1 over many magnitudes of density. This allows for the creation of structural metamaterials which are both ultralight, strong, and energy-absorbing, with elastic behavior up to and 50% compression strain. Often these structures are highly isotropic, with their behavior constant over different loading directions.

=== Bend-dominated ===
Bend dominated structures are usually such as tetrakaidecahedron structure have higher n values that result in non-linear density-to-stiffness ratio, since loading on these crystals are shear rather than tensile as in their stretch-dominated counterpart. However, these structures can also be highly compressive. For instance, 3-D simple cubic bulk graphene aerogels created using layer-by-layer lithography showed lightweight, highly conductive and supercompressible (up to 90% compressive strain) properties.
