= Dibromo neopentyl glycol diglycidyl ether =

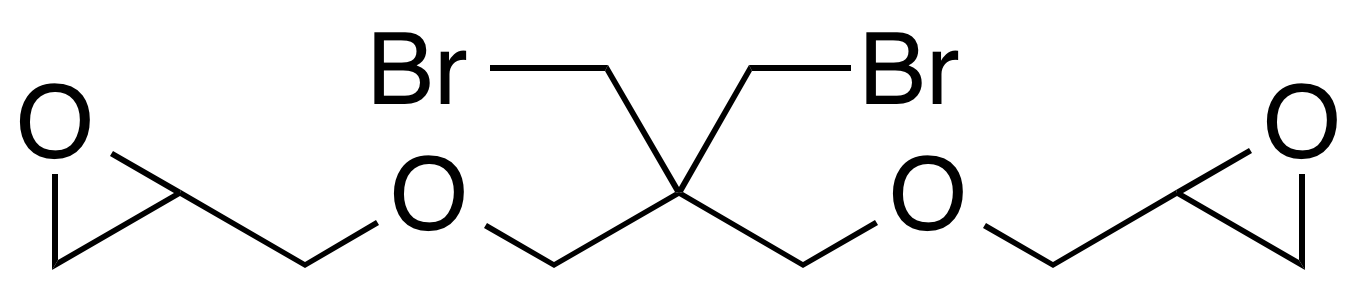

Identifiers
CAS Number	29953-15-9
3D model (JSmol)	Interactive image
ChemSpider	19206410
PubChem CID	20578586
- InChI: InChI=1S/C11H18Br2O4/c12-5-11(6-13,7-14-1-9-3-16-9)8-15-2-10-4-17-10/h9-10H,1-8H2 Key: NLXKDKQYAADKMT-UHFFFAOYSA-N
- SMILES: BrCC(COCC1CO1)(COCC2CO2)CBr

Properties
Chemical formula	C_{11}H_{18}Br_{2}O_{4}
Molar mass	374.069 g·mol^{−1}
- Except where otherwise noted, data are given for materials in their standard state (at 25 °C [77 °F], 100 kPa). Infobox references

Dibromo neopentyl glycol diglycidyl ether is a brominated version of neopentyl glycol diglycidyl ether. It is an aliphatic organic chemical in the glycidyl ether family that is used in epoxy resin formulations. It has the molecular formula C_{11}H_{18}Br_{2}O_{4}

== Synthesis ==
The usual method of synthesis is to take brominated neopentyl glycol and react with epichlorohydrin using Lewis acid catalysis to form the halohydrin. This species is then reacted with sodium hydroxide to form the diglycidyl ether.

== Uses ==
A key use of the material is reducing the viscosity of epoxy resins. As an epoxy modifier it is classed as a reactive diluent, which may then be formulated into CASE applications (coatings, adhesives, sealants, and elastomers and composite materials). As it is an organobromine compound it is used to improve the Flame retardant properties of materials. Flame retardant coatings including powder coatings maybe produced.

== Toxicity ==
There is a trend to try and formulate away from brominated species in general because of the toxicity of the smoke produced when heated.
