= Oil base =

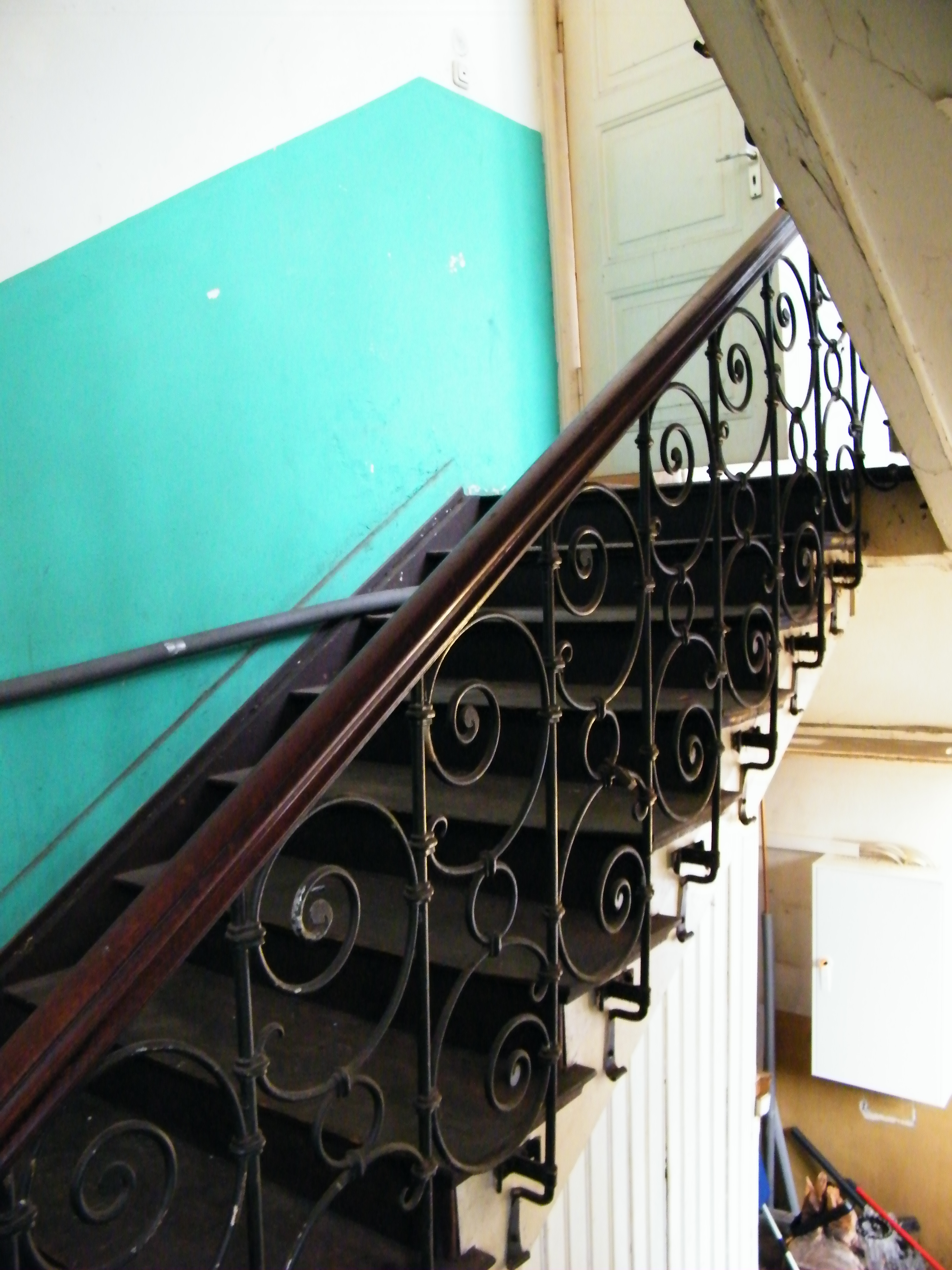
Oil base at the stairscase

An oil base or oil pedestal is a water, dirt, and fat repellent paint which is applied directly as a coating on the rough plaster to protect it. It typically consists of a coating of paint, which is based on alkyd resin. It is often applied to walls alongside staircases, but also in kitchens and bathrooms of old buildings. It is sometimes found in heavy traffic hallways.

== Use ==
The oil base protects the wall from soiling and allows the surface to be easily wiped with a damp cloth for cleaning. The wall is not damaged by wiping, and dirt cannot stick due to the structure of the alkyd-resin-based paint. Even water cannot penetrate into the wall; therefore, the oil base is often found in kitchens or bathrooms of old buildings, where tiles may be used in more modern construction. An oil base may also be found in hospitals and heavy-traffic areas such as hallways or staircases in public buildings.

== Renewal of the oil base ==
For renewal of the oil base, it cannot simply be repainted. The old oil base first has to be completely removed, along with the underlying plaster layer. This can be done by knocking off the top layer of the plaster or by grinding away the existing oil base. Chemical solvents may also be used to peel off the paint layer. Once the old oil base is removed, a new layer of plaster can be applied, and after drying, the new coat of paint can be applied. Renewal of the oil base requires time due to the drying phases.

If the oil base is to be wallpapered with a wallpaper, it has to be thoroughly roughened first.
