= Pivaldehyde =

Names
- Preferred IUPAC name 2,2-Dimethylpropanal
- Other names Trimethylacetaldehyde; Pivalaldehyde; Neopentanal; Neopentaldehyde

Identifiers
CAS Number	630-19-3
3D model (JSmol)	Interactive image
Abbreviations	PivH
ChEBI	CHEBI:141557
ChemSpider	11910
ECHA InfoCard	100.010.123
EC Number	211-134-6
PubChem CID	12417
UNII	SSC20260QW
CompTox Dashboard (EPA)	DTXSID2060888
- InChI: InChI=1S/C5H10O/c1-5(2,3)4-6/h4H,1-3H3 Key: FJJYHTVHBVXEEQ-UHFFFAOYSA-N
- SMILES: CC(C)(C([H])=O)C

Properties
Chemical formula	C_{5}H_{10}O
Molar mass	86.134 g·mol^{−1}
Boiling point	74–76 °C (165–169 °F; 347–349 K)

Hazards
- GHS labelling
Pictograms	(GHS05: Corrosive) (GHS07: Exclamation mark)
Signal word	Danger
Hazard statements	H225, H315, H335
Precautionary statements	P210, P233, P240, P241, P242, P243, P261, P264, P271, P280, P302+P352, P303+P361+P353, P304+P340, P312, P321, P332+P313, P362, P370+P378, P403+P233, P403+P235, P405, P501
- Except where otherwise noted, data are given for materials in their standard state (at 25 °C [77 °F], 100 kPa). (what is ?) Infobox references

Pivaldehyde is an organic compound, more specifically an aldehyde. Shown in the infobox image is a line-angle representation of this organic aldehyde, whose systematic name, 2,2-dimethylpropanal, is based on the longest carbon chain (three carbon atoms), ending in "-al" to indicate the aldehyde functionality, and where another descriptive synonym is trimethylacetaldehyde. Pivaldehyde is an example of an aldehyde attached to a sterically bulky alkyl group, the tertiary butyl group (carbon attached to with 3 methyl groups).

== See also ==
- Pivalic acid - corresponding carboxylic acid
- Neopentanol - corresponding alcohol
- Neopentane - corresponding hydrocarbon
- Pivalamide - corresponding amide
- Pinacolone - corresponding methyl ketone
