= Pentaerythritol =

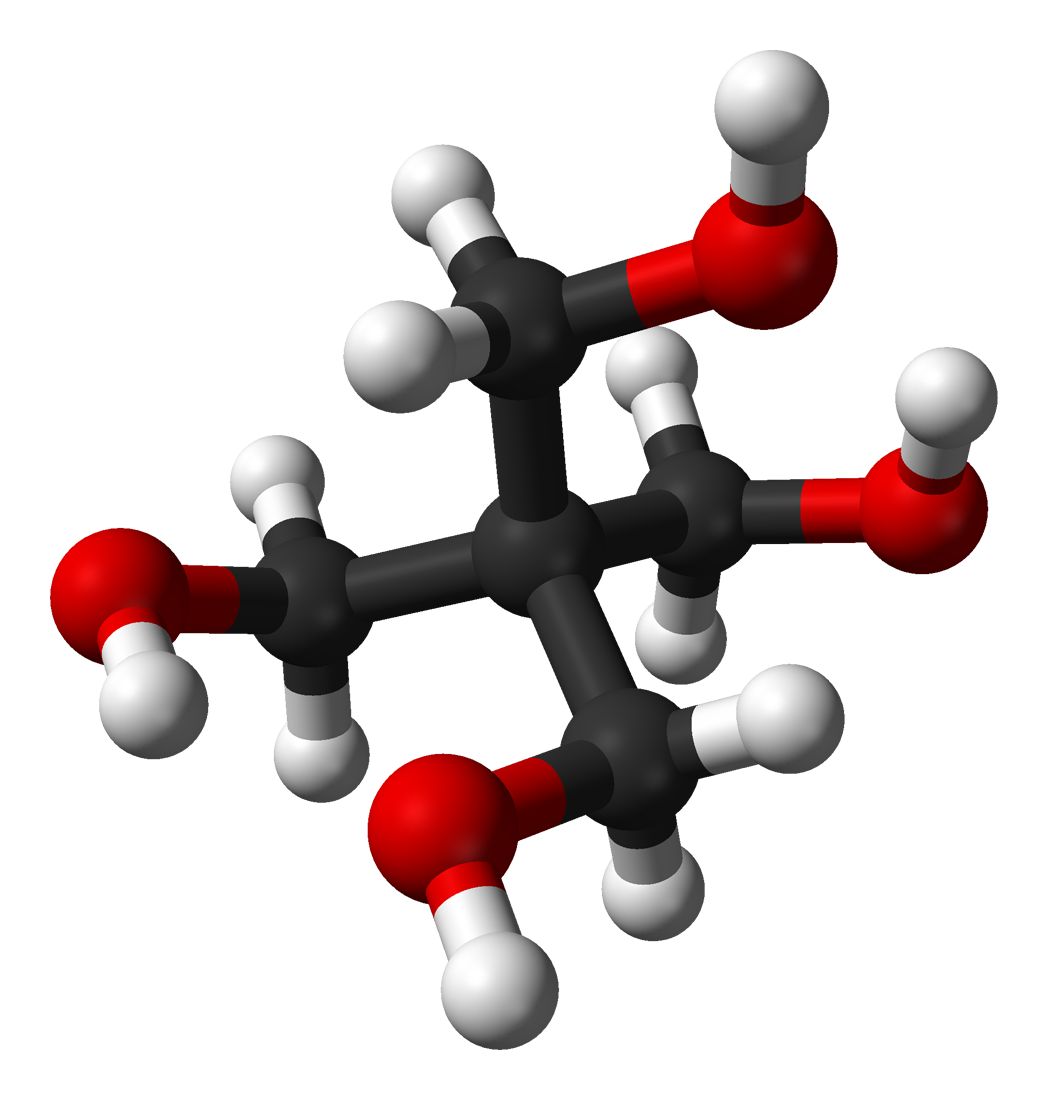

Names
- Preferred IUPAC name 2,2-Bis(hydroxymethyl)propane-1,3-diol
- Other names: 2,2-Bis(hydroxymethyl)-1,3-propanediol; Pentaerythritol; Hercules P 6; Monopentaerythritol; Tetramethylolmethane; THME; PETP; Pentaerythrite; Pentek; Hercules Aqualon improved technical PE-200; neopentanetetraol

Identifiers
CAS Number	115-77-5
3D model (JSmol)	Interactive image
ChEBI	CHEBI:134760
ChEMBL	ChEMBL3186112
ChemSpider	7984
DrugBank	DB13526
ECHA InfoCard	100.003.732
EC Number	204-104-9
KEGG	D08331
PubChem CID	8285
RTECS number	RZ2490000
UNII	SU420W1S6N
CompTox Dashboard (EPA)	DTXSID2026943
- InChI: InChI=1S/C5H12O4/c6-1-5(2-7,3-8)4-9/h6-9H,1-4H2 Key: WXZMFSXDPGVJKK-UHFFFAOYSA-N; InChI=1/C5H12O4/c6-1-5(2-7,3-8)4-9/h6-9H,1-4H2 Key: WXZMFSXDPGVJKK-UHFFFAOYAH
- SMILES: OCC(CO)(CO)CO

Properties
Chemical formula	C(CH_{2}OH)_{4}
Molar mass	136.147 g·mol^{−1}
Appearance	white crystalline solid
Odor	Odorless
Density	1.396 g/cm^{3}
Melting point	260.5 °C (500.9 °F; 533.6 K)
Boiling point	276 °C (529 °F; 549 K) at 30 mmHg
Solubility in water	38.46 g/L (0°C); 47.62 g/L (10°C); 52.60 g/L (15°C); 56.60 g/L (20°C); 74.07 g/L (30°C); 115.0 g/L (40°C); 180.3 g/L (60°C); 285.7 g/L (80°C); 500.0 g/L (100°C)
Solubility	TBuOH, 15g/L (60°C); DMSO, 20g/L (25°C); Slightly soluble in: methanol, ethanol, glycerol, ethylene glycol, formamide. Insoluble in: acetone, toluene, heptane, diethyl ether, dichloromethane.
Vapor pressure	0.00000008 mmHg (20°C)

Hazards
Flash point	200.1 °C (392.2 °F; 473.2 K)
- NIOSH (US health exposure limits)
PEL (Permissible)	TWA 15 mg/m^{3} (total) TWA 5 mg/m^{3} (resp)
REL (Recommended)	TWA 10 mg/m^{3} (total) TWA 5 mg/m^{3} (resp)
IDLH (Immediate danger)	N.D.

Related compounds
Related compounds	Neopentane; Neopentyl alcohol; Neopentyl glycol; Trimethylolethane; Orthocarbonic acid
- Except where otherwise noted, data are given for materials in their standard state (at 25 °C [77 °F], 100 kPa). verify (what is ?) Infobox references

Pentaerythritol is an organic compound with the formula C(CH_{2}OH)_{4}. The molecular structure can be described as a neopentane with one hydrogen atom in each methyl group replaced by a hydroxyl (–OH) group. It is therefore a polyol, specifically a tetrol (neopentanetetraol).

Pentaerythritol is a white solid. It is a building block for the synthesis and production of explosives, plastics, paints, appliances, cosmetics, and many other commercial products.

The word pentaerythritol is a blend of penta- in reference to its five carbon atoms and erythritol, which also possesses 4 alcohol groups.

== Synthesis ==
Pentaerythritol was first reported in 1891 by German chemist Bernhard Tollens and his student P. Wigand. It may be prepared via a base-catalyzed multiple-addition reaction between acetaldehyde and 3 equivalents of formaldehyde to give pentaerythrose (CAS: 3818-32-4), followed by a Cannizzaro reaction with a fourth equivalent of formaldehyde to give the final product plus formate ion.

== Uses ==
Pentaerythritol is a versatile building block for the preparation of many compounds, particularly polyfunctionalized derivatives. applications include alkyd resins, varnishes, polyvinyl chloride stabilizers, tall oil esters, antioxidants (e.g. Anox 20). Such derivatives are found in plastics, paints, cosmetics, and many other products. Relevant to resins, pentaerythritol is a precursor to other polyol, such as dipentaerythritol:

2 C(CH_{2}OH)_{4} → O[CH_{2}C(CH_{2}OH)_{3}]_{2} + H_{2}O

Esters of pentaerythitol are biodegradable, and they are used as transformer oils. Due to a very high flash point they also find some use in lubricating gas turbines.

=== Ester derivatives ===
Pentaerythritol is a precursor to esters of the type C(CH_{2}OX)_{4}. Such derivatives are pentaerythritol tetranitrate (PETN), a vasodilator and explosive, the trinitrate derivative pentrinitrol (Petrin), the tetraacetate normosterol (PAG), and the polymer cross-linking agents pentaerythritol tetraacrylate and pentaerythritol tetrakis(3-mercaptopropionate).

A linear polymer which can be described as a (spiro) orthocarbonate ester of pentaerythritol, whose formula could be written as [(−CH_{2})_{2}C(CH_{2}−)_{2} (−O)_{2}C(O−)_{2}]_{n}, was synthesized in 2002.

=== Fire retardants ===
Pentaerythritol is used as a fire retardant, such as in plastics and intumescent paints and coatings. It releases water upon heating and leaves a deposit of thermally insulating char.

== See also ==
- 1,6-Hexanediol
- Neopentyl glycol
- Trimethylolethane
- Trimethylolpropane
