= Para-tert-Butylbenzoic acid =

para-tert-Butylbenzoic acid
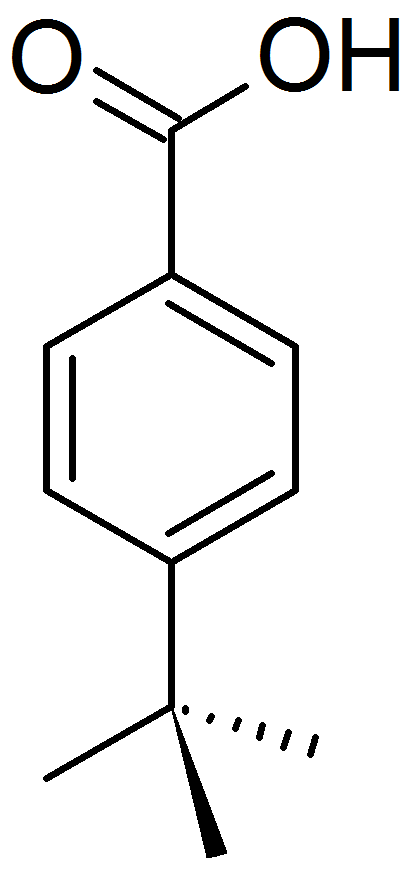

Names
- Preferred IUPAC name 4-tert-Butylbenzoic acid

Identifiers
CAS Number	98-73-7
3D model (JSmol)	Interactive image
ChemSpider	7125
ECHA InfoCard	100.002.452
PubChem CID	7403
UNII	43Z7T3VN0R
CompTox Dashboard (EPA)	DTXSID0040703
- InChI: InChI=1S/C11H14O2/c1-11(2,3)9-6-4-8(5-7-9)10(12)13/h4-7H,1-3H3,(H,12,13) Key: KDVYCTOWXSLNNI-UHFFFAOYSA-N; InChI=1/C11H14O2/c1-11(2,3)9-6-4-8(5-7-9)10(12)13/h4-7H,1-3H3,(H,12,13) Key: KDVYCTOWXSLNNI-UHFFFAOYAA
- SMILES: O=C(O)c1ccc(cc1)C(C)(C)C

Properties
Chemical formula	C_{11}H_{14}O_{2}
Molar mass	178.231 g·mol^{−1}
Melting point	168.5 to 169.0 °C (335.3 to 336.2 °F; 441.6 to 442.1 K)
- Except where otherwise noted, data are given for materials in their standard state (at 25 °C [77 °F], 100 kPa). Infobox references

para-tert-Butylbenzoic acid (PTBBA) is an organic compound. A substituted benzoic acid, it is used in alkyd resins.

This compound is produced by oxidizing para-tert-butyltoluene with air.
