= Trimethylolpropane triacrylate =

Chemical compound

Names
- Preferred IUPAC name 2-Ethyl-2-{[(prop-2-enoyl)oxy]methyl}propane-1,3-diyl di(prop-2-enoate)

Identifiers
CAS Number	15625-89-5
3D model (JSmol)	Interactive image
ChemSpider	25519
ECHA InfoCard	100.036.077
PubChem CID	27423
UNII	4B67KGL96S
CompTox Dashboard (EPA)	DTXSID0027773
- InChI: InChI=1S/C15H20O6/c1-5-12(16)19-9-15(8-4,10-20-13(17)6-2)11-21-14(18)7-3/h5-7H,1-3,8-11H2,4H3 Key: DAKWPKUUDNSNPN-UHFFFAOYSA-N; InChI=1/C15H20O6/c1-5-12(16)19-9-15(8-4,10-20-13(17)6-2)11-21-14(18)7-3/h5-7H,1-3,8-11H2,4H3 Key: DAKWPKUUDNSNPN-UHFFFAOYAU
- SMILES: CCC(COC(=O)C=C)(COC(=O)C=C)COC(=O)C=C

Properties
Chemical formula	C_{15}H_{20}O_{6}
Molar mass	296.319 g·mol^{−1}
Appearance	Liquid
Density	1.109 (20°C)
Melting point	-20°C
Boiling point	390°C
Solubility in water	500 mg/L (20°C)

Hazards
- GHS labelling
Pictograms	(GHS08: Health hazard) (GHS07: Exclamation mark) (GHS09: Environmental hazard)
Hazard statements	H315, H317, H319, H351, H410
Flash point	194.5°C
Autoignition temperature	385°C
- Except where otherwise noted, data are given for materials in their standard state (at 25 °C [77 °F], 100 kPa). Infobox references

Trimethylolpropane triacrylate (TMPTA) is a trifunctional acrylate ester monomer derived from trimethylolpropane, used in the manufacture of plastics, adhesives, acrylic glue, anaerobic sealants, and ink. It is useful for its low volatility and fast cure response. It has the properties of weather, chemical and water resistance, as well as good abrasion resistance. End products include alkyd coatings, compact discs, hardwood floors, concrete and cementitious applications, Dental composites, photolithography, letterpress, screen printing, elastomers, automobile headlamps, acrylics and plastic components for the medical industry.

== Other uses ==
As the molecule has acrylic functionality, it is capable of doing the Michael reaction with an amine. This allows its use in epoxy chemistry where its use speeds up the cure time considerably

TMPTA can be used as a vulcanization booster for specialty rubbers such as ethylene propylene rubber, EPDM rubber, silicone rubber, polyurethane, ethylene/vinyl acetate (EVA) copolymer and chlorinated polyethylene elastomer (CPE). Typically, the vulcanization process is catalyzed with organic peroxides (such as DCP or BPO) however some rubbers are difficult to fully vulcanize using only peroxide catalysts. This usually results in longer curing times and lower yields, compromising mechanical and physical properties. Adding TMPTA has greatly improved the kinetics of vulcanization: for example, when using DCP for curing, if 1 to 4% TMPTA additive is used as a curing agent, not only the curing time is greatly reduced, but the overall chemical and mechanical properties are improved.

== Safety ==
TMPTA's classification got worse over time; in November 2023 all mixtures containing ≥ 1% by weight of TMPTA had been classified as carcinogen category 2 (H351). To overcome this problem, ethoxylated versions (EOTMPTA) were launched on the market, registered on ECHA with a range going from 1 to 6.5 moles of ethoxylation.

== See also ==
- Pentaerythritol tetraacrylate
- 1,6-Hexanediol diacrylate
