= Hydroxypivaldehyde =

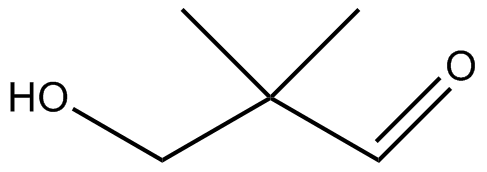

Identifiers
CAS Number	597-31-9
3D model (JSmol)	Interactive image
ChemSpider	11207
ECHA InfoCard	100.008.998
EC Number	209-895-4
PubChem CID	11699
UNII	6DK0IR9LLR
CompTox Dashboard (EPA)	DTXSID9027231
- InChI: InChI=1S/C5H10O2/c1-5(2,3-6)4-7/h3,7H,4H2,1-2H3 Key: JJMOMMLADQPZNY-UHFFFAOYSA-N
- SMILES: CC(C)(CO)C=O

Properties
Chemical formula	C_{5}H_{10}O_{2}
Molar mass	102.133 g·mol^{−1}
Appearance	colorless liquid
Boiling point	141 °C (286 °F; 414 K)

Hazards
- GHS labelling
Pictograms	(GHS07: Exclamation mark)
Signal word	Warning
Hazard statements	H319
Precautionary statements	P264, P280, P305+P351+P338, P337+P313
- Except where otherwise noted, data are given for materials in their standard state (at 25 °C [77 °F], 100 kPa). Infobox references

Hydroxypivaldehyde is the organic compound with the formula HOCH_{2}(CH_{3})_{2}CCHO. A colorless liquid, it is produced by condensation of formaldehyde and isobutyraldehyde:

CH_{2}O + (CH_{3})_{2}CHCHO → HOCH_{2}(CH_{3})_{2}CCHO

The compound is a rare example of a distillable aldol (3-hydroxyaldehyde). Upon standing, it dimerizes reversibly to the dioxane derivative.

== Applications ==
Hydroxypivaldehyde is a precursor to vitamin B5 as is practiced commercially.

Hydroxypivaldehyde is also a precursor to neopentyl glycol by hydrogenation:

HOCH_{2}(CH_{3})_{2}CCHO + H_{2} → (CH_{3})_{2}C(CH_{2}OH)_{2}
