= Trimethylolpropane ethoxylate =

Names
- IUPAC name Poly(oxy-1,2-ethanediyl), α-hydro-ω-hydroxy-, ether with 2-ethyl-2-(hydroxymethyl)-1,3-propanediol (3:1)

Identifiers
CAS Number	50586-59-9
PubChem CID	169100

Properties
Chemical formula	(C_{2}H_{4}O)_{n}(C_{2}H_{4}O)_{n}(C_{2}H_{4}O)_{n}C_{6}H_{14}O_{3}
Appearance	Colorless liquid
Density	1.114 g/mL
- Except where otherwise noted, data are given for materials in their standard state (at 25 °C [77 °F], 100 kPa). Infobox references

Trimethylolpropane ethoxylate (TPEG) is a trifunctional polyether compound derived from trimethylolpropane.

== Production ==
TPEG is produced by ethoxylation of trimethylolpropane.

== Applications ==
TPEG is used in the production of polyurethane foams, elastomers, and sealants.
