= Pivalic acid =

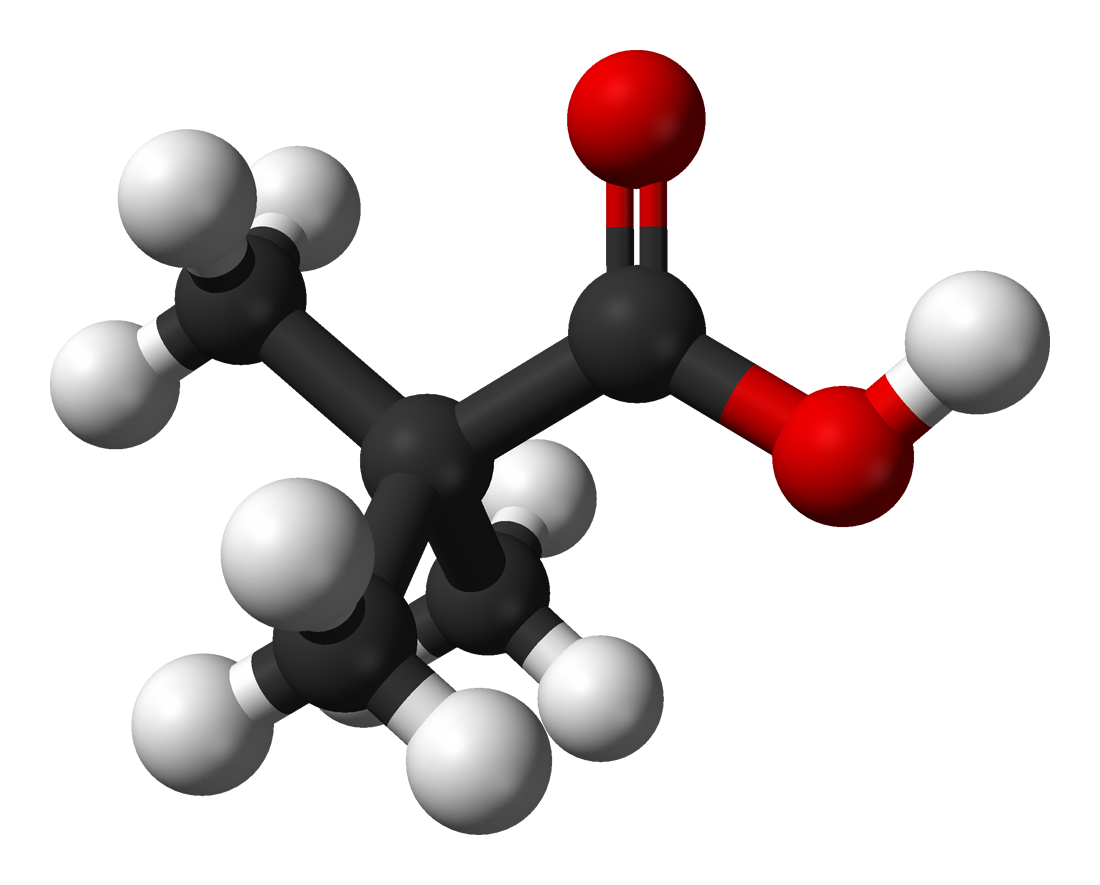

Names
- Preferred IUPAC name 2,2-Dimethylpropanoic acid
- Other names Pivalic acid Dimethylpropanoic acid Neopentanoic acid Neovaleric acid Trimethylacetic acid

Identifiers
CAS Number	75-98-9
3D model (JSmol)	Interactive image
Abbreviations	PivOH
ChEBI	CHEBI:45133
ChEMBL	ChEMBL322719
ChemSpider	6177
ECHA InfoCard	100.000.839
PubChem CID	6417
UNII	813RE8BX41
CompTox Dashboard (EPA)	DTXSID8026432
- InChI: InChI=1S/C5H10O2/c1-5(2,3)4(6)7/h1-3H3,(H,6,7) Key: IUGYQRQAERSCNH-UHFFFAOYSA-N
- SMILES: O=C(O)C(C)(C)C

Properties
Chemical formula	C_{5}H_{10}O_{2}
Molar mass	102.133 g·mol^{−1}
Appearance	colourless solid
Density	0.905 g/cm^{3}
Melting point	35 °C (95 °F; 308 K)
Boiling point	163.7 °C (326.7 °F; 436.8 K)
Solubility in water	2.5 g/100 mL at 20°C
log P	1.48
Vapor pressure	7.3 hPa at 50°C
Acidity (pK_{a})	5.03
Refractive index (n_{D})	1.393 (at 36.5°C)
Viscosity	4.2 mPa·s

Hazards
- GHS labelling
Pictograms	(GHS05: Corrosive) (GHS07: Exclamation mark)
Signal word	Danger
Hazard statements	H302, H312, H314, H315, H319, H332
Precautionary statements	P260, P264, P264+P265, P270, P271, P280, P301+P317, P301+P330+P331, P302+P352, P302+P361+P354, P304+P340, P305+P351+P338, P305+P354+P338, P316, P317, P321, P330, P332+P317, P337+P317, P362+P364, P363, P405, P501
- Lethal dose or concentration (LD, LC)
LD_{50} (median dose)	2000 mg/kg (rat, oral)

Related compounds
Related compounds	Ammonium pivalate; Methyl pivalate; Neopentyl alcohol; Neopentane; Pivalamide; Pivaldehyde
- Except where otherwise noted, data are given for materials in their standard state (at 25 °C [77 °F], 100 kPa). verify (what is ?) Infobox references

Pivalic acid is a carboxylic acid with a molecular formula of (CH_{3})_{3}CCO_{2}H. This colourless, odoriferous organic compound is solid at room temperature. Two abbreviations for pivalic acid are t-BuC(O)OH and PivOH. The pivalyl or pivaloyl group is abbreviated t-BuC(O). Salts of the acid is called pivalates.

Pivalic acid is an isomer of valeric acid, the other two isomers of it are 2-methylbutanoic acid and 3-methylbutanoic acid.

== Preparation ==
Pivalic acid is prepared on a commercial scale by hydrocarboxylation of isobutene via the Koch reaction:

(CH_{3})_{2}C=CH_{2} + CO + H_{2}O → (CH_{3})_{3}CCO_{2}H

Such reactions require an acid catalyst such as hydrogen fluoride. tert-Butyl alcohol and isobutyl alcohol can also be used in place of isobutene. Globally, several million kilograms are produced annually. Pivalic acid is also economically recovered as a byproduct from the production of semisynthetic penicillins like ampicillin and amoxycillin.

It was originally prepared by the oxidation of pinacolone with chromic acid. This necessitates the breaking of a C-C bond, which is usual for this reagent.

Alternative laboratory routes include the Haloform reaction of pinacolone, hydrolysis of corresponding nitrile (Pivalonitrile), and carbonation of the Grignard reagent formed from tert-butyl chloride:

== Applications ==
Relative to esters of most carboxylic acids, esters of pivalic acid are unusually resistant to hydrolysis. Some applications result from this thermal stability. Polymers derived from pivalate esters of vinyl alcohol are highly reflective lacquers.

== Use in the laboratory ==
Pivalic acid is sometimes used as an internal chemical shift standard for NMR spectra of aqueous solutions. While DSS is more commonly used for this purpose, the minor peaks from protons on the three methylene bridges in DSS can be problematic. The ^{1}H NMR spectrum at 25 °C and neutral pH is a singlet at 1.08 ppm.

Pivalic acid is employed as co-catalyst in some palladium-catalyzed C-H functionalization reactions.

=== Alcohol protection ===
The pivaloyl (abbreviated Piv or Pv) group is a protective group for alcohols in organic synthesis. Common protection methods include treatment of the alcohol with pivaloyl chloride (PvCl) in the presence of pyridine.

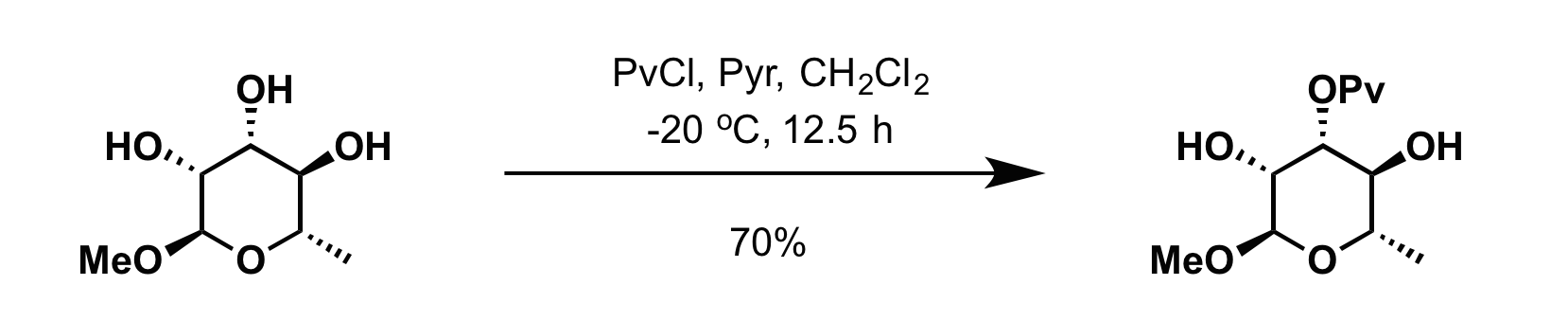

Alternatively, the esters can be prepared using pivaloic anhydride in the presence of Lewis acids such as scandium triflate (Sc(OTf)_{3}).

Common deprotection methods involve hydrolysis with a base or other nucleophiles.

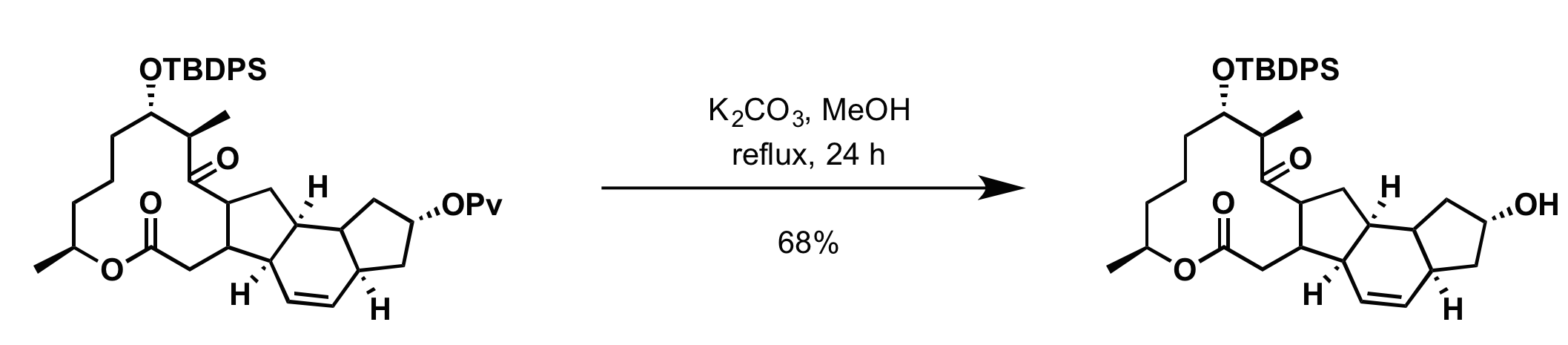
