= Pentaerythritol tetraacrylate =

Names
- Preferred IUPAC name 2,2-Bis{[(prop-2-enoyl)oxy]methyl}propane-1,3-diyl di(prop-2-enoate)

Identifiers
CAS Number	4986-89-4
3D model (JSmol)	Interactive image
ChEMBL	ChEMBL3188166
ChemSpider	56323
ECHA InfoCard	100.023.313
EC Number	225-644-1
PubChem CID	62556
UNII	50LIA3DGN1
CompTox Dashboard (EPA)	DTXSID8042264
- InChI: InChI=1S/C17H20O8/c1-5-13(18)22-9-17(10-23-14(19)6-2,11-24-15(20)7-3)12-25-16(21)8-4/h5-8H,1-4,9-12H2 Key: KNSXNCFKSZZHEA-UHFFFAOYSA-N
- SMILES: C=CC(=O)OCC(COC(=O)C=C)(COC(=O)C=C)COC(=O)C=C

Properties
Chemical formula	C_{17}H_{20}O_{8}
Molar mass	352.339 g·mol^{−1}

Hazards
- GHS labelling
Pictograms	(GHS07: Exclamation mark)
Signal word	Warning
Hazard statements	H315, H317, H319
Precautionary statements	P261, P264, P272, P280, P302+P352, P305+P351+P338, P321, P332+P313, P333+P313, P337+P313, P362, P363, P501
- Except where otherwise noted, data are given for materials in their standard state (at 25 °C [77 °F], 100 kPa). Infobox references

Pentaerythritol tetraacrylate (PETA, sometimes PETTA, PETRA) is an organic compound. It is a tetrafunctional acrylate ester used as a monomer in the manufacture of polymers. As it is a polymerizable acrylate monomer, it is nearly always supplied with an added polymerisation inhibitor, such as MEHQ (monomethyl ether hydroquinone).

== Uses ==
PETA is part of a family of acrylates used in epoxy resin chemistry and ultraviolet cure of coatings. Similar monomers used are 1,6-hexanediol diacrylate and trimethylol propane triacrylate. It is a derivative of pentaerythritol One of the key uses of the material is in polymeric synthesis where it can form micelles and block copolymers. The molecule's acrylate group functionality enables the molecule to do the Michael reaction with amines. It is therefore sometimes used in epoxy chemistry enabling a large reduction in cure time. As the molecule has 4 functional acrylate groups it confers high cross-link density. Ethoxylation maybe used to produce ethoxylated versions which find use in electron beam curing. The material also has pharmaceutical uses

== See also ==
- 1,6-Hexanediol diacrylate
- Trimethylolpropane triacrylate
- Acrylic acid
