= Methyl pivalate =

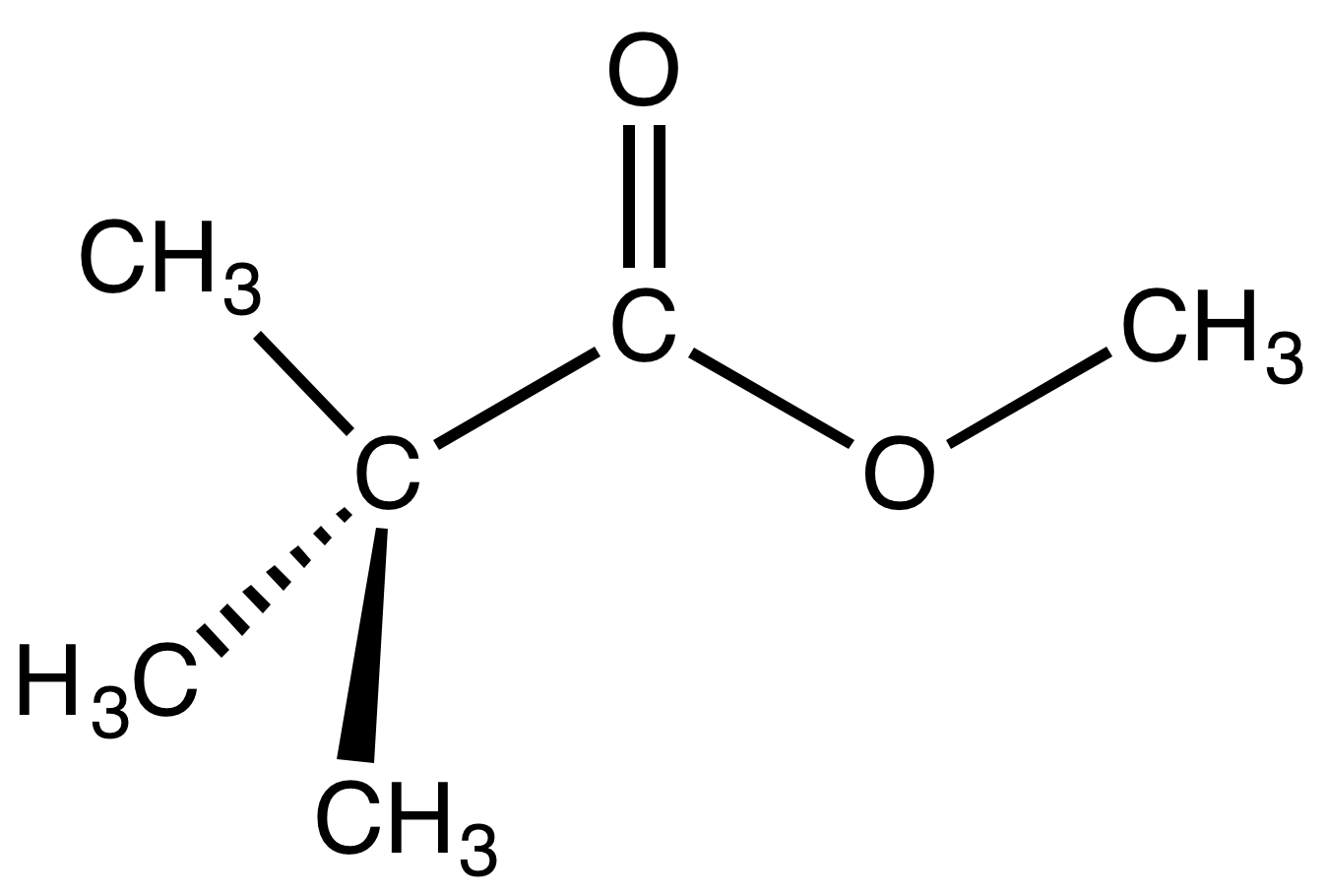

Names
- Preferred IUPAC name Methyl 2,2-dimethylpropanoate
- Other names Methyl trimethylacetate

Identifiers
CAS Number	598-98-1
3D model (JSmol)	Interactive image
ChemSpider	62249
ECHA InfoCard	100.009.055
EC Number	209-959-1
PubChem CID	69027
UNII	BFX9W386OX
CompTox Dashboard (EPA)	DTXSID4027234
- InChI: InChI=1S/C6H12O2/c1-6(2,3)5(7)8-4/h1-4H3 Key: CNMFHDIDIMZHKY-UHFFFAOYSA-N
- SMILES: CC(C)(C)C(=O)OC

Properties
Chemical formula	C_{6}H_{12}O_{2}
Molar mass	116.160 g·mol^{−1}
Appearance	Colorless liquid
Odor	Vinegar-Like
Density	0.873 g/cm^{3}
Boiling point	101 °C (214 °F; 374 K)
- Except where otherwise noted, data are given for materials in their standard state (at 25 °C [77 °F], 100 kPa). Infobox references

Methyl pivalate is an organic compound with the formula CH_{3}O_{2}CC(CH_{3})_{3}. It is a colorless liquid, the methyl ester of pivalic acid. The ester is well known for being resistant to hydrolysis to the parent acid. Hydrolysis can be effected with a solution of trimethylsilyl iodide in hot acetonitrile followed by aqueous workup.
