= Neopentyl glycol diglycidyl ether =

Names
- IUPAC name 2-[[2,2-dimethyl-3-(oxiran-2-ylmethoxy)propoxy]methyl]oxirane
- Other names Neopentyl glycol diglycidyl ether; 1,3-Bis(2,3-epoxypropoxy)-2,2-dimethylpropane; 2,2'-((2,2-Dimethyl-1,3-propanediyl)bis(oxymethylene))bis(oxirane); CCRIS 2640; Diglycidyl ether of neopentyl gylcol; EINECS 241-536-7; Heloxy WC68; UNII-9288EM7AOW; Oxirane, 2,2'-((2,2-dimethyl-1,3-propanediyl)bis(oxymethylene))bis-; Propane, 1,3-bis(2,3-epoxypropoxy)-2,2-dimethyl-

Identifiers
CAS Number	17557-23-2
3D model (JSmol)	Interactive image
ChEMBL	ChEMBL1587512
ChemSpider	26599
ECHA InfoCard	100.037.745
EC Number	241-536-7
PubChem CID	28594
UNII	9288EM7AOW
CompTox Dashboard (EPA)	DTXSID8025707
- InChI: InChI=1S/C11H20O4/c1-11(2,7-12-3-9-5-14-9)8-13-4-10-6-15-10/h9-10H,3-8H2,1-2H3 Key: KUAUJXBLDYVELT-UHFFFAOYSA-N
- SMILES: CC(C)(COCC1CO1)COCC2CO2

Properties
Chemical formula	C_{11}H_{20}O_{4}
Molar mass	216.275 g/mol

Hazards
- GHS labelling
Pictograms	(GHS07: Exclamation mark)
Signal word	Warning
Hazard statements	H315, H317
Precautionary statements	P261, P264, P272, P280, P302+P352, P321, P332+P313, P333+P313, P362, P363, P501
- Except where otherwise noted, data are given for materials in their standard state (at 25 °C [77 °F], 100 kPa). Infobox references

Neopentyl glycol diglycidyl ether (NPGDGE) is an organic chemical in the glycidyl ether family. It is aliphatic and a colorless liquid. It has the formula C_{11}H_{20}O_{4} and the CAS registry number of 17557-23-2. It has two oxirane groups per molecule. Its principle use is in modifying epoxy resins.

It is REACH registered. The IUPAC name is 2-[[2,2-dimethyl-3-(oxiran-2-ylmethoxy)propoxy]methyl]oxirane.

== Synthesis ==
Neopentyl glycol and epichlorohydrin are reacted in the presence of a Lewis acid catalyst to form a halohydrin. This is followed by washing with sodium hydroxide in dehydrochlorination step. This forms Neopentyl glycol diglycidyl ether. The waste products are water and sodium chloride and excess caustic soda. One of the quality control tests would involve measuring the Epoxy value by determination of the epoxy equivalent weight.

== Uses ==
A key use is modifying the viscosity and properties of epoxy resins. As an Epoxy modifier it is classed as an epoxy reactive diluent. which may then be formulated into CASE applications: Coatings, Adhesives, Sealants and Elastomers and composite materials. These uses include cationic polymerization reactions. The use of the diluent does effect mechanical properties and microstructure of epoxy resins. It is also used to synthesize other molecules.

== Toxicity ==
NPGDGE toxicity is fairly well understood. It is classed as a skin irritant and skin sensitizer.

== See also ==
- Epoxide
- Glycidol
