= 1,6-Hexanediol diacrylate =

Names
- Preferred IUPAC name Hexane-1,6-diyl di(prop-2-enoate)
- Other names HDDA, HDODA

Identifiers
CAS Number	13048-33-4
3D model (JSmol)	Interactive image
ChEMBL	ChEMBL1530684
ChemSpider	23890
ECHA InfoCard	100.032.641
EC Number	235-921-9
PubChem CID	25644
UNII	FY751V5MMY
UN number	3082
CompTox Dashboard (EPA)	DTXSID9025401
- InChI: InChI=1S/C12H18O4/c1-3-11(13)15-9-7-5-6-8-10-16-12(14)4-2/h3-4H,1-2,5-10H2 Key: FIHBHSQYSYVZQE-UHFFFAOYSA-N
- SMILES: C=CC(=O)OCCCCCCOC(=O)C=C

Properties
Chemical formula	C_{12}H_{18}O_{4}
Molar mass	226.272 g·mol^{−1}
Appearance	Colorless oil

Hazards
- GHS labelling
Pictograms	(GHS07: Exclamation mark)
Signal word	Warning
Hazard statements	H315, H317, H319
Precautionary statements	P261, P264, P272, P280, P302+P352, P305+P351+P338, P321, P332+P313, P333+P313, P337+P313, P362, P363, P501
- Except where otherwise noted, data are given for materials in their standard state (at 25 °C [77 °F], 100 kPa). Infobox references

1,6-Hexanediol diacrylate (HDDA or HDODA) is a difunctional acrylate ester monomer used in the manufacture of polymers. It is particularly useful for use in ultraviolet light cure applications. Furthermore, it is also used in adhesives, sealants, alkyd coatings, elastomers, photopolymers, and inks for improved adhesion, hardness, abrasion and heat resistance. Like other acrylate monomers it is usually supplied with a radical inhibitor such as hydroquinone added.

== Preparation ==
The material is prepared by acid-catalyzed esterification of 1,6-hexanediol with acrylic acid.

== Other uses ==
As the molecule has acrylic functionality, it is capable of undergoing the Michael reaction with an amine. This allows it use in epoxy chemistry where its use speeds up the cure time considerably.

== See also ==
- TMPTA (trimethylolpropane triacrylate), a triacrylate crosslinker
- Pentaerythritol tetraacrylate, a tetraacrylate crosslinker
