= Neopentyl glycol =

- Neopentyl glycol

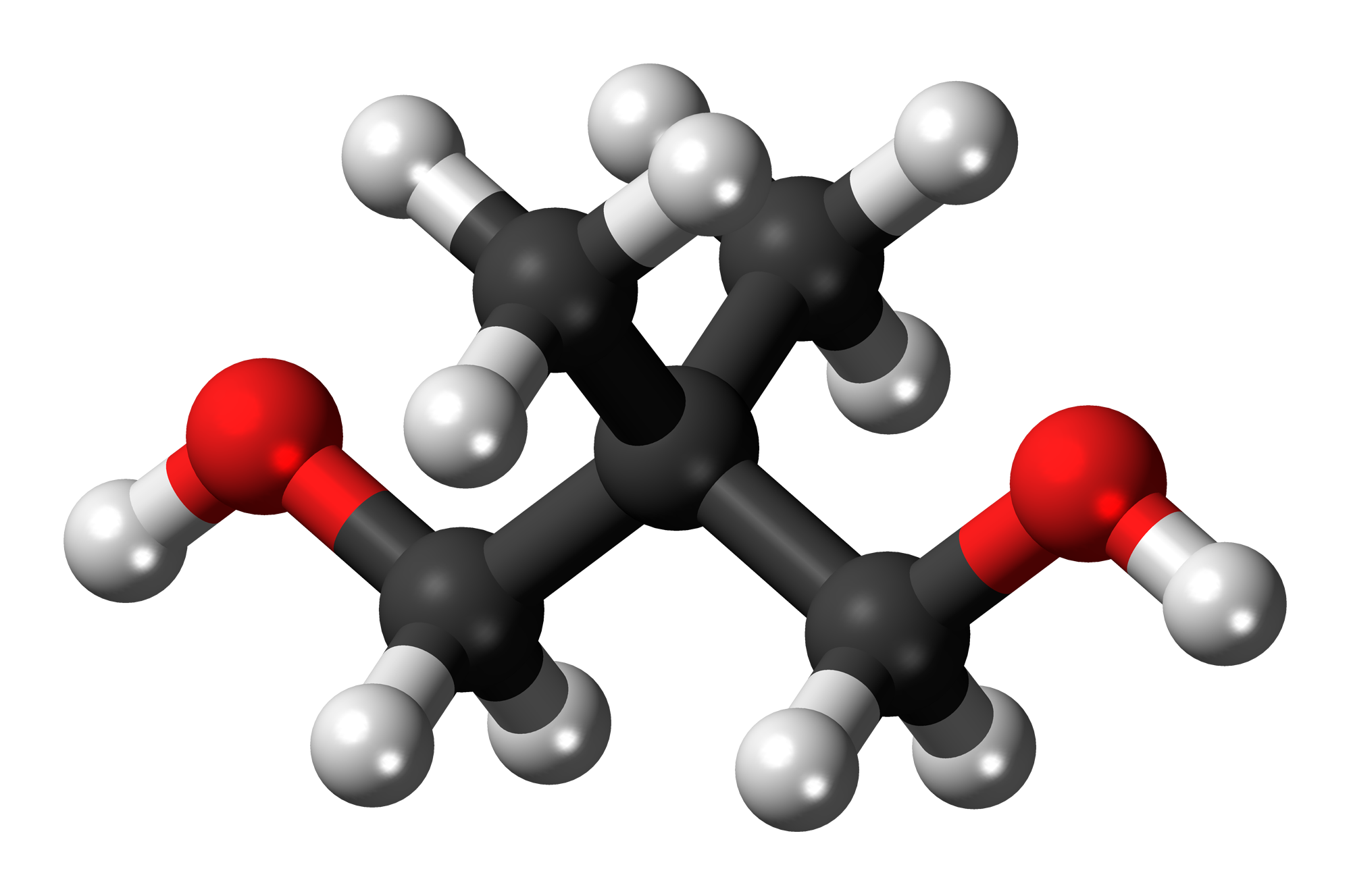

Names
- Preferred IUPAC name 2,2-Dimethylpropane-1,3-diol
- Other names 2,2-Dimethyl-1,3-propanediol

Identifiers
CAS Number	126-30-7
3D model (JSmol)	Interactive image
ChEBI	CHEBI:143768
ChemSpider	13835293
ECHA InfoCard	100.004.347
PubChem CID	31344
UNII	QI80HXD6S5
CompTox Dashboard (EPA)	DTXSID8027036
- InChI: InChI=1S/C5H12O2/c1-5(2,3-6)4-7/h6-7H,3-4H2,1-2H3 Key: SLCVBVWXLSEKPL-UHFFFAOYSA-N; InChI=1/C5H12O2/c1-5(2,3-6)4-7/h6-7H,3-4H2,1-2H3 Key: SLCVBVWXLSEKPL-UHFFFAOYAD
- SMILES: CC(C)(CO)CO

Properties
Chemical formula	C_{5}H_{12}O_{2}
Molar mass	104.148 g/mol
Melting point	129.13 °C (264.43 °F; 402.28 K)
Boiling point	208 °C (406 °F; 481 K)
Solubility in water	83 g/100mL at 20°C
Solubility	soluble in benzene, chloroform, very soluble in ethanol, diethyl ether

Thermochemistry
Std enthalpy of formation (Δ_{f}H^{⦵}_{298})	−551.2 kJ•mol^{−1}

Hazards
Flash point	129 °C (264 °F; 402 K)
- Except where otherwise noted, data are given for materials in their standard state (at 25 °C [77 °F], 100 kPa). verify (what is ?) Infobox references

Neopentyl glycol (NPG) (IUPAC name: 2,2-dimethylpropane-1,3-diol) is an organic chemical compound. It is used in the synthesis of polyesters, paints, lubricants, and plasticizers. When used in the manufacture of polyesters, it enhances the stability of the product towards heat, light, and water. By esterification reaction with fatty or carboxylic acids, synthetic lubricating esters with reduced potential for oxidation or hydrolysis, compared to natural esters, can be produced.

== Reactions ==
Neopentyl glycol is synthesized industrially by the aldol reaction of formaldehyde and isobutyraldehyde. This creates the intermediate hydroxypivaldehyde, which can be converted to neopentyl glycol by either a Cannizzaro reaction with excess formaldehyde, or by hydrogenation using palladium on carbon.

Owing to its tendency to form cyclic derivatives (see Thorpe-Ingold Effect), it is used as a protecting group for ketones, for example in gestodene synthesis. Similarly it gives boronic acid esters, which can be useful in the cross coupling reactions.

A condensation reaction of neopentyl glycol with 2,6-di-tert-butylphenol gives CGP-7930.

Neopentyl glycol is a precursor to Neopentyl glycol diglycidyl ether. The sequence begins with alkylation with epichlorohydrin using a Lewis acid catalyst. Dehydrochlorination of the resulting halohydrin with sodium hydroxide affords the desired ether.

== Research ==
It has been reported that plastic crystals of neopentyl glycol exhibit a colossal barocaloric effect, which is a cooling effect caused by pressure-induced phase transitions. The obtained entropy changes are about 389 joules per kilogram per kelvin near room temperature. This colossal barocaloric effect is likely to be very useful in future solid-state refrigeration technologies.

== Industry ==
The global NPG market valuation is estimated at $1.3 billion USD in 2024, and is forecasted to grow to $1.4 billion USD in 2025, and then to $2.2 billion USD by 2032 at an estimated annual growth rate of 6.7%. The Asia-Pacific region constitutes a 44.16% global market share in NPG as of in 2024.

== See also ==
- Pentaerythritol
- Trimethylolethane
- Trimethylolpropane
