= Ammonium valerate =

Names
- IUPAC name azanium;pentanoate
- Other names Pentanoic acid ammonium salt

Identifiers
CAS Number	42739-38-8
3D model (JSmol)	Interactive image
ChemSpider	142697
ECHA InfoCard	100.050.822
EC Number	227-767-6
PubChem CID	162525
UNII	0U3170A41K
CompTox Dashboard (EPA)	DTXSID00885874
- InChI: InChI=1S/C5H10O2.H3N/c1-2-3-4-5(6)7;/h2-4H2,1H3,(H,6,7);1H3 Key: RXQNHIDQIJXKTK-UHFFFAOYSA-N
- SMILES: CCCCC(=O)O.N

Properties
Chemical formula	C_{5}H_{13}NO_{2}
Molar mass	119.164 g·mol^{−1}
Appearance	white crystals
Melting point	108 °C
Solubility in water	soluble

Hazards
Flash point	107.4 °C
- Except where otherwise noted, data are given for materials in their standard state (at 25 °C [77 °F], 100 kPa). Infobox references

Ammonium valerate is a chemical compound with the chemical formula CH_{3}(CH_{2})_{3}COONH_{4}. This is an organic ammonium salt of valeric acid.

== Synthesis ==
Ammonium valerate can be prepared by reacting valeric acid and ammonium hydroxide.

== Physical properties ==
Ammonium valerate is very readily soluble in water and alcohol, and also soluble in ether.

It has the characteristic odor of valeric acid and a sharp, sweetish taste.

== Uses ==
Ammonium valerate is used as a flavoring agent in the food industry and as a reagent in chemical synthesis.

In the past it was used as a sedative with calming properties against nervous disorders.
