= Poly(ethyl acrylate) =

Identifiers
CAS Number	9003-32-1

Properties
Appearance	colorless solid
Density	1.13 g/cm^{3}
Refractive index (n_{D})	1.464
- Except where otherwise noted, data are given for materials in their standard state (at 25 °C [77 °F], 100 kPa). Infobox references

Poly(ethyl acrylate) (PEA) is a family of organic polymers with the formula (CH_{2}CHCO_{2}CH_{2}CH_{3})_{n}. It is a synthetic acrylate polymer derived from ethyl acrylate monomer. The polymers are colorless. This homopolymer is far less important than copolymers derived from ethyl acrylate and other monomers. It has a low glass-transition temperature between -8 °C and -24 °C.

== Copolymers ==
Far more important than PEA are copolymers produced from ethyl acrylate and one or more of the following comonomers methyl methacrylate, styrene, acrylonitrile, vinyl acetate, vinyl chloride, vinylidene chloride, and butadiene.
