= Poly(methyl acrylate) =

Names
- Other names Polymethylacrylate; Polymethyl acrylate

Identifiers
CAS Number	9003-21-8
Abbreviations	PMA
ChEBI	CHEBI:60755
ChemSpider	none
CompTox Dashboard (EPA)	DTXSID601011066

Properties
Chemical formula	(C_{4}H_{6}O_{2})_{n}
Appearance	colorless solid
Density	1.20 g/cm^{3}
Refractive index (n_{D})	1.479
- Except where otherwise noted, data are given for materials in their standard state (at 25 °C [77 °F], 100 kPa). Infobox references

Poly(methyl acrylate) (PMA) is a family of organic polymers with the formula (CH_{2}CHCO_{2}CH_{3})_{n}. It is a synthetic acrylate polymer derived from methyl acrylate monomer. The polymers are colorless. This homopolymer is far less important than copolymers derived from methyl acrylate and other monomers. PMA is softer than polymethyl methacrylate (PMMA). It is tough, leathery, and flexible.

== Copolymers ==
Far more important than PMA are copolymers produced from methyl acrylate and one or more of the following comonomers methyl methacrylate, styrene, acrylonitrile, vinyl acetate, vinyl chloride, vinylidene chloride, and butadiene.

== Properties ==
It has a low glass-transition temperature about 10 °C (12.5 °C in case of PMA^{38}). It is soluble in dimethyl sulfoxide (DMSO). PMA is water-sensitive and unlike PMMA, is not stable against alkalies.

High-energy radiation leads to cross linking in PMA. However in polymethyl methacrylate (PMMA), a compound similar to PMA, degradation occurs instead.

== Uses ==
Derivatives of PMA are commonly used in orally administered pharmaceutical formulations to target specific regions of the gastrointestinal tract. It is also used in leather finishing and textiles.
