= Trimethylolethane =

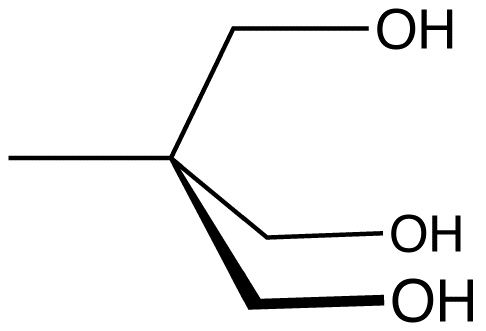

Names
- Preferred IUPAC name 2-(Hydroxymethyl)-2-methylpropane-1,3-diol
- Other names TME; trimet; metriol; methriol; pentaglycerol; pentaglycerine; methyltrimethanolmethane; methyltrimethylolmethane; tris(hydroxymethyl)ethane, 1,1,1-tris(hydroxymethyl)ethane, 1,1,1-trimethanolethane; lidaprim , TME, trimet, metriol,

Identifiers
CAS Number	77-85-0
3D model (JSmol)	Interactive image
ChemSpider	6256
ECHA InfoCard	100.000.968
EC Number	201-063-9
PubChem CID	6502
UNII	5D10NYN23W
CompTox Dashboard (EPA)	DTXSID2026444
- InChI: InChI=1S/C5H12O3/c1-5(2-6,3-7)4-8/h6-8H,2-4H2,1H3 Key: QXJQHYBHAIHNGG-UHFFFAOYSA-N
- SMILES: CC(CO)(CO)CO

Properties
Chemical formula	C_{5}H_{12}O_{3}
Molar mass	120.15 g/mol
Density	1.22 g/mL
Melting point	180 °C (356 °F; 453 K)

Hazards
- GHS labelling
Pictograms	(GHS07: Exclamation mark)
Signal word	Warning
Hazard statements	H315, H319, H335
Precautionary statements	P261, P264, P270, P271, P280, P301+P312, P302+P352, P304+P340, P305+P351+P338, P312, P330, P332+P313, P337+P313, P362, P403+P233, P405, P501
NFPA 704 (fire diamond)	3
Flash point	150 °C (302 °F; 423 K)
- Except where otherwise noted, data are given for materials in their standard state (at 25 °C [77 °F], 100 kPa). verify (what is ?) Infobox references

Trimethylolethane (TME) is the organic compound with the formula CH_{3}C(CH_{2}OH)_{3}. This colorless solid is a triol, as it contains three hydroxy functional groups. More specifically, it features three primary alcohol groups in a compact neopentyl structure. Its esters are known for their resistance to heat, light, hydrolysis, and oxidation. More important than TME and closely related is trimethylolpropane (TMP).

== Production ==
Trimethylolethane is produced via a two step process, starting with the condensation reaction of propionaldehyde with formaldehyde:

CH_{3}CH_{2}CHO + 2 CH_{2}O → CH_{3}C(CH_{2}OH)_{2}CHO

The second step entails a Cannizzaro reaction:

CH_{3}C(CH_{2}OH)_{2}CHO + CH_{2}O + NaOH → CH_{3}C(CH_{2}OH)_{3} + NaO_{2}CH

A few thousand tons are produced annually in this way.

== Applications ==
TME is an intermediate in the production of alkyd and polyester resins, powder coating resins, synthetic lubricants based on polyol esters, stabilizers for plastics, plasticizers, and pigment coatings based on titanium dioxide. Trimethylolethane based resins have superior weatherability and resistance to alkali and heat. Trimethylolethane is used in some phase change materials. The typical composition is then 63 wt.% TME with 37 wt.% water. The mixture has melting point of 29.8 °C and heat of fusion 218 kJ/kg. Nitration of trimethylolethane gives trimethylolethane trinitrate, an explosive, monopropellant, and energetic plasticizer.

== See also ==
- Pentaerythritol
- Neopentyl glycol
- Trimethylolpropane
