= Pivalamide =

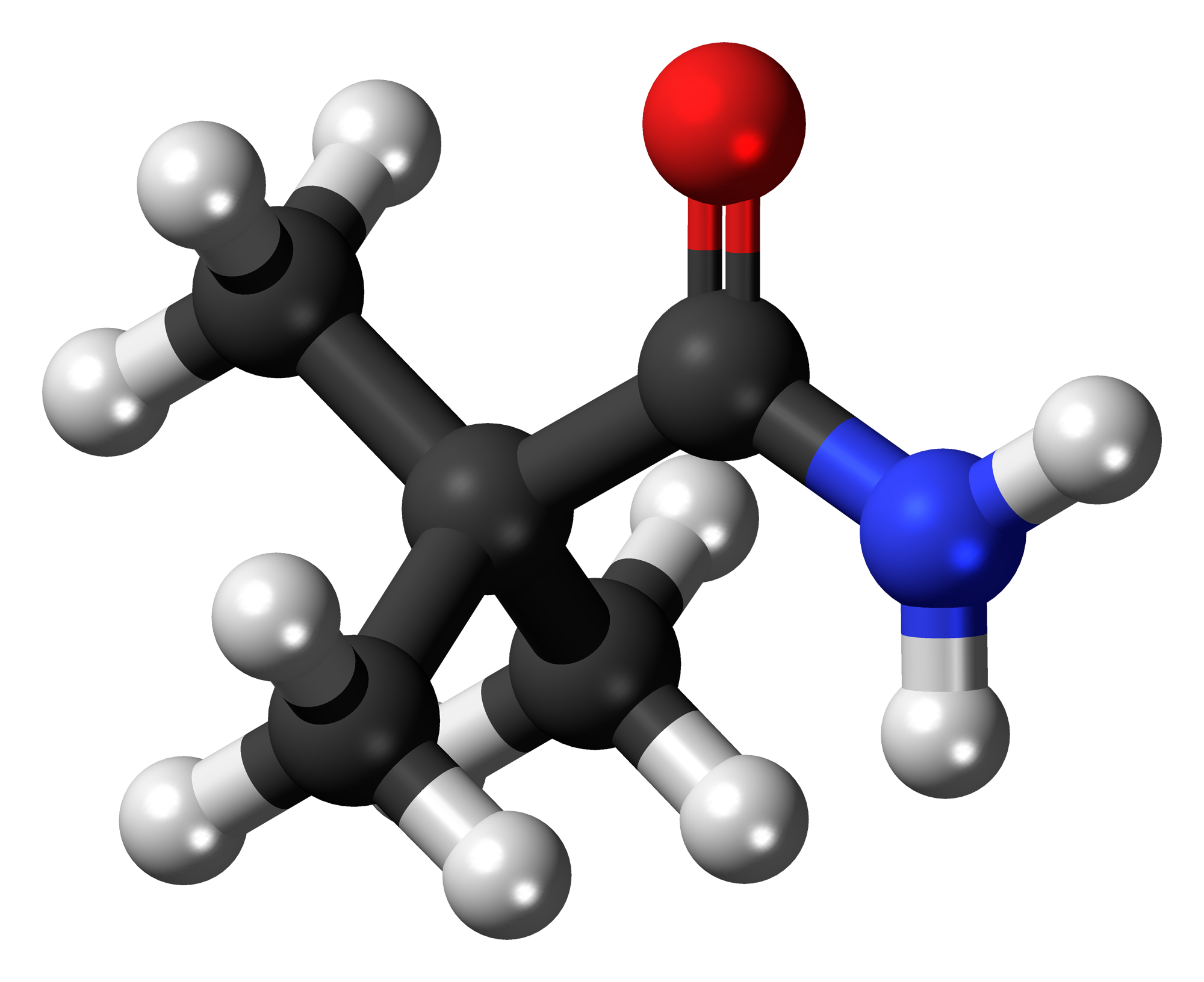

Names
- Preferred IUPAC name 2,2-Dimethylpropanamide
- Other names Trimethylacetamide

Identifiers
CAS Number	754-10-9
3D model (JSmol)	Interactive image
ChEMBL	ChEMBL345235
ChemSpider	12417
ECHA InfoCard	100.010.949
EC Number	212-043-4
PubChem CID	12957
UNII	FES86MR7ZI
CompTox Dashboard (EPA)	DTXSID6061072
- InChI: InChI=1S/C5H11NO/c1-5(2,3)4(6)7/h1-3H3,(H2,6,7) Key: XIPFMBOWZXULIA-UHFFFAOYSA-N; InChI=1/C5H11NO/c1-5(2,3)4(6)7/h1-3H3,(H2,6,7) Key: XIPFMBOWZXULIA-UHFFFAOYAC
- SMILES: O=C(N)C(C)(C)C

Properties
Chemical formula	C_{5}H_{11}NO
Molar mass	101.149 g·mol^{−1}
Melting point	154 to 157 °C (309 to 315 °F; 427 to 430 K)
Boiling point	212 °C (414 °F; 485 K)
- Except where otherwise noted, data are given for materials in their standard state (at 25 °C [77 °F], 100 kPa). verify (what is ?) Infobox references

Pivalamide (2,2-dimethylpropanamide, or NDEPA), a simple amide substituted with a tert-butyl group having the chemical formula: ^{t}Bu-CO-NH_{2}. It is the amide of pivalic acid.

N-Pivalamide, is a functional group having the following chemical formula: tBu-CO-NH-R
