= Trimethylolpropane =

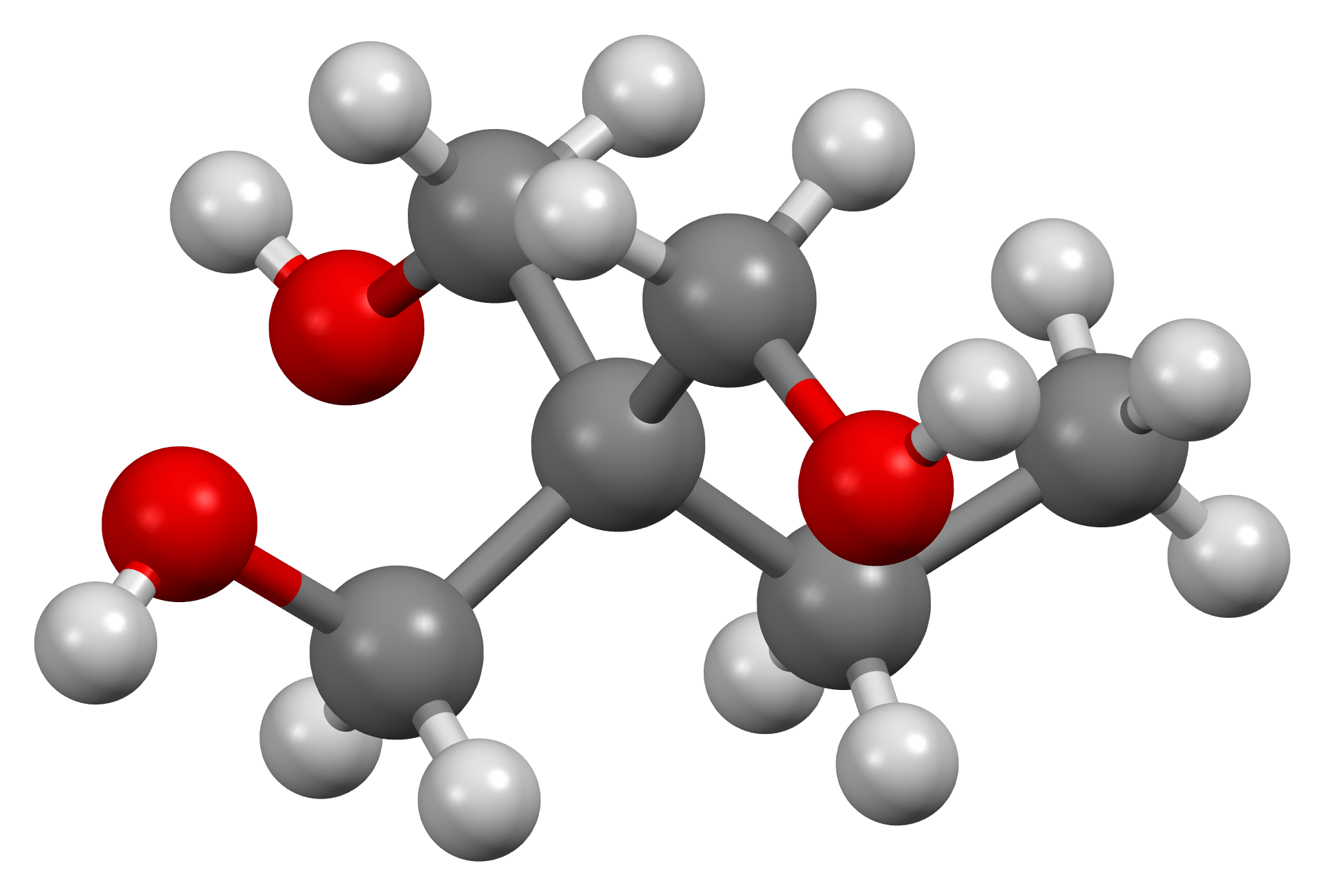

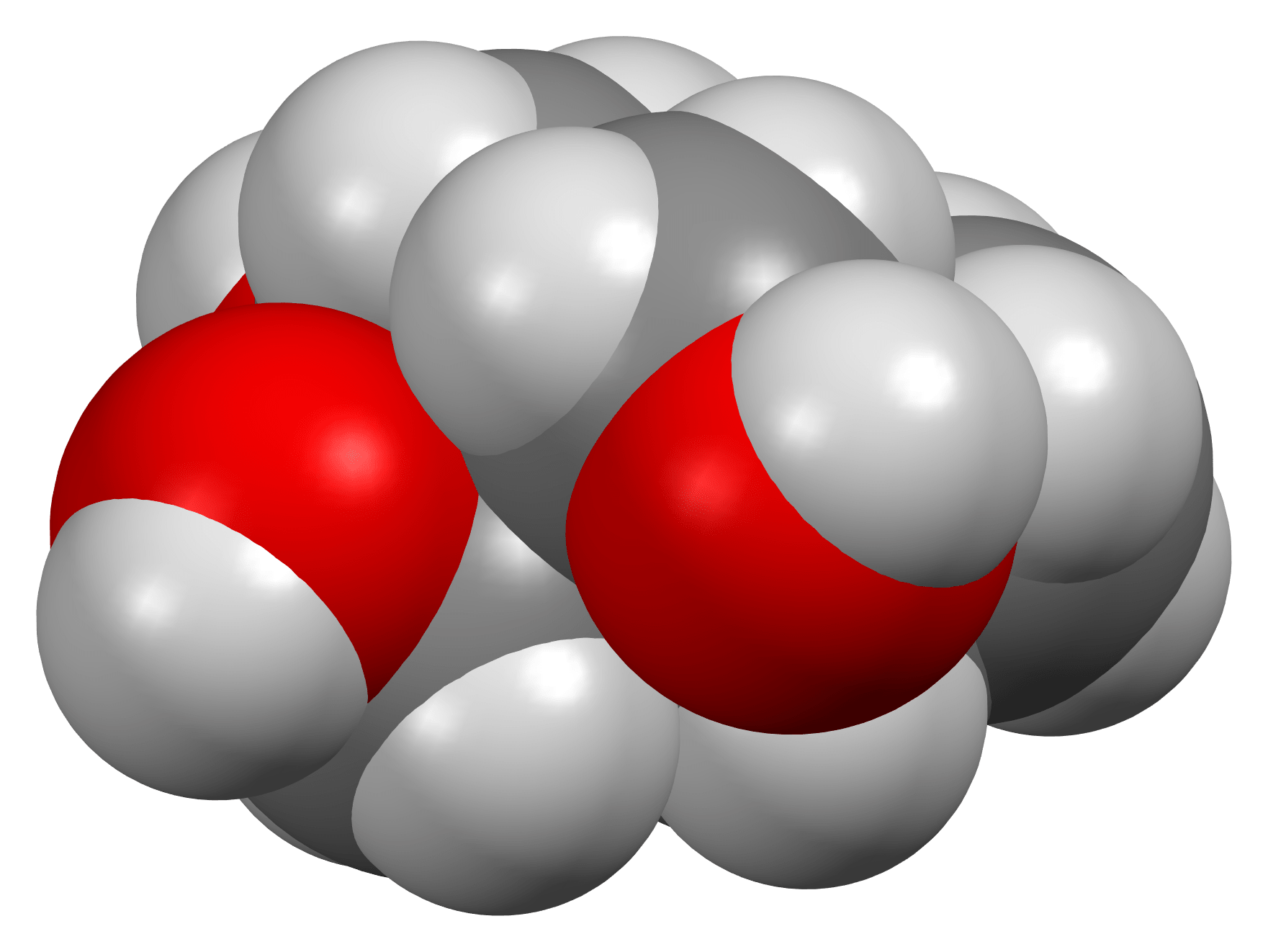

Names
- Preferred IUPAC name 2-Ethyl-2-(hydroxymethyl)propane-1,3-diol
- Other names TMP, 2-ethyl-2-hydroxymethyl-1,3-propanediol

Identifiers
CAS Number	77-99-6
3D model (JSmol)	Interactive image
ChemSpider	6264
ECHA InfoCard	100.000.978
EC Number	201-074-9
MeSH	C018163
PubChem CID	6510
UNII	090GDF4HBD
CompTox Dashboard (EPA)	DTXSID2026448
- InChI: InChI=1S/C6H14O3/c1-2-6(3-7,4-8)5-9/h7-9H,2-5H2,1H3 Key: ZJCCRDAZUWHFQH-UHFFFAOYSA-N
- SMILES: CCC(CO)(CO)CO

Properties
Chemical formula	C_{6}H_{14}O_{3}
Molar mass	134.17 g/mol
Appearance	White solid
Odor	Faint odor
Density	1.084 g/mL
Melting point	58 °C (136 °F; 331 K)
Boiling point	289 °C (552 °F; 562 K)

Hazards
NFPA 704 (fire diamond)	3
Flash point	172 °C (342 °F; 445 K)
- Except where otherwise noted, data are given for materials in their standard state (at 25 °C [77 °F], 100 kPa). verify (what is ?) Infobox references

Trimethylolpropane (TMP) is the organic compound with the formula CH_{3}CH_{2}C(CH_{2}OH)_{3}. This colourless to white solid with a faint odor is a triol. Containing three hydroxy functional groups, TMP is a widely used building block in the polymer industry.

== Production ==
TMP is produced industrially via a two step process, starting with the aldol condensation of butyraldehyde with formaldehyde:

CH_{3}CH_{2}CH_{2}CHO + 2 CH_{2}O → CH_{3}CH_{2}C(CH_{2}OH)_{2}CHO

The second step is a classical Cannizzaro reaction using sodium hydroxide:

CH_{3}CH_{2}C(CH_{2}OH)_{2}CHO + CH_{2}O + NaOH → CH_{3}CH_{2}C(CH_{2}OH)_{3} + NaO_{2}CH

Approximately 200,000,000 kg are produced annually in this way.

== Applications ==
TMP is mainly consumed as a precursor to alkyd resins. Otherwise, acrylated and alkoxylated TMP's are used as multifunctional monomers to produce various coatings, Ethoxylated and propoxylated TMP, derived condensation of from TMP and the epoxides, are used for production of flexible polyurethanes. Allyl ether derivatives of TMP, with the formula CH_{3}CH_{2}C(CH_{2}OCH_{2}CH=CH_{2})_{3-x}(CH_{2}OH)_{x} are precursors to high-gloss coatings and ion exchange resins. The oxetane "TMPO" is a strong photoinitiator. It is may also be reacted with epichlorohydrin to produce the triglycidyl ether.

== See also ==
- Pentaerythritol
- Neopentyl glycol
- Trimethylolethane
