= Alkyd =

Polyester resin modified by the addition of fatty acids and other components

An alkyd is a polyester resin modified by the addition of fatty acids and other components. Alkyds are derived from polyols and organic acids including dicarboxylic acids or carboxylic acid anhydride and triglyceride oils. The term alkyd is a modification of the original name "alcid", reflecting the fact that they are derived from alcohol and organic acids. The inclusion of a fatty acid confers a tendency to form flexible coatings. Alkyds are used in paints, varnishes and in moulds for casting. They are the dominant resin or binder in most commercial oil-based coatings. Approximately 200,000 tons of alkyd resins are produced each year. The original alkyds were compounds of glycerol and phthalic acid sold under the name Glyptal. These were sold as substitutes for the darker-colored copal resins, thus creating alkyd varnishes that were much paler in colour. From these, the alkyds that are known today were developed.

Structure of an idealized alkyd resin derived from glycerol and phthalic anhydride

== Manufacture ==
Alkyd resins may be classified as drying (including semi drying) and nondrying. Both types are typically produced from dicarboxylic acids or anhydrides, such as phthalic anhydride or maleic anhydride, and polyols, such as trimethylolpropane, glycerine, or pentaerythritol. Alkyds are a synthetic resin and used in items such as paints. They are not the same as resin derived from natural sources such as plants.

For the drying resins, triglycerides are derived from polyunsaturated fatty acids (often derived from plant and vegetable oils, e.g. linseed oil). These drying alkyds are cured by the oxygen in air. The drying speed and the nature of the coatings depends on the amount and type of drying oil employed (more polyunsaturated oil means faster reaction in air) and presence of catalysts, the so-called oil drying agents. These catalysts are metal complexes that catalyze crosslinking of the unsaturated sites. Cobalt salts are particularly effective and widely used. Because of the alleged carcinogenicity of cobalt, some researchers are attempting to develop non-cobalt catalysts as replacements in alkyd coatings; none have been found yet that are as effective as cobalt.

Alkyd resins are produced in two processes: the fatty acid process and the alcoholysis or monoglyceride process. Higher-quality, higher-performance alkyds are produced in the fatty acid process, in which the composition of the resulting resin may be more precisely controlled. In this process, an acid anhydride, a polyol and an unsaturated fatty acid are combined and cooked together until the product has achieved a predetermined level of viscosity. Pentaerythritol based alkyds are made this way. More economical alkyd resins are produced from the alcoholysis or glyceride process, in which end-product quality control is not as paramount. In this process, raw vegetable oil, high in unsaturated component, is combined with additional polyol and heated to cause transesterification of the triglycerides into a mixture of mono- and diglyceride oils. Soybean oil is often used. Acid anhydride is added to the resulting mixture to build the molecular weight of the resin into roughly the same product as with the fatty acid process. However, the alcoholysis process produces a more randomly oriented structure. To remove the water produced as a by-product and to increase the reaction rate, surplus phthalic anhydride is added. Water is thus removed with the unreacted acid by heating the bulk to a specific temperature. The reaction is not as controllable as would be desired, so a new process was introduced in which xylene is added to produce an azeotrope with the water. This gives greater control at a lower temperature and also produces resins at a lower viscosity, useful in making high-solids paints. This is known as the AZO process. In both cases, the resulting product is a polyester resin to which pendant drying oil groups are attached. At the conclusion of each process the resin is purified, diluted in solvent and sold to paint and varnish makers.

== Metal casting ==
Alkyd or oil-urethane binders are used in casting for the creation of sand-based moulds. The alkyd resin is mixed with a polymeric isocyanate and a metallic drier, which speeds up the reaction. Unlike other no-bake mould technologies, the process yields no toxic fumes, but the moulds need more air-curing time.

== Coating types ==
Alkyd resins are usually classed as long oil, medium oil and short oil. These terms represent the oil length in the resin. Alkyds are also modified with phenolic resin, styrene, vinyl toluene, acrylic monomers (to make them dry more quickly) and isocyanates to produce a polyurethane modified alkyd. Urethane alkyds are manufactured by reacting the OH groups residual on the alkyd with NCO groups from an isocyanate often TDI. By adding certain modifying resins, it is possible to produce thixotropic alkyds for decorative use such as non-drip paints. The latest alkyds are short oil resins in which the oil length is shortened by use of a polymeric chain stopper usually a monobasic acid such as benzoic acid or para-tert-butylbenzoic acid (Alkydal M 48). These have a better controlled molecular weight distribution and better durability. Alkyds for decorative use have extra oil cooked in to lengthen them and to make them more durable. Short oil resins used in stoving enamels are made from non-drying saturated oils or fatty acids. These usually have much higher hydroxyl and acid values to be able to react with the hydroxyl groups of the amino resins. These mixtures are usually stabilized with amines to prevent gelling on storage.

Because the major components of an alkyd coating, i.e. fatty acids and triglyceride oils, are derived from low cost renewable resources, the cost of alkyd coatings has remained very low despite the ever-increasing cost of petroleum, which is the predominant raw-material source of most other coatings such as vinyls, acrylics, epoxies and polyurethanes. Typical sources of drying oils for alkyd coatings are tung oil, linseed oil, sunflower oil, safflower oil, walnut oil, soybean oil, fish oil, corn oil, dehydrated castor oil (in which dehydration transforms certain of its fatty acids' single bonds into double bonds, some of them conjugated, creating a semi-drying oil) and tall oil (resinous oil by-product from pulp and paper manufacturing). Non-drying/plasticizer resins are made from castor, palm, coconut oils and Cardura (the proprietary name of a synthetic ester of versatic acid). Dehydrated castor oil was at one time the only oil permitted in resin manufacture in India; no edible oils were allowed.

They may be used to formulate flame-retardant coatings.

== Hybrids ==
As with many resin systems and coatings, alkyds may be hybridized with other resin technologies. One example is acrylated alkyds. Although urethane alkyds are in effect a hybrid, novel technologies include manufacturing a moisture-curable polyurethane alkyd. Grafting of silicon based materials onto alkyds has also been researched. As part of an effort to use more recycled materials, alkyds have been produced that are made from scrap PET bottles.

== Waterborne alkyds ==
There has been a general trend worldwide to formulate resins and coatings that are waterborne rather than formulated with solvent as waterbased materials are perceived to be environmentally friendly. Waterborne alkyds have thus been made available too. One method is to acrylic-modify the alkyd to make it water-reducible. Synthesis techniques of acrylic-modified water-reducible alkyds to improve corrosion performance have likewise been studied.
