= Cocamide =

- General chemical structure of cocamide where n = 6, 8, 10, 12, 14, 16

Names
- Other names: Coco amides; Coconut oil amides; Coco fatty acid amides; Coco fatty amides

Identifiers
CAS Number	61789-19-3
EC Number	263-039-4
UNII	3YXD33R71G

Properties
Chemical formula	CH_{3}(CH_{2})_{n}CONH_{2}
- Except where otherwise noted, data are given for materials in their standard state (at 25 °C [77 °F], 100 kPa). Infobox references

Cocamide is a mixture of amides manufactured from the fatty acids obtained from coconut oil. As coconut oil contains about 50% of lauric acid, in formulas only the 12-carbon chains tend to be considered. Therefore the formula of cocamide can be written as CH_{3}(CH_{2})_{10}CONH_{2}, though the number of carbon atoms in the chains varies (it is always even).

Cocamide is the structural basis of many surfactants. Common are ethanolamines (cocamide MEA, cocamide DEA), betaine compounds (cocamidopropyl betaine), and hydroxysultaines (cocamidopropyl hydroxysultaine).
