= Sodium coceth sulfate =

Names
- Systematic IUPAC name Poly(oxy-1,2-ethanediyl), α-sulfo-ω-hydroxy-, C12-14-alkyl ethers, sodium salts

Identifiers
CAS Number	68891-38-3
EC Number	500-234-8
UNII	3599J29ANH

Properties
Chemical formula	C_{x}H_{y}(OCH_{2}CH_{2})_{n}OSO_{3}Na
Molar mass	Variable
- Except where otherwise noted, data are given for materials in their standard state (at 25 °C [77 °F], 100 kPa). Infobox references

Sodium coceth sulfate is a semisynthetic detergent-like compound derived from fatty acids obtained from coconut oil, modified using ethylene oxide (oxirane). It is a milder foaming agent found in baby cleansers, gels, and cleaners.
