= Cocamide MEA =

- Cocoamide MEA

Names
- IUPAC name N-(2-hydroxyethyl)dodecanamide
- Other names Cocamide monoethanolamine; Monoethanolamine coconut acid amide; Coco monoethanolamide; Coconut fatty acid monoethanolamide; Cocoyl monoethanolamine; N-(2-Hydroxyethyl) coco fatty acid amide; Coconut oil fatty acid ethanolamide

Identifiers
CAS Number	68140-00-1
3D model (JSmol)	Interactive image
ChEBI	CHEBI:85263
ChEMBL	ChEMBL246914
ChemSpider	none
ECHA InfoCard	100.062.500
EC Number	268-770-2
PubChem CID	8899
UNII	C80684146D
CompTox Dashboard (EPA)	DTXSID8028391
- InChI: InChI=1S/C14H29NO2/c1-2-3-4-5-6-7-8-9-10-11-14(17)15-12-13-16/h16H,2-13H2,1H3,(H,15,17) Key: QZXSMBBFBXPQHI-UHFFFAOYSA-N
- SMILES: CCCCCCCCCCCC(=O)NCCO

Properties
Chemical formula	CH_{3}(CH_{2})_{n}CONHCH_{2}CH_{2}OH
Density	1.08-1.09 g/cm^{3}
Melting point	60 to 63 °C (140 to 145 °F; 333 to 336 K)
Boiling point	> 200 °C (392 °F; 473 K)

Hazards
- GHS labelling
Pictograms	(GHS05: Corrosive) (GHS07: Exclamation mark) (GHS09: Environmental hazard)
Signal word	Danger
Hazard statements	H315, H318
Precautionary statements	P264, P270, P273, P280, P301+P312, P302+P352, P305+P351+P338, P310, P321, P330, P332+P313, P362, P391, P501
- Lethal dose or concentration (LD, LC)
LD_{50} (median dose)	> 3000 mg/kg (oral, rat)
- Except where otherwise noted, data are given for materials in their standard state (at 25 °C [77 °F], 100 kPa). Infobox references

Cocamide MEA, or cocamide monoethanolamine, is a solid, off-white to tan compound, often sold in flaked form. The solid melts to yield a pale yellow viscous clear liquid. It is a mixture of fatty acid amides which is produced from the fatty acids in coconut oil when reacted with ethanolamine.

== Uses ==
Cocamide MEA and other cocamide ethanolamines such as cocamide DEA are used as foaming agents and nonionic surfactants in shampoos and bath products, and as emulsifying agents in cosmetics.

== See also ==
- Cocamide
