= Foaming agent =

Substance that facilitates the formation of foam

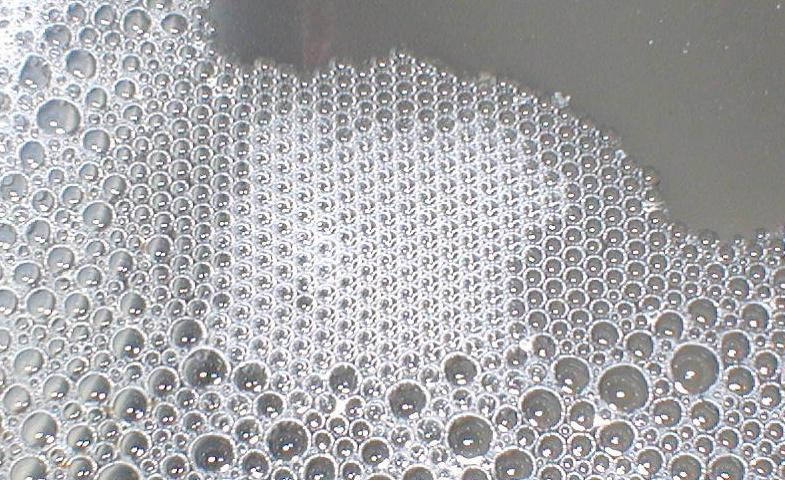
Soap bubbles floating on water

A foaming agent is a material such as a surfactant or a blowing agent that facilitates the formation of foam. A surfactant, when present in small amounts, reduces surface tension of a liquid (reduces the work needed to create the foam) or increases its colloidal stability by inhibiting coalescence of bubbles. A blowing agent is a gas that forms the gaseous part of the foam.

== Surfactants ==
Sodium laureth sulfate, or sodium lauryl ether sulfate (SLES), is a detergent and surfactant found in many personal care products (soaps, shampoos, toothpastes, etc.). It is an inexpensive and effective foamer. Sodium lauryl sulfate (also known as sodium dodecyl sulfate or SDS) and ammonium lauryl sulfate (ALS) are commonly used alternatives to SLES in consumer products.

=== Co-surfactants ===
Surfactants which are less effective at foam production, may have additional co-surfactants added to increase foaming. In which case, the co-surfactant is referred to as the foaming agent. These are surfactants used in lower concentration in a detergent system than the primary surfactant, often the cocamide family of surfactants. Cocamide foaming agents include the nonionic cocamide DEA and cocamidopropylamine oxide, and the zwitterionic cocamidopropyl betaine and cocamidopropyl hydroxysultaine.

== Blowing agents ==
There are two main types of blowing agents: gases at the temperature that the foam is formed, and gases generated by chemical reaction. Carbon dioxide, pentane, and chlorofluorocarbons are examples of the former. Blowing agents that produce gas via chemical reactions include baking powder, azodicarbonamide, titanium hydride, and isocyanates (when they react with water).

== See also ==
- Antifoaming agent
- Sodium coceth sulfate
- Sodium lauryl sulfate
- Sodium bicarbonate
- Sodium laureth sulfate
- Surfactants
