= Poly(amidoamine) =

Class of polymeric molecules

Poly(amidoamine), or PAMAM, is a class of dendrimer which is made of repetitively branched subunits of amide and amine functionality. PAMAM dendrimers, sometimes referred to by the trade name Starburst, have been extensively studied since their synthesis in 1985, and represent the most well-characterized dendrimer family as well as the first to be commercialized. Like other dendrimers, PAMAMs have a sphere-like shape overall, and are typified by an internal molecular architecture consisting of tree-like branching, with each outward 'layer', or generation, containing exponentially more branching points. This branched architecture distinguishes PAMAMs and other dendrimers from traditional polymers, as it allows for low polydispersity and a high level of structural control during synthesis, and gives rise to a large number of surface sites relative to the total molecular volume. Moreover, PAMAM dendrimers exhibit greater biocompatibility than other dendrimer families, perhaps due to the combination of surface amines and interior amide bonds; these bonding motifs are highly reminiscent of innate biological chemistry and endow PAMAM dendrimers with properties similar to that of globular proteins. The relative ease/low cost of synthesis of PAMAM dendrimers (especially relative to similarly-sized biological molecules such as proteins and antibodies), along with their biocompatibility, structural control, and functionalizability, have made PAMAMs viable candidates for application in drug development, biochemistry, and nanotechnology.

== Synthesis ==
=== Divergent synthesis ===
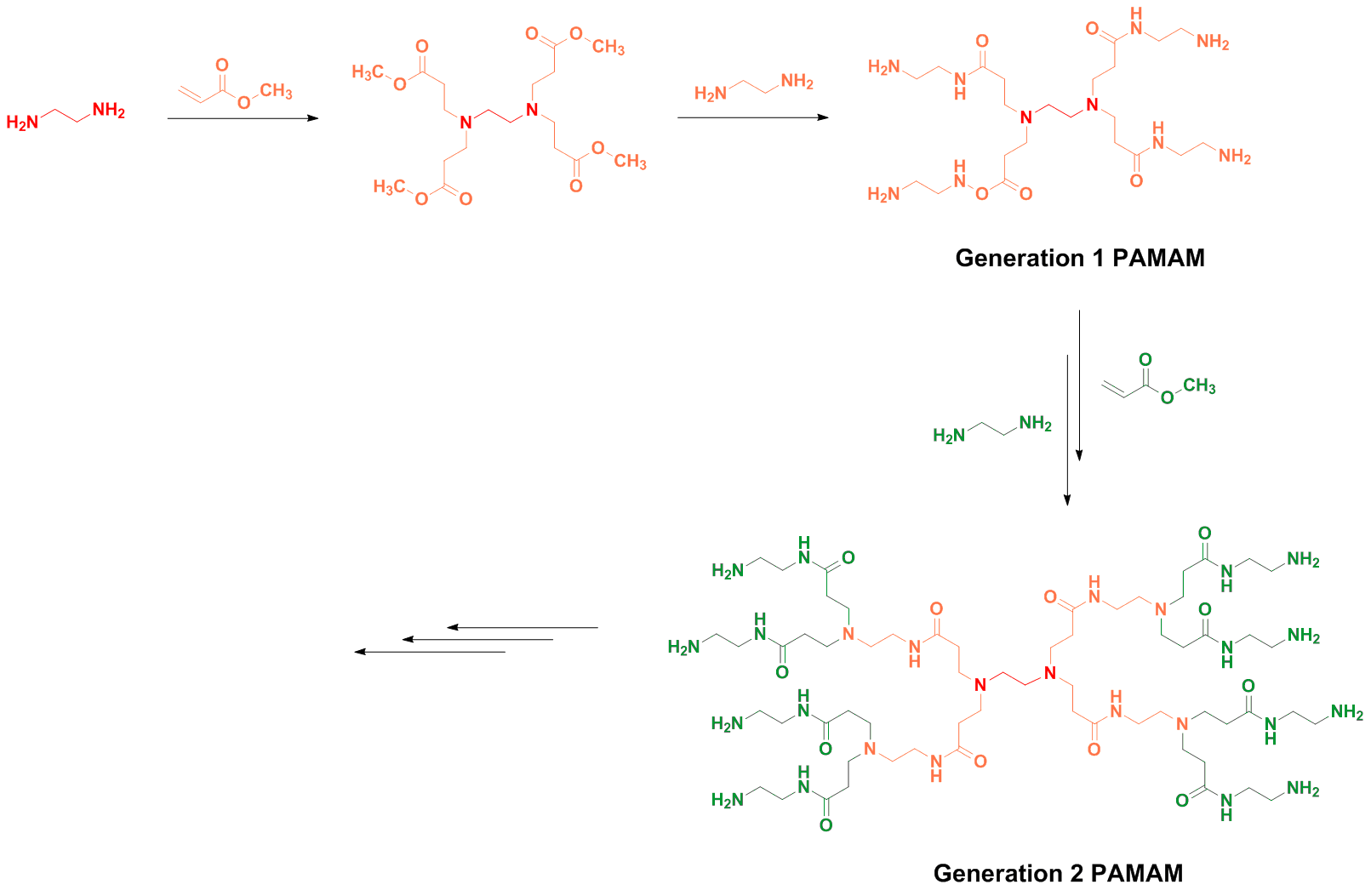
A general scheme for the divergent synthesis of PAMAM dendrimers, with ethylene diamine as a core initiator. The scheme is color-coded by generation number, with the red ethylene diamine core serving as initiator core, orange as Generation 0 and orange/green as Generations 1, respectively. The scheme shown is currently the most widely adopted approach in commercial syntheses of PAMAM. Note: In this picture there is a small error as there is an oxigen atom to much in the first generation of the PAMAM.

Divergent synthesis refers to the sequential "growth" of a dendrimer layer by layer, starting with a core "initiator" molecule which contains functional groups capable of acting as active sites in the initial reaction. Each subsequent reaction in the series increases the number of available surface groups exponentially. Core molecules which give rise to PAMAM dendrimers can vary, but the most basic initiators are ammonia and ethylene diamine. Outward growth of PAMAM dendrimers is accomplished by alternating between two reactions:

1. Michael addition of the amino-terminated surface onto methyl acrylate, resulting in an ester-terminated outer layer, and
2. Coupling with ethylene diamine to achieve a new amino-terminated surface.

Each round of reactions forms a new "generation", and PAMAM dendrimers are often classified by generation number; the common shorthand for this classification is "GX" or "GX PAMAM", where X is a number referring to the generation number. The first full cycle of Michael addition followed by coupling with ethylene diamine forms Generation 0 PAMAM, with subsequent Michael additions giving rise to "half" generations, and subsequent amide coupling giving rise to "full" (integer) generations.

With divergent synthesis of dendrimers, it is extremely important to allow each reaction to proceed to completion; any defects caused by incomplete reaction or intramolecular coupling of new surface amines with unreacted methyl ester surface groups could cause "trailing" generations, stunting further growth for certain branches. These impurities are difficult to remove when using the divergent synthetic approach because the molecular weight, physical size, and chemical properties of the defective dendrimers are very similar in nature to the desired product. As generation number increases, it becomes more difficult to produce pure products in a timely fashion due to steric constraints. As a result, synthesis of higher-generation PAMAM dendrimers can take months.

=== Convergent synthesis ===
Convergent synthesis of a dendrimer begins with what will eventually become the surface of the dendrimer and proceeds inward. The convergent synthetic approach makes use of orthogonal protecting groups (two protecting groups whose deprotection conditions will not remove one another); this is an additional consideration not present when using a divergent approach. The figure below depicts a general scheme for a convergent synthetic approach.

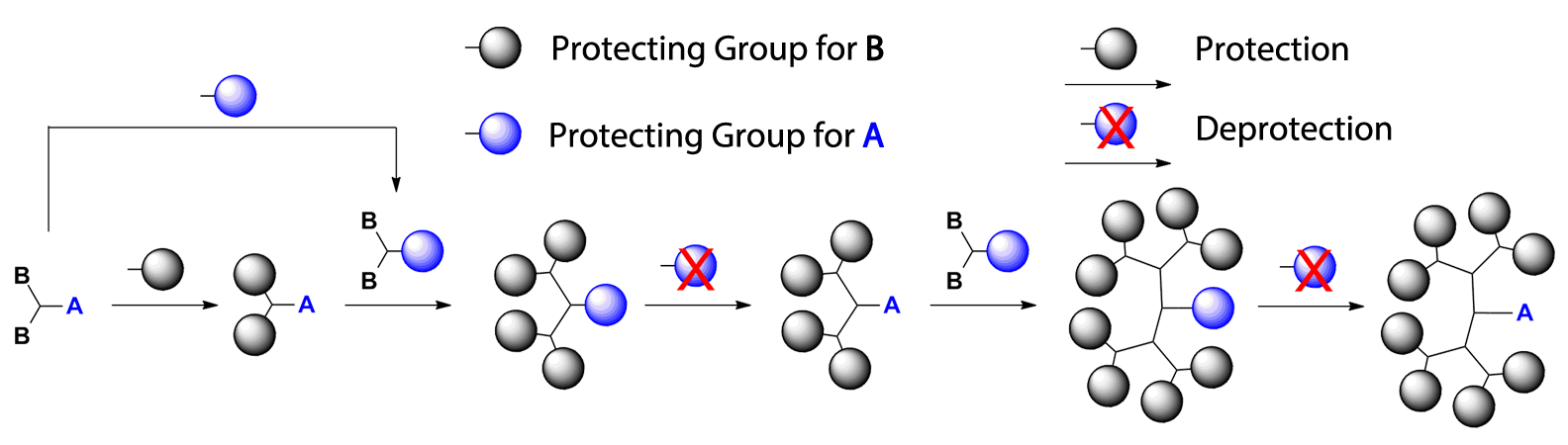
A generalized scheme outlining the use of orthogonal protecting groups for convergent synthesis of PAMAM dendrimers.

Convergent synthesis as shown above begins with the dendritic subunit composed of reactive "focal group" A and branched group B (B can be multiply branched in the most generalized scenario, but PAMAMs only split once at each branching point). First, A is orthogonally protected and set aside for further reactions. B is also orthogonally protected, leaving the unprotected A on this molecule to couple with each of the unprotected B groups from the initial compound. This results in a new higher-generation species that is protected on both A and B. Selective deprotection of A yields a new molecule which can again be coupled onto the original monomer, thus forming another new generation. This process can then be repeated to form more and more layers.

- Note that the black protecting groups for group B represent what will become the outermost layer of the final molecule, and remain attached throughout the synthetic process; their purpose is to guarantee that propagation of dendrimer growth can take place in a controlled fashion by preventing unwanted side reactions.
- In forming each new layer, the number of AB couplings is restricted to two, in sharp contrast to the divergent synthetic approach, which involves exponentially more couplings per layer.
- Incomplete reaction products (single addition adduct, unreacted starting materials) will have a markedly different molecular weight from the desired product, especially for higher-generation compounds, making purification more straightforward.
- The reactive focal group A must be terminated onto a final acceptor at some point during the synthetic process; until then, each compound can only be considered a dendron and not a full dendrimer (see page for disambiguation).
- An advantage to synthesizing dendrons with focal group A as a chemical handle is the ability to attach multiple equivalents of the dendron to a polyfunctional core molecule; changing the core element does not require rebuilding the entire dendrimer. In the case of PAMAM, the focal points of convergently synthesized fragments have been used to create unsymmetrical dendrimers as well as dendrimers with various core functionalization.
- Since each successive generation of dendron becomes bulkier, with final attachment to the dendrimer core being the most prohibitive step of all, steric constraints can severely impact yield.

== Toxicity ==
=== in vitro ===
It has been established that cationic macromolecules in general destabilize the cell membrane, which can lead to lysis and cell death. The common conclusion present in current work echoes this observation: increasing dendrimer molecular weight and surface charge (both being generation-dependent) increases their cytotoxic behavior.

Initial studies on PAMAM toxicity showed that PAMAM was less toxic (in some cases, much less so) than related dendrimers, exhibiting minimal cytotoxicity across multiple toxicity screens, including tests of metabolic activity (MTT assay), cell breakdown (LDH assay), and nucleus morphology (DAPI staining). However, in other cell lines, the MTT assay and several other assays revealed some cytotoxicity. These disparate observations could be due to differences in sensitivity of the various cell lines used in each study to PAMAM; although cytotoxicity for PAMAM varies among cell lines, they remain less toxic than other dendrimer families overall.

More recently, a series of studies by Mukherjee et al. have shed some light on the mechanism of PAMAM cytotoxicity, providing evidence that the dendrimers break free of their encapsulating membrane (endosome) after being absorbed by the cell, causing harm to the cell's mitochondria and eventually leading to cell death. Further elucidation of the mechanism of PAMAM cytotoxicity would help resolve the dispute as to precisely how toxic the dendrimers are.

In relation to neuronal toxicity, fourth generation PAMAM has been shown to break down calcium transients, altering neurotransmitter vesicle dynamics and synaptic transmission. All of the above can be prevented by replacing the surface amines with folate or polyethylene glycol.

It has also been shown that PAMAM dendrimers cause rupturing of red blood cells, or hemolysis. Thus, if PAMAM dendrimers are to be considered in biological applications that involve dendrimers or dendrimer complexes traveling through the bloodstream, the concentration and generation number of unmodified PAMAM in the bloodstream should be taken into account.

=== in vivo ===
To date, few in-depth studies on the in vivo behavior of PAMAM dendrimers have been carried out. This could be in part due to the diverse behavior of PAMAMs depending on surface modification (see below), which make characterization of their in vivo properties largely case-dependent. Nonetheless, the fate and transport of unmodified PAMAM dendrimers is an important case study as any biological applications could involve unmodified PAMAM as a metabolic byproduct. In the only major systematic study of in vivo PAMAM behavior, injections of high levels of bare PAMAMs over extended periods of time in mice showed no evidence of toxicity up through G5 PAMAM, and for G3-G7 PAMAM, low immunogenicity was observed. These systemic-level observations seem to align with the observation that PAMAM dendrimers are not extremely cytotoxic overall; however, more in-depth studies of the pharmacokinetics and biodistribution of PAMAM are required before a move toward in vivo applications can be made.

=== Surface modification ===
One unique property of dendrimers such as PAMAM is the high density of surface functional groups, which allow many alterations to be made to the surface of each dendrimer molecule. In putative PAMAM dendrimers, the surface is rife with primary amines, with higher generations expressing exponentially greater densities of amino groups. Although the potential to attach many things to each dendrimer is one of their greatest advantages, the presence of highly localized positive charges can be toxic to cells. Surface modification via attachment of acetyl and lauroyl groups help mask these positive charges, attenuating cytotoxicity and increasing permeability to cells. Thus, these types of modifications are especially beneficial for biological applications. Secondary and tertiary amino surface groups are also found to be less toxic than primary amino surface groups, suggesting it is charge shielding which has major bearing on cytotoxicity and not some secondary effect from a particular functional group. Furthermore, other studies point to a delicate balance in charge which must be achieved to obtain minimal cytotoxicity. Hydrophobic interactions can also cause cell lysis, and PAMAM dendrimers whose surfaces are saturated with nonpolar modifications such as lipids or polyethylene glycol (PEG) suffer from higher cytotoxicity than their partially substituted analogues. PAMAM dendrimers with nonpolar internal components have also been shown to induce hemolysis.

== Applications ==
Applications involving dendrimers in general take advantage of either stuffing cargo into the interior of the dendrimer (sometimes referred to as the "dendritic box"), or attaching cargo onto the dendrimer surface. PAMAM dendrimer applications have generally focused on surface modification, taking advantage of both electrostatic and covalent methods for binding cargo. Currently, major areas of study using PAMAM dendrimers and their functionalized derivatives involve drug delivery and gene delivery.

=== Drug delivery ===
Since PAMAM dendrimers have shown penetration capability to a wide range of cell lines, simple PAMAM-drug complexes would affect a broad spectrum of cells upon introduction to a living system. Thus, additional targeting ligands are required for the selective penetration of cell types. For example, PAMAM derivatized with folic acid is preferentially taken up by cancer cells, which are known to overexpress the folate receptor on their surfaces. Attaching additional treatment methods along with the folic acid, such as boron isotopes, cisplatin, and methotrexate have proven quite effective. In the future, as synthetic control over dendrimer surface chemistry becomes more robust, PAMAM and other dendrimer families may rise to prominence alongside other major approaches to targeted cancer therapy.

In a study of folic acid functionalized PAMAM, methotrexate was combined either as an inclusion complex within the dendrimer or as a covalent surface attachment. In the case of the inclusion complex, the drug was released from the dendrimer interior almost immediately when subjected to biological conditions and acted similarly to the free drug. The surface attachment approach yielded stable, soluble complexes which were able to selectively target cancer cells and did not prematurely release their cargo. Drug release in the case of the inclusion complex could be explained by the protonation of surface and interior amines under biological conditions, leading to unpacking of the dendrimer conformation and consequent release of the inner cargo. A similar phenomenon was observed with complexes of PAMAM and cisplatin.

PAMAM dendrimers have also demonstrated intrinsic drug properties. One quite notable example is the ability for PAMAM dendrimers to remove prion protein aggregates, the deadly protein aggregates responsible for bovine spongiform encephalopathy ("mad cow disease") and Creutzfeldt–Jakob disease in humans. The solubilization of prions is attributed to the polycationic and dendrimeric nature of the PAMAMs, with higher generation (>G3) dendrimers being the most efficient; hydroxy-terminated PAMAMs as well as linear polymers showed little to no effect. Since there are no other known compounds capable of dissolving prions which have already aggregated, PAMAM dendrimers have offered a bit of reprieve in the study of such fatal diseases, and may offer additional insight into the mechanism of prion formation.

=== Gene therapy ===
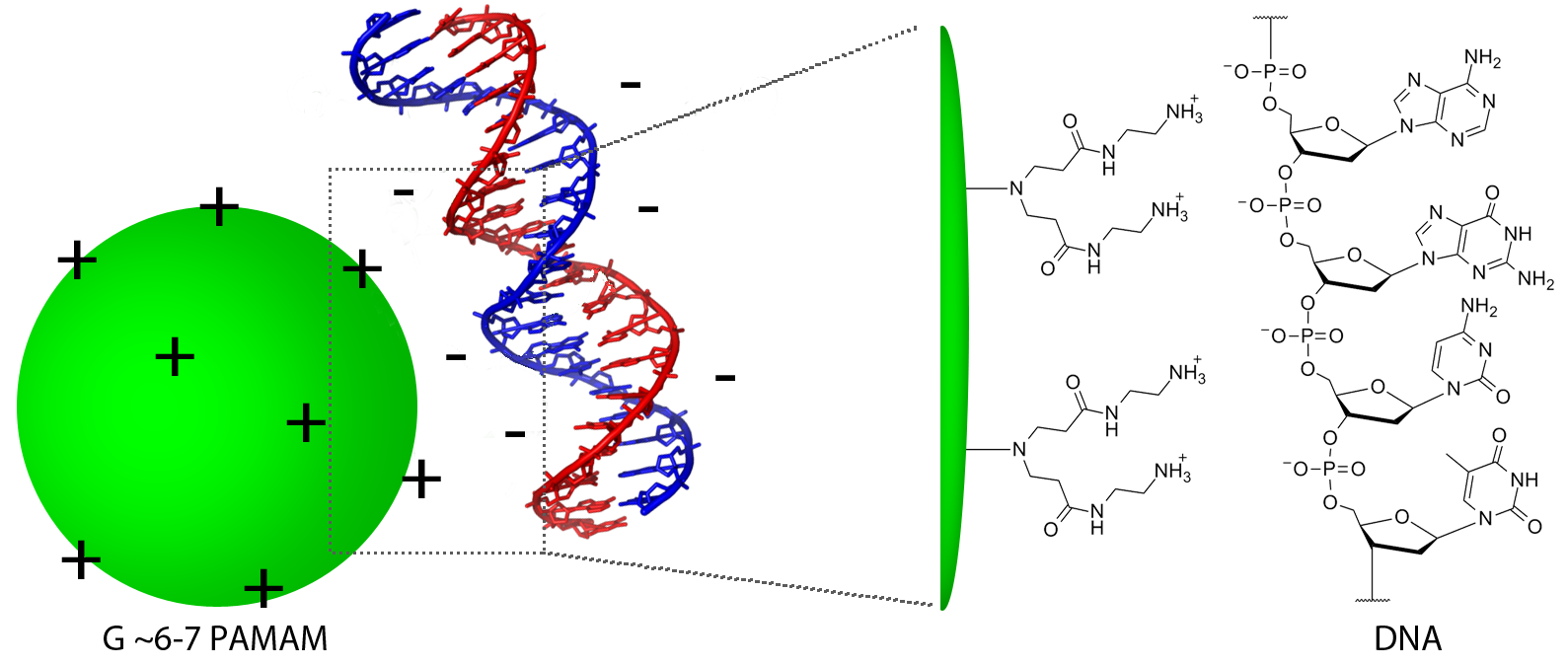
Surface amine residues on PAMAM dendrimers bind to the phosphate backbone of nucleic acids through charged interactions (right, inset). Typically, G6-7 PAMAM dendrimers are used for gene transfection; these dendrimers are typically 6-10nm in length (spanning ~20-30 base pairs) and have a molecular mass of 30-50kDa.

The discovery that mediating positive charge on PAMAM dendrimer surfaces decreases their cytotoxicity has interesting implications for DNA transfection applications. Because the cell membrane has a negatively charged exterior, and the DNA phosphate backbone is also negatively charged, the transfection of free DNA is not very efficient simply due to charge repulsion. However, it would be reasonable to expect charged interactions between the anionic phosphate backbone of DNA and the amino-terminated surface groups of PAMAM dendrimers, which are positively ionized under physiological conditions. This could result in a PAMAM-DNA complex, which would make DNA transfection more efficient due to neutralization of the charges on both elements, while the cytotoxicity of the PAMAM dendrimer would also be reduced. Indeed, several reports have confirmed PAMAM dendrimers as effective DNA transfection agents.

When the charge balance between DNA phosphates and PAMAM surface amines is slightly positive, the maximum transfection efficiency is obtained; this finding supports the idea that the complex binds to the cell surface via charge interactions. A striking observation is that "activation" of PAMAM by partial degradation via hydrolysis improves transfection efficiency by 2-3 orders of magnitude, providing further evidence supporting the existence of an electrostatically coupled complex. The fragmentation of some branches of the dendrimer is thought to loosen up the overall structure (fewer amide bonds and space constraints), which would theoretically result in better contact between the dendrimer and DNA substrate because the dendrimer is not forced into a rigid spherical conformation due to sterics. This in turn results in more compact DNA complexes which are more easily endocytosed. After endocytosis, the complexes are subjected to the acidic conditions of the cellular endosome. The PAMAM dendrimers act as a buffer in this environment, soaking up the excess protons with multitudes of amine residues, leading to the inhibition of pH-dependent endosomal nuclease activity and thus protecting the cargo DNA. The tertiary amines on the interior of the dendrimer can also participate in the buffering activity, causing the molecule to puff up; additionally, as the PAMAMs take on more and more positive charge, fewer of them are required for the optimal PAMAM-DNA interaction, and free dendrimers are released from the complex. Dendrimer release and swelling can eventually lyse the endosome, resulting in release of the cargo DNA. The activated PAMAM dendrimers have less spatial barrier to interior amine protonation, which is thought to be a major source of their advantage over non-activated PAMAM.

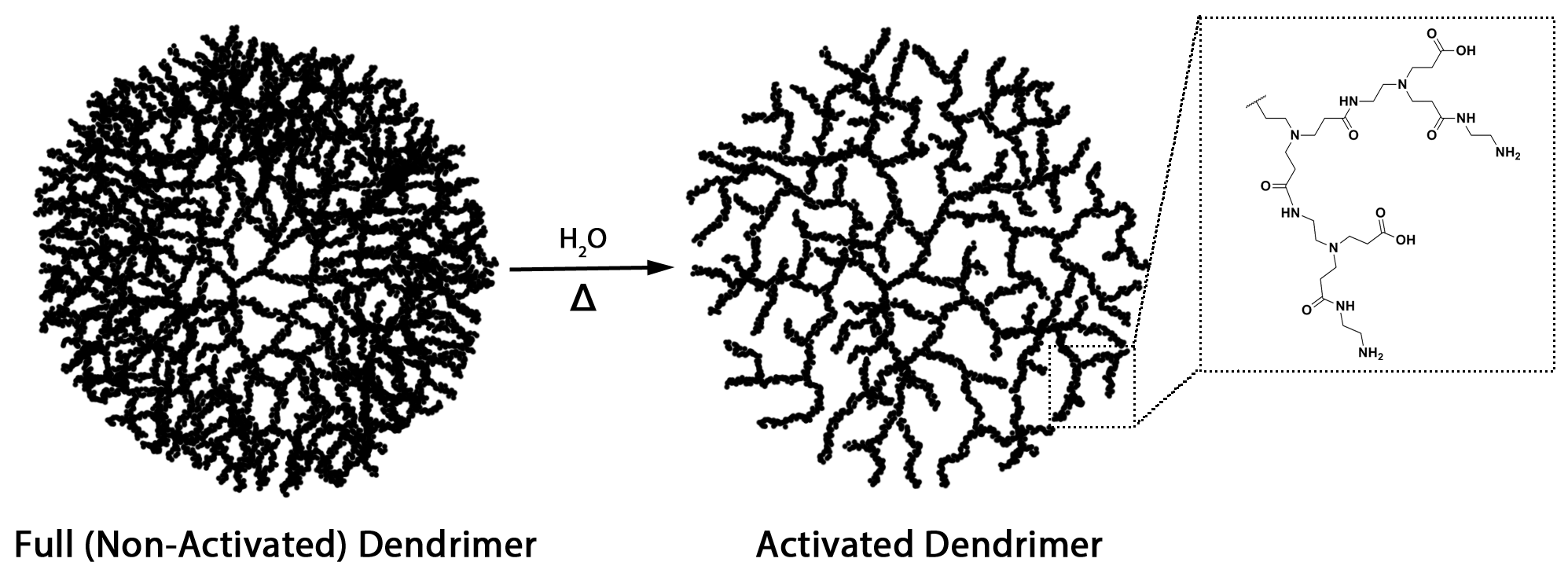
PAMAM dendrimers can be "activated" for gene transfer applications via hydrolysis accelerated by heat, a process which can be thought of as similar to shearing bushes. During this process, amide bonds are broken and replaced with carboxyl groups (see inset), causing some branches of the dendrimer to fall off. The overall molecular mass of the dendrimer is reduced by 20-25%, and the result is a more flexible dendrimer with transfection efficiencies improved by 2-3 orders of magnitude.

In the context of existing approaches to gene transfer, PAMAM dendrimers hold a strong position relative to major classical technologies such as electroporation, microinjection, and viral methods. Electroporation, which involves pulsing electricity through cells to create holes in the membrane through which DNA can enter, has obvious cytotoxic effects and is not appropriate for in vivo applications. On the other hand, microinjection, the use of fine needles to physically inject genetic material into the cell nucleus, offers more control but is a high-skill, meticulous task in which a relatively low number of cells can be transfected. Although viral vectors can offer highly specific, high-efficiency transfection, the generation of such viruses is costly and time-consuming; furthermore, the inherent viral nature of the gene transfer often triggers an immune response, thus limiting in vivo applications. In fact, many modern transfection technologies are based on artificially assembled liposomes (both liposomes and PAMAMs are positively charged macromolecules). Since PAMAM dendrimers and their complexes with DNA exhibit low cytotoxicity, higher transfection efficiencies than liposome-based methods, and are effective across a broad range of cell lines, they have taken an important place in modern gene therapy methodologies. The biotechnology company Qiagen currently offers two DNA transfection product lines (SuperFect and PolyFect) based on activated PAMAM dendrimer technology.

Much work lies ahead before activated PAMAM dendrimers can be used as in vivo gene therapy agents. Although the dendrimers have proved to be highly efficient and non-toxic in vitro, the stability, behavior, and transport of the transfection complex in biological systems has yet to be characterized and optimized. As with drug delivery applications, specific targeting of the transfection complex is ideal and must be explored as well.

== See also ==
- Amidoamine

== Bibliography ==
- Pittelkow M, Christensen JB (March 2005). "Convergent synthesis of internally branched PAMAM dendrimers". Organic Letters. 7 (7): 1295–8. doi:10.1021/ol050040d. PMID 15787490.
- Li J, Piehler LT, Qin D, Baker JR, Tomalia DA, Meier DJ (2000). "Visualization and Characterization of Poly(amidoamine) Dendrimers by Atomic Force Microscopy". Langmuir. 16 (13): 5613–5616. doi:10.1021/la000035c.
- Sadekar S, Ghandehari H (May 2012). "Transepithelial transport and toxicity of PAMAM dendrimers: implications for oral drug delivery". Advanced Drug Delivery Reviews. 64 (6): 571–88. doi:10.1016/j.addr.2011.09.010. PMC 3305851. PMID 21983078.
- Tono Y, Kojima C, Haba Y, Takahashi T, Harada A, Yagi S, Kono K (May 2006). "Thermosensitive properties of poly(amidoamine) dendrimers with peripheral phenylalanine residues". Langmuir. 22 (11): 4920–2. doi:10.1021/la060066t. PMID 16700575.
- Singh P, Moll F, Lin SH, Ferzli C, Yu KS, Koski RK, et al. (September 1994). "Starburst dendrimers: enhanced performance and flexibility for immunoassays". Clinical Chemistry. 40 (9): 1845–9. doi:10.1093/clinchem/40.9.1845. PMID 8070111.
- Lamy CM, Sallin O, Loussert C, Chatton JY (February 2012). "Sodium sensing in neurons with a dendrimer-based nanoprobe" (PDF). ACS Nano. 6 (2): 1176–87. doi:10.1021/nn203822t. PMID 22288942.
- Krasteva N, Besnard I, Guse B, Bauer RE, Müllen K, Yasuda A, Vossmeyer T (2002). "Self-Assembled Gold Nanoparticle/Dendrimer Composite Films for Vapor Sensing Applications". Nano Letters. 2 (5): 551–5. Bibcode:2002NanoL...2..551K. doi:10.1021/nl020242s.
- Grabchev I, Soumillion JP, Muls B, Ivanova G (2004). "Poly(amidoamine) dendrimer peripherally modified with 4-N,N-dimethylaminoethyleneamino-1,8-naphthalimide as a sensor of metal cations and protons". Photochemical & Photobiological Sciences. 3 (11–12): 1032–7. Bibcode:2004PhPhS...3.1032G. doi:10.1039/B412384K. PMID 15570391. S2CID 115521.
- Wu C, Brechbiel MW, Kozak RW, Gansow OA (1994). "Metal-chelate-dendrimer-antibody constructs for use in radioimmunotherapy and imaging". Bioorganic & Medicinal Chemistry Letters. 4 (3): 449–54. doi:10.1016/0960-894X(94)80014-6.
- Wells M, Crooks RM (1996). "Interactions between Organized, Surface-Confined Monolayers and Vapor-Phase Probe Molecules. 10. Preparation and Properties of Chemically Sensitive Dendrimer Surfaces". Journal of the American Chemical Society. 118 (16): 3988–9. doi:10.1021/ja960097i.
- Chauhan AS, Sridevi S, Chalasani KB, Jain AK, Jain SK, Jain NK, Diwan PV (July 2003). "Dendrimer-mediated transdermal delivery: enhanced bioavailability of indomethacin". Journal of Controlled Release. 90 (3): 335–43. doi:10.1016/S0168-3659(03)00200-1. PMID 12880700.
- Myc A, Majoros IJ, Thomas TP, Baker JR (January 2007). "Dendrimer-based targeted delivery of an apoptotic sensor in cancer cells". Biomacromolecules. 8 (1): 13–8. doi:10.1021/bm060815l. PMID 17206782.
- Mark SS, Sandhyarani N, Zhu C, Campagnolo C, Batt CA (August 2004). "Dendrimer-functionalized self-assembled monolayers as a surface plasmon resonance sensor surface". Langmuir. 20 (16): 6808–17. doi:10.1021/la0495276. PMID 15274589.
- Albertazzi L, Storti B, Marchetti L, Beltram F (December 2010). "Delivery and subcellular targeting of dendrimer-based fluorescent pH sensors in living cells". Journal of the American Chemical Society. 132 (51): 18158–67. doi:10.1021/ja105689u. PMID 21141854.
- Roberts JC, Bhalgat MK, Zera RT (January 1996). "Preliminary biological evaluation of polyamidoamine (PAMAM) Starburst dendrimers". Journal of Biomedical Materials Research. 30 (1): 53–65. doi:10.1002/(SICI)1097-4636(199601)30:1<53::AID-JBM8>3.0.CO;2-Q. PMID 8788106.
- Li C, Liu H, Sun Y, Wang H, Guo F, Rao S, et al. (October 2009). "PAMAM nanoparticles promote acute lung injury by inducing autophagic cell death through the Akt-TSC2-mTOR signaling pathway". Journal of Molecular Cell Biology. 1 (1): 37–45. doi:10.1093/jmcb/mjp002. PMID 19516051.
- Majoros IJ, Myc A, Thomas T, Mehta CB, Baker JR (February 2006). "PAMAM dendrimer-based multifunctional conjugate for cancer therapy: synthesis, characterization, and functionality". Biomacromolecules. 7 (2): 572–9. doi:10.1021/bm0506142. PMID 16471932.
- Kukowska-Latallo JF, Candido KA, Cao Z, Nigavekar SS, Majoros IJ, Thomas TP, et al. (June 2005). "Nanoparticle targeting of anticancer drug improves therapeutic response in animal model of human epithelial cancer". Cancer Research. 65 (12): 5317–24. doi:10.1158/0008-5472.CAN-04-3921. PMID 15958579.
