= Hydroxysultaine =

Class of chemical compounds

Amidopropyl Hydroxysultaine, R= long hydrophobic tail

Hydroxysultaines are chemical compounds used in high-foaming shampoos, bath products and shower gels especially in conjunction with ether sulfates and alkyl sulfates. They are also used in industrial applications where high, stable foam is required. Chemically, hydroxysultaines are zwitterionic, typically containing covalently linked positive and negative ions.

== Synthesis ==
Hydroxysultaine is prepared industrially by the reaction of sodium bisulfite with epichlorohydrin to give the sodium salt (sodium 1-chloro-2-hydroxypropane sulfonate). This is similar to the synthesis of isethionate, which is also used as a 'head-group' in surfactants. It is typically combined with the rest of the surfactant molecule via a Menshutkin reaction with a tertiary amine.

== Properties ==
Hydroxysultaines are also compatible with cationic surfactants and are stable over a wide pH range in soft or hard water. In addition to being used as a surfactant, hydroxysultaines are often used as antistatic agents.

== Examples ==
Examples include:

- ISOTAINE LAPHS – Lauramidopropyl hydroxysultaine; derived from (C12:0) lauric acid.
- ISOTAINE CAPHS – Cocamidopropyl hydroxysultaine; cocamide is from a mixture of coconut fatty acids, 50% derived from (C12:0) lauric acid.
- ISOTAINE OAPHS – Oleamidopropyl hydroxysultaine; oleamide is from a monounsaturated omega-9 fatty acid, lipid number of 18:1 cis-9, formula CH_{3}(CH_{2})_{7}CH=CH(CH_{2})_{7}COOH.
- ISOTAINE TAPHS – Tallowamidopropyl hydroxysultaine; tallow is a mixture of fatty acids derived from beef or mutton fat,
- ISOTAINE EAPHS – Erucamidopropyl hydroxysultaine; erucic acid is a monounsaturated omega-9 fatty acid, denoted 22:1ω9.
- ISOTAINE LHS – Lauryl hydroxysultaine; lauryl refers to fatty acid, lipid number C12:0
