= Amidoamine =

Class of chemical compounds

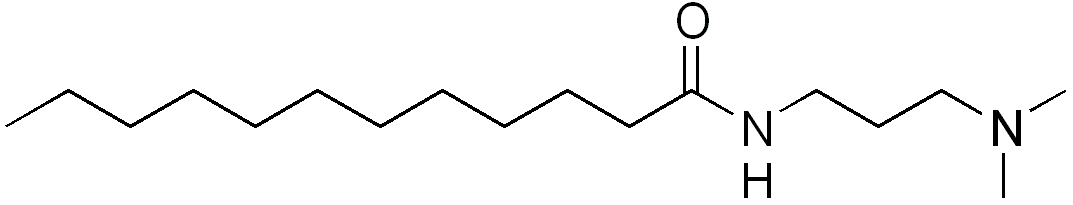
Lauramidopropyldimethylamine, an amidoamine used in the preparation of CAPB

Amidoamines are a class of chemical compounds that are formed from fatty acids and amines. They are used as intermediates in the synthesis of surfactants, such as cocamidopropyl betaine (CAPB), some of which are used in personal care products including soaps, shampoos, and cosmetics. Amidoamines can also serve as curing agents for epoxy resins. They are also used as oil well drilling fluids and also as corrosion inhibitors.

Patch test studies have concluded that most apparent allergic reactions to products containing CAPB are more likely due to amidoamine than to CAPB itself.

== See also ==
- Poly(amidoamine)

== External websites ==
- Amidoamines at Hexion
