= Brewmaxx =

brewmaxx
- Developer: ProLeit AG
- Operating system: Windows
- License: Proprietary commercial
- Website: www.brewmaxx.com

brewmaxx is a process control system for the brewing industry. The various process steps of a brewery can be automated, controlled and monitored via the software components of the brewmaxx range.

== Fields of application ==
Due to its scalability, brewmaxx is suited to applications ranging from single station to multiserver systems. It is used in:

- small breweries (up to 50 hectolitres per brew)
- medium-sized breweries (up to 1 million hectolitres per annum)
- large breweries (more than 1 million hectolitres per annum)

The main fields of application include the automation of breweries (see brewery) and/or fermenting and storage cellars. Also a complete automation of all the production areas of a brewery (e.g. at Warsteiner Beer and Brewery) - from raw material intake to filling - can be realised with the brewmaxx process control systems. The "small" control system, brewmaxx compact, has been available for individual production areas, e.g. ancillary plants, water treatment, filter or CO_{2} plants as well as small and medium-sized breweries, since the middle of 2010.

The systems and modules of brewmaxx are generally used for the automation of new plants and for migration projects. Existing, outdated control systems with a structured software design can be migrated to brewmaxx via conversion tools.

Brewmaxx is used as teaching system for process control technology for breweries at the Technical University of Munich. Various university projects use brewmaxx as process controlling system.

== Architecture ==
The brewmaxx range is based on an integrated client-server model and uses standard Microsoft software. The architecture has a modular design. Depending on the requirements, the modules can be used individually or in combination for process control, data acquisition, process management, production management and enterprise resource planning level integration.

brewmaxx has been designed as a multilingual system. At application level, it offers a computer-independent language changeover option for the user interface and can be configured in several languages. Communication takes place via the Ethernet connections TCP/IP and OPC.

OPC (see OLE for process control) is preferably used as the interface; However, various OPC servers might be used depending on the control units to be integrated. Furthermore, a driver-based interface is available for non OPC-capable systems. This ensures simple and flexible integration of numerous control systems, e.g. from Mitsubishi Electric, Allen-Bradley, Siemens, VIPA and others. Various reporting functions enable selective access to recorded process and material data.

Modules

brewmaxx material is a process-oriented material management system, offering a precise 'per transaction' online view of all material movements. Besides inventory management, the acquisition of this information also enables research, statistical evaluations and batch tracking.

The brewmaxx integrate module records process-relevant information from different plants and process areas and enables their division-independent integration with regard to information management. The reporting component of brewmaxx integrate works also with web-based clients.

brewmaxx connect is a freely parameterisable interface for universal data exchange between brewmaxx systems and various third party systems. These include client/server or host-based systems, e.g. ERP, LIMS and maintenance systems, but also intelligent measuring and analysis instruments (e.g. inspectors and weighing systems).

== Standards ==
Production data acquisition with brewmaxx Acquis iT is based on the Weihenstephan Standards. In cooperation with industry representatives and with the support of Wissenschaftsförderung der Deutschen Brauwirtschaft, the chair of Food Packaging Technology at the Technical University of Munich in Weihenstephan has developed a standard for the connection of BDE systems to bottling plants.

The standard includes the uniform provision and structure of data from the control units of various manufacturers. The Weihenstephan Standards 2000 comprise the guidelines for standard BDE specifications for bottling plants; the Weihenstephan Standards 2005 describe the interfaces and data provision for bottling and packaging plants in the beverage industry.

== Distribution ==
Brewmaxx has an installation base that includes German breweries Erdinger, Köstritzer, Oettinger or Warsteiner, and others. Internationally, the system is utilized by brewers including Anheuser-Busch, MillerCoors, Heineken, Carlsberg Group, and the Tsingtao Brewery.

== History ==
The predecessor systems of the brewmaxx platform already provided the technological functions (TF) for brewery-specific requirements. The big brother of brewmaxx is the process control system Plant iT, developed and distributed by ProLeiT AG. Plant iT is the industry-independent solution for the following areas: food & beverages, dairy industry, feeding stuff, pharma & chemical industry, biodiesel & bioethanol. In many areas, it is identical to the brewmaxx components, but additionally comprises an ISA 88 compliant batch system (see Batch production). The software has been distributed and continuously further developed under the name brewmaxx since 1997.
