= Cocamidopropyl betaine =

Lauramidopropyl betaine
- Structural formula of lauramidopropyl betaine Lauramidopropyl betaine, the major component of cocamidopropyl betaine

Names
- IUPAC name {[3-(Dodecanoylamino)propyl](dimethyl)ammonio}acetate
- Other names 2-[(3-Dodecanamidopropyl)dimethylamino]acetate

Identifiers
CAS Number	61789-40-0
3D model (JSmol)	Interactive image; Interactive image; Interactive image
ChemSpider	19106
ECHA InfoCard	100.057.308
EC Number	263-058-8
PubChem CID	20280
UNII	5OCF3O11KX
CompTox Dashboard (EPA)	DTXSID6028072
- InChI: InChI=1S/C19H38N2O3/c1-4-5-6-7-8-9-10-11-12-14-18(22)20-15-13-16-21(2,3)17-19(23)24/h4-17H2,1-3H3,(H-,20,22,23,24) Key: MRUAUOIMASANKQ-UHFFFAOYSA-N; InChI=1/C19H38N2O3/c1-4-5-6-7-8-9-10-11-12-14-18(22)20-15-13-16-21(2,3)17-19(23)24/h4-17H2,1-3H3,(H-,20,22,23,24) Key: MRUAUOIMASANKQ-UHFFFAOYAL
- SMILES: CCCCCCCCCCCC(=O)NCCC[N+](C)(C)CC([O-])=O; CCCCCCCCCCCC(=O)NCCC[N+](C)(C)CC(=O)[O-]; [O-]C(=O)C[N+](CCCNC(=O)CCCCCCCCCCC)(C)C

Properties
Chemical formula	C_{19}H_{38}N_{2}O_{3}
Molar mass	342.524 g·mol^{−1}
Appearance	Clear to slight yellow liquid
Density	1.05 g/cm^{3}
Melting point	< −10 °C (14 °F; 263 K)
Boiling point	> 100 °C (212 °F; 373 K)
Solubility in water	Soluble
Viscosity	< 100 cP (30°C)

Hazards
- GHS labelling
Pictograms	(GHS09: Environmental hazard)
Signal word	Warning
Hazard statements	H315, H319, H400
NFPA 704 (fire diamond)	2 1 0
- Except where otherwise noted, data are given for materials in their standard state (at 25 °C [77 °F], 100 kPa). verify (what is ?) Infobox references

Cocamidopropyl betaine (CAPB) is a mixture of closely related organic compounds derived from coconut oil and dimethylaminopropylamine. CAPB is available as a viscous pale yellow solution and it is used as a surfactant in personal care products and animal husbandry. The name reflects that the major part of the molecule, the lauric acid group, is derived from coconut oil. Cocamidopropyl betaine to a significant degree has replaced cocamide DEA.

== Production ==
Despite the name cocamidopropyl betaine, the molecule is not synthesized from betaine. Instead it is produced in a two-step manner, beginning with the reaction of dimethylaminopropylamine (DMAPA) with fatty acids from coconut or palm kernel oil (lauric acid, or its methyl ester, is the main constituent). The primary amine in DMAPA is more reactive than the tertiary amine, leading to its selective addition to form an amide. In the second step chloroacetic acid reacts with the remaining tertiary amine to form a quaternary ammonium center (a quaternization reaction).

CH_{3}(CH_{2})_{10}COOH + H_{2}NCH_{2}CH_{2}CH_{2}N(CH_{3})_{2} → CH_{3}(CH_{2})_{10}CONHCH_{2}CH_{2}CH_{2}N(CH_{3})_{2}
CH_{3}(CH_{2})_{10}CONHCH_{2}CH_{2}CH_{2}N(CH_{3})_{2} + ClCH_{2}CO_{2}H + NaOH → CH_{3}(CH_{2})_{10}CONHCH_{2}CH_{2}CH_{2}N^{+}(CH_{3})_{2}CH_{2}CO_{2}^{−} + NaCl + H_{2}O

== Chemistry ==
CAPB is a fatty acid amide that contains a long hydrocarbon chain at one end and a polar group at the other. This allows CAPB to act as a surfactant and as a detergent. It is a zwitterion, consisting of both a quaternary ammonium cation and a carboxylate.

== Specifications and properties ==
Cocamidopropyl betaine is used as a foam booster in shampoos. It is a medium-strength surfactant also used in bath products like hand soaps. It is also used in cosmetics as an emulsifying agent and thickener, and to reduce the irritation that purely ionic surfactants would cause. It also serves as an antistatic agent in hair conditioners, which most often does not irritate skin or mucous membranes. However, some studies indicate it is an allergen.

CAPB is also used as a co-surfactant with Sodium dodecyl sulfate for promoting the formation of gas hydrates. CAPB, as an additive, helps to scale up the gas hydrates' formation process.

CAPB is obtained as an aqueous solution in concentrations of about 30%.

Typical impurities of leading manufacturers today:

- Sodium monochloroacetate < 5 ppm
- Amidoamine (AA) < 0.3%
- Dimethylaminopropylamine (DMAPA) < 15 ppm
- Glycerol < 3%

The impurities AA and DMAPA are most critical, as they have been shown to be responsible for skin sensitization reactions. These by-products can be avoided by a moderate excess chloroacetate and the exact adjustment of pH value during betainization reaction accompanied by regular analytical control.

== Safety ==
CAPB has been claimed to cause allergic reactions in some users, but a controlled pilot study has found that these cases may represent irritant reactions rather than true allergic reactions. Furthermore, results of human studies have shown that CAPB has a low sensitizing potential if impurities with amidoamine (AA) and dimethylaminopropylamine (DMAPA) are low and tightly controlled. Other studies have concluded that most apparent allergic reactions to CAPB are more likely due to amidoamine. Cocamidopropyl betaine was voted 2004 Allergen of the Year by the American Contact Dermatitis Society.

== See also ==
- Cocamidopropyl hydroxysultaine
