= Weihenstephan Standards =

Communication interfaces for machine data acquisition

The Weihenstephan Standards ("Weihenstephaner Standard" in German), also referred to as "WS" in shorthand, are communication interfaces for machine data acquisition.

The standards were developed by a working group of machine manufacturers, plant suppliers, IT system vendors and technologists, under the guidance of the Technical University of Munich (TUM) at the Faculty of Food Packaging Technology in Weihenstephan, Germany.

Weihenstephan libraries have been developed for production data acquisition in bottling and packaging plants (WS Pack), food industry plants (WS Food), in the bakery industry (WS Bake), and for processes within the brewing industry (WS Brew). These libraries are used to connect the plants industrial equipment within the production processes to higher-level management and control systems such as data acquisition systems (SCADA) or Manufacturing Execution Systems (MES). In the Weihenstephan Standards, the physical interface specification, specification of the interface content, recommendations for data evaluation and reporting are defined.

The Weihenstephan Standards 2000 comprise the guidelines for standard BDE specifications for bottling plants; the Weihenstephan Standards 2005 describe the interfaces and data provision for bottling and packaging plants in the beverage industry.

== Description ==
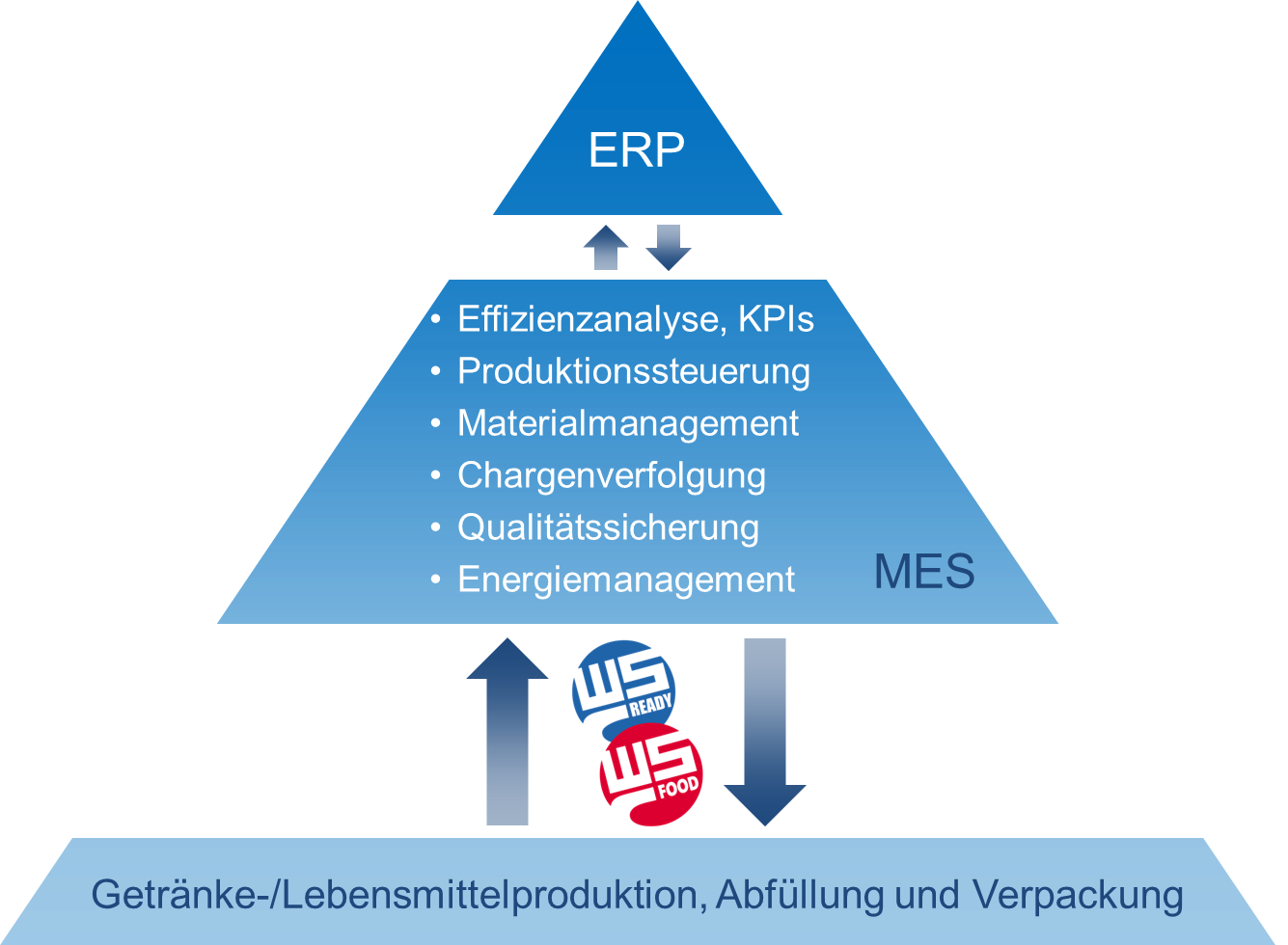
Weihenstephan standards in the automation pyramid (image text in German)

The Weihenstephan standards are located in the automation pyramid as a link between the production management level and the process control level. The standards allow an MES to exchange data with the controls of various machines and thus support the MES' operation. To help manage the data the standards provide:

1. uniform physical interface
2. uniform instruction set and
3. uniform database requirement

In addition, industry-specific reports and evaluation examples are available in the Weihenstephan Standards.

== See also ==
Brewmaxx
