= Coconut oil =

Edible oil derived from coconut

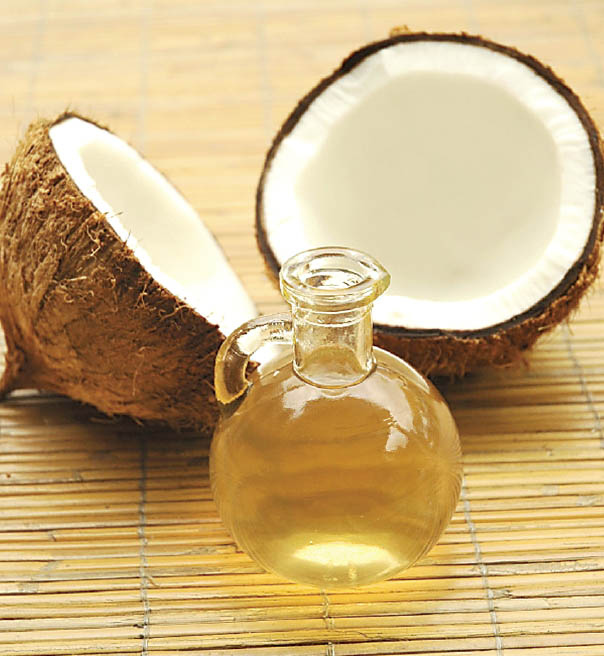

Coconut oil (or coconut fat) is an edible oil derived from the meat of the coconut palm fruit. Coconut oil is a white solid fat below around 25 °C (77 °F), and a clear thin liquid oil at higher temperatures. Unrefined varieties have a distinct coconut aroma. Coconut oil is used as a food oil, and in industrial applications for cosmetics and detergent production. The oil is rich in medium-chain fatty acids.

Due to its high levels of saturated fat, numerous health authorities recommend limiting its consumption as a food.

Coconut oil is widely used for cooking and baking due to its high smoke point and distinct flavor.

== Manufacturing ==
Coconut oil can be extracted through a wet or dry process. More simply (but perhaps less effectively), oil can be produced by heating the meat via boiling water, the sun or a slow fire.

=== Wet process ===
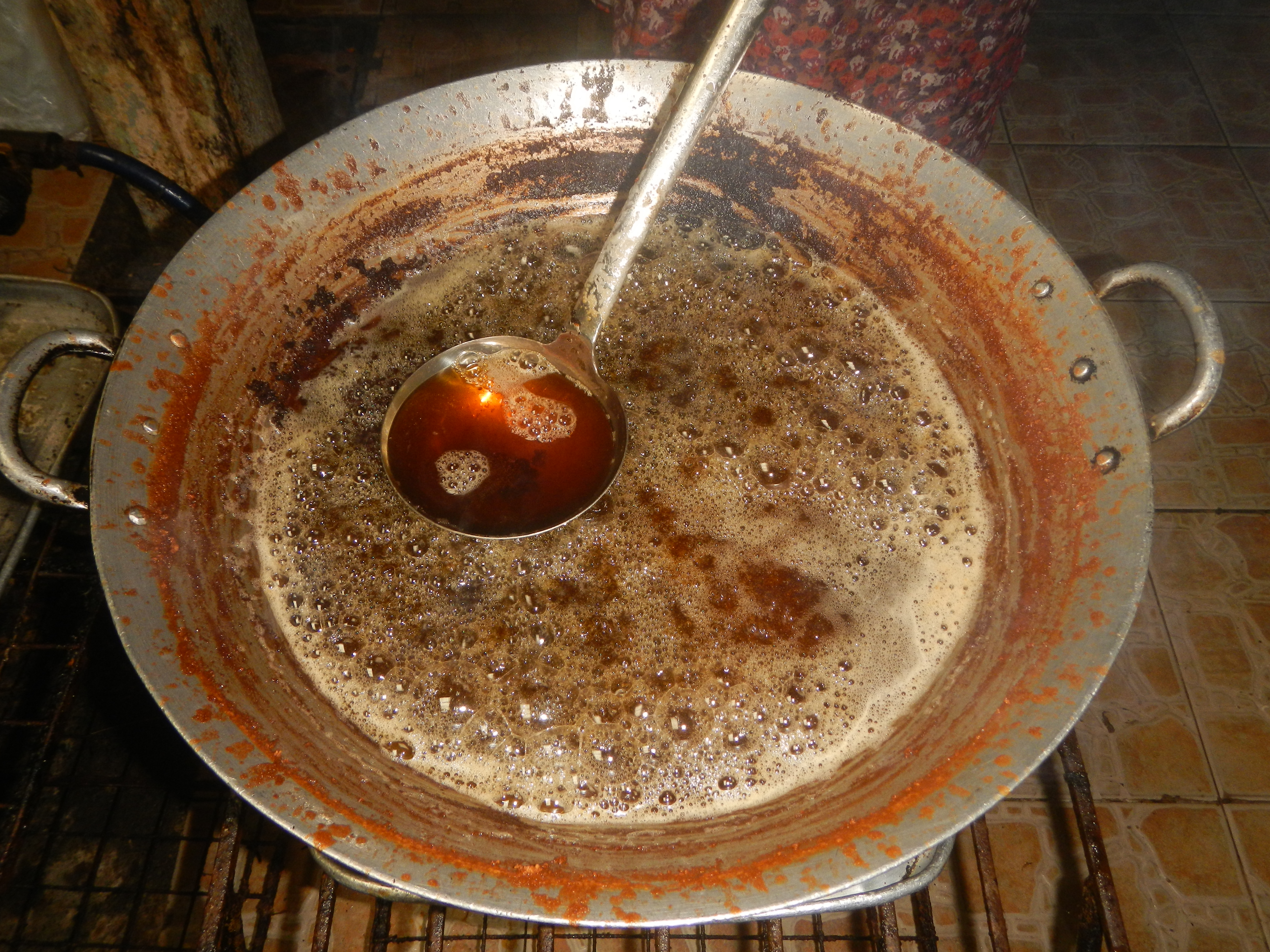
Traditional (lana) extraction directly from the milk in the Philippines. The process also produces latik (curds), used as a garnish in Filipino desserts.

The all-wet process uses coconut milk extracted from raw coconut rather than dried copra. The proteins in the coconut milk create an emulsion of oil and water. The more problematic step is breaking up the emulsion to recover the oil. This used to be done by prolonged boiling, but this produces a discolored oil and is not economical. Modern techniques use centrifuges and pre-treatments including cold, heat, acids, salts, enzymes, electrolysis, shock waves, steam distillation, or some combination thereof. Despite numerous variations and technologies, wet processing is less viable than dry processing due to a 10–15% lower yield, even taking into account the losses due to spoilage and pests with dry processing. Wet processes also require investment in equipment and energy, incurring high capital and operating costs.

=== Dry process ===
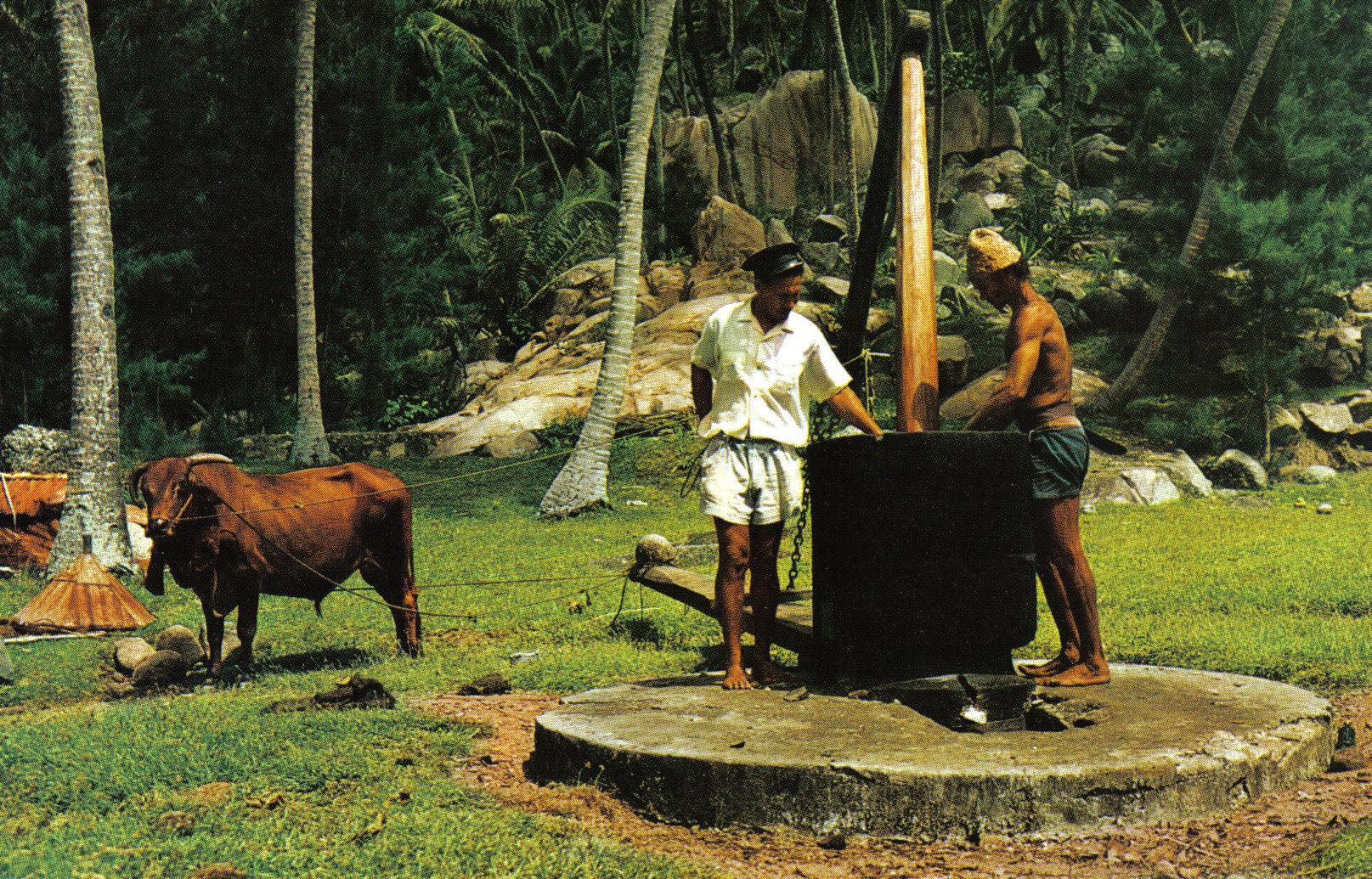
Traditional manufacturing in Seychelles

Dry processing requires that the meat be extracted from the shell and dried using fire, sunlight, or kilns to create copra. The copra is pressed or dissolved with solvents, producing the coconut oil and a high-protein, high-fiber mash. The mash is of poor quality for human consumption and is instead fed to ruminants; there is no process to extract protein from the mash.

Proper harvesting of the coconut (the age of a coconut can be 2 to 20 months when picked) makes a significant difference in the efficacy of the oil-making process. Copra made from immature nuts is more difficult to work with and produces an inferior product with lower yields.

Conventional coconut oil processors use hexane as a solvent to extract up to 10% more oil than is produced with just rotary mills and expellers. They then refine the oil to remove certain free fatty acids to reduce susceptibility to rancidification. Other processes to increase shelf life include using copra with a moisture content below 6%, keeping the moisture content of the oil below 0.2%, heating the oil to 130–150 °C (266–302 °F) and adding salt or citric acid.

=== Virgin oil ===
Virgin coconut oil (VCO) can be produced from fresh coconut milk, meat, or residue. Producing it from the fresh meat involves either wet-milling or drying the residue, and using a screw press to extract the oil. VCO can also be extracted from fresh meat by grating and drying it to a moisture content of 10–12%, then using a manual press to extract the oil. Producing it from coconut milk involves grating the coconut and mixing it with water, then squeezing out the oil. The milk can also be fermented for 36–48 hours, the oil removed, and the cream heated to remove any remaining oil. A third option involves using a centrifuge to separate the oil from the other liquids. Coconut oil can also be extracted from the dry residue left over from the production of coconut milk.

A thousand mature coconuts weighing approximately 1,440 kilograms (3,170 pounds) yield around 170 kg (370 lb) of copra from which around 70 litres (15 imp gal) of coconut oil can be extracted.

=== Refined oil ===
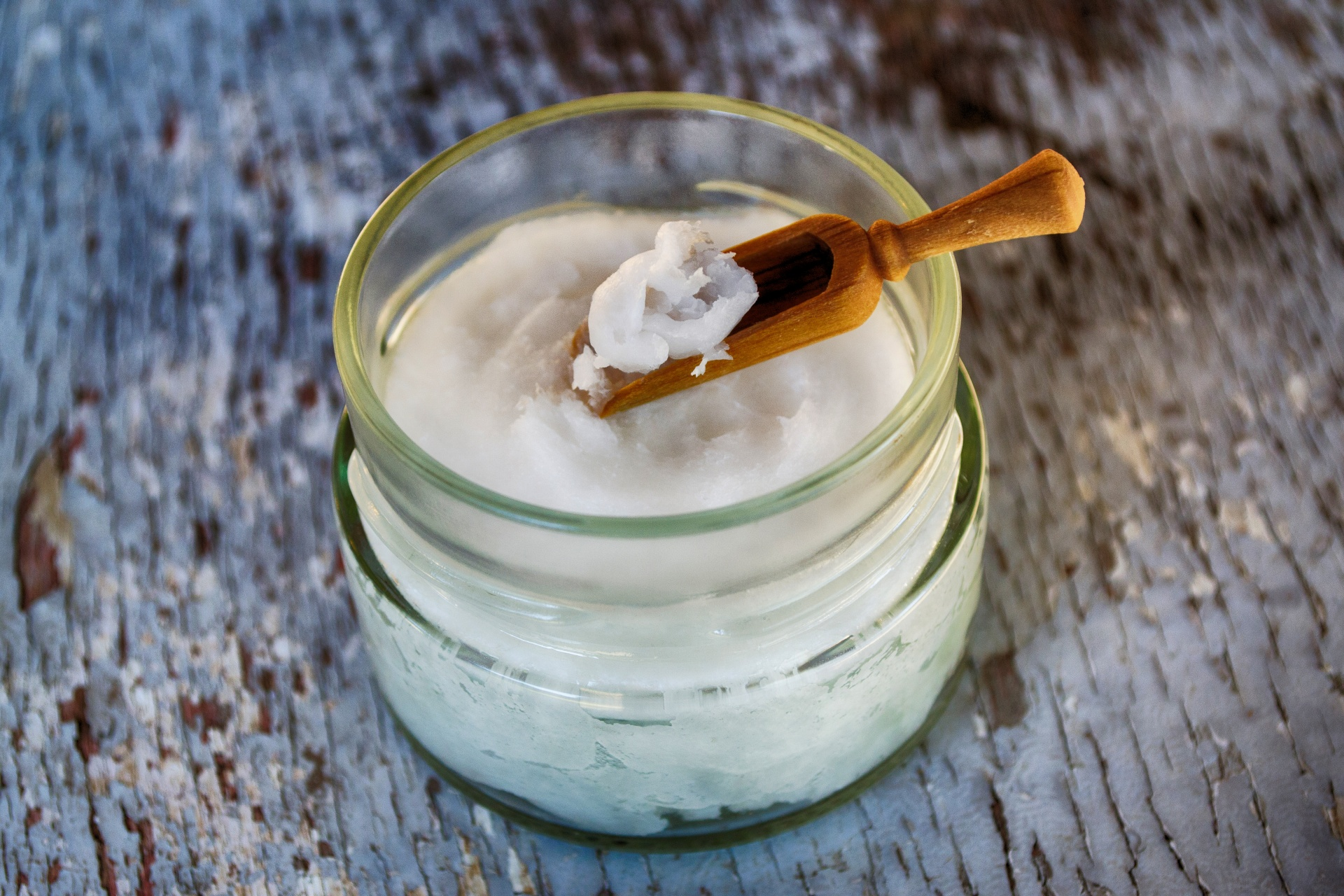
Coconut oil on a wooden spoon

Refined, bleached, and deodorized (RBD) oil is usually made from copra and dried coconut kernels, which are pressed in a heated hydraulic press to extract the oil. This yields practically all the oil present, amounting to more than 60% of the dry weight of the coconut. This crude coconut oil is not suitable for consumption because it contains contaminants and must be refined with further heating and filtering.

Another method for extraction of coconut oil involves the enzymatic action of alpha-amylase, polygalacturonases, and proteases on diluted coconut paste.

Unlike virgin coconut oil, refined coconut oil has no coconut taste or aroma. RBD oil is used for home cooking, commercial food processing, and cosmetic, industrial, and pharmaceutical purposes.

=== Hydrogenation ===
RBD coconut oil can be processed further into partially or fully hydrogenated oil to increase its melting point. Since virgin and RBD coconut oils melt at 24 °C (75 °F), foods containing coconut oil tend to melt in warm climates. A higher melting point is desirable in these warm climates, so the oil is hydrogenated. The melting point of hydrogenated coconut oil is 36–40 °C (97–104 °F).

In the process of hydrogenation, unsaturated fats (monounsaturated and polyunsaturated fatty acids) are combined with hydrogen in a catalytic process to make them more saturated. Coconut oil contains only 6% monounsaturated and 2% polyunsaturated fatty acids. In the partial hydrogenation process, some of these are transformed into trans fatty acids.

=== Fractionation ===
Fractionated coconut oil provides fractions of the whole oil so that its different fatty acids can be separated for specific uses. Lauric acid, a 12-carbon chain fatty acid, is often removed because of its high value for industrial and medical purposes. The fractionation of coconut oil can also be used to isolate caprylic acid and capric acid, which are medium-chain triglycerides, as these are used for medical applications, special diets and cosmetics, sometimes also being used as a carrier oil for fragrances.

=== Standards ===
The World Health Organization's Codex Alimentarius guidelines on food, food production, and food safety, published by the Food and Agriculture Organization, includes standards for commercial partners who produce coconut oil for human consumption.

The Asian and Pacific Coconut Community (APCC), whose 18 members produce about 90 per cent of the coconut sold commercially, has published its standards for virgin coconut oil (VCO), defining virgin coconut oil as obtained from fresh, mature coconut kernels through means that do not "lead to alteration of the oil."

=== Pests ===
Oil quality and production are dependent upon palm cultivation, which is threatened by coconut pests, such as the Oryctes rhinoceros beetles – especially the Asiatic rhinoceros beetle (O. rhinoceros) – and the red palm weevil (Rhynchophorus ferrugineus).

Coconut oil production 2023, tonnes
Philippines	1,212,900
Indonesia	646,000
India	549,000
Vietnam	182,000
Mexico	131,000
World	3,122,675^
Source: FAOSTAT of the United Nations

== Production ==
In 2023, world production of coconut oil was 3.1 million tonnes, led by the Philippines and Indonesia accounting together for 59% of the total.

== Composition and comparison ==
Coconut oil contains only trace amounts of free fatty acids (about 0.03% by mass). Most of the fatty acids are present in the form of esters. In the following content, the expressions "fatty acids" and "acid" below refer to esters rather than carboxylic acids. When forming an ester, the coconut oil is usually referred to as "cocoyl" where the "-yl" root denotes the functional group. For example, the sodium cocoyl isenthionate is a sodium salt of the ester formed by coconut oil and isethionic acid.

The approximate concentration of fatty acids in coconut oil (midpoint of range in source):

Fatty acid content of coconut oil
Type of fatty acid	pct
Lauric saturated C12	48%
Myristic saturated C14	16%
Palmitic saturated C16	9.5%
Capric saturated C10	8%
Caprylic saturated C8	7%
Oleic monounsaturated C18:1	6.5%
Other	5%
black: Saturated; grey: Monounsaturated; blue: Polyunsaturated

The following table provides information about the composition of coconut oil and how it compares with other vegetable oils.

Properties of vegetable oils The nutritional values are expressed as percent (%) by mass of total fat.
Type	Processing treatment	Saturated fatty acids	Monounsaturated fatty acids		Polyunsaturated fatty acids				Smoke point
Type	Processing treatment	Saturated fatty acids	Total	Oleic acid (ω−9)	Total	α-Linolenic acid (ω−3)	Linoleic acid (ω−6)	ω−6:3 ratio	Smoke point
Avocado		11.6	70.6	67.9	13.5	1	12.5	12.5:1	250 °C (482 °F)
Brazil nut		17.6	26.7	26.1	55.7	0.1	55.6	457:1	208 °C (406 °F)
Canola		7.4	63.3	61.8	28.1	9.1	18.6	2:1	204 °C (400 °F)
Coconut		82.5	6.3	6	1.7	0.019	1.68	88:1	175 °C (347 °F)
Corn		12.9	27.6	27.3	54.7	1	58	58:1	232 °C (450 °F)
Cottonseed		25.9	17.8	19	51.9	1	54	54:1	216 °C (420 °F)
Cottonseed	hydrogenated	93.6	1.5		0.6	0.2	0.3	1.5:1	
Flaxseed/linseed		9.0	18.4	18	67.8	53	13	0.2:1	107 °C (225 °F)
Grape seed		9.6	16.1	15.8	69.9	0.10	69.6	very high	216 °C (421 °F)
Hemp seed		7.0	9.0	9.0	82.0	22.0	54.0	2.5:1	166 °C (330 °F)
High-oleic safflower oil		7.5	75.2	75.2	12.8	0	12.8	very high	212 °C (414 °F)
Olive (extra virgin)		13.8	73.0	71.3	10.5	0.7	9.8	14:1	193 °C (380 °F)
Palm		49.3	37.0	40	9.3	0.2	9.1	45.5:1	235 °C (455 °F)
Palm	hydrogenated	88.2	5.7		0				
Peanut		16.2	57.1	55.4	19.9	0.318	19.6	61.6:1	232 °C (450 °F)
Rice bran oil		25	38.4	38.4	36.6	2.2	34.4	15.6:1	232 °C (450 °F)
Sesame		14.2	39.7	39.3	41.7	0.3	41.3	138:1	
Soybean		15.6	22.8	22.6	57.7	7	51	7.3:1	238 °C (460 °F)
Soybean	partially hydrogenated	14.9	43.0	42.5	37.6	2.6	34.9	13.4:1	
Sunflower oil		8.99	63.4	62.9	20.7	0.16	20.5	128:1	227 °C (440 °F)
Walnut oil	unrefined	9.1	22.8	22.2	63.3	10.4	52.9	5:1	160 °C (320 °F)

== Health concerns ==
Many health organizations advise against the consumption of coconut oil owing to its high levels of saturated fat, including the United States Food and Drug Administration, World Health Organization, the British National Health Service, the American Dietetic Association, American Heart Association, British Nutrition Foundation, and Dietitians of Canada.

Marketing of coconut oil has created the inaccurate belief that it is a "healthy food". Instead, studies have found that coconut oil consumption has health effects similar to those of other unhealthy fats, including butter, beef fat, and palm oil.

Coconut oil contains a high amount of lauric acid, a saturated fat that raises total blood cholesterol levels by increasing the amounts of both high-density lipoprotein (HDL) cholesterol and low-density lipoprotein (LDL) cholesterol. Although lauric acid consumption may create a more favorable total blood cholesterol profile, this does not exclude the possibility that persistent consumption of coconut oil may actually increase the risk of cardiovascular diseases through other mechanisms, particularly via the marked increase in total blood cholesterol induced by lauric acid. Because the majority of saturated fat in coconut oil is lauric acid, coconut oil may be preferred over partially hydrogenated vegetable oil when solid fats are used in the diet.

=== Clinical research ===
A 2017 review of clinical research by experts associated with the American Heart Association recommended against consumption of coconut oil due to its propensity for increasing blood levels of LDL as a risk factor for cardiovascular diseases.

A 2020 systematic review and meta-analysis of clinical trials on whether chronic consumption of coconut oil might affect risk factors for cardiovascular diseases found that low-density lipoprotein (LDL) cholesterol (but also high-density lipoprotein (HDL)) concentrations were elevated compared with non-tropical vegetable oils. The review stated that "coconut oil should not be viewed as healthy oil for cardiovascular disease risk reduction, and limiting coconut oil consumption because of its high saturated fat content is warranted."

== Uses ==
Coconut oil
Nutritional value per 100 g
- Energy: 3,730 kJ (890 kcal)
- Fat: 99 g
- Saturated: 82.5 g
- Monounsaturated: 6.3 g
- Polyunsaturated: 1.7 g
Vitamins and minerals
Vitamins	Quantity %DV^{†}
Vitamin E	20% 3 mg
Vitamin K	1% 0.6 μg
Minerals	Quantity %DV^{†}
Iron	0% 0.05 mg
- Other constituents: Quantity
- phytosterols: 86 mg
- Full link to USDA National Nutrient Database
- ^{†}Percentages estimated using US recommendations for adults.

=== Nutrition and fat composition ===
Coconut oil is 99% fat, composed mainly of saturated fats (82% of total; table). In a 100 gram reference amount, coconut oil supplies 890 calories. Half of the saturated fat content of coconut oil is lauric acid (41.8 grams per 100 grams of total composition), while other significant saturated fats are myristic acid (16.7g), palmitic acid (8.6g), and caprylic acid (6.8g). Monounsaturated fats are 6% of total composition, and polyunsaturated fats are 2% (table). Coconut oil contains phytosterols, whereas there are no micronutrients in significant content (table).

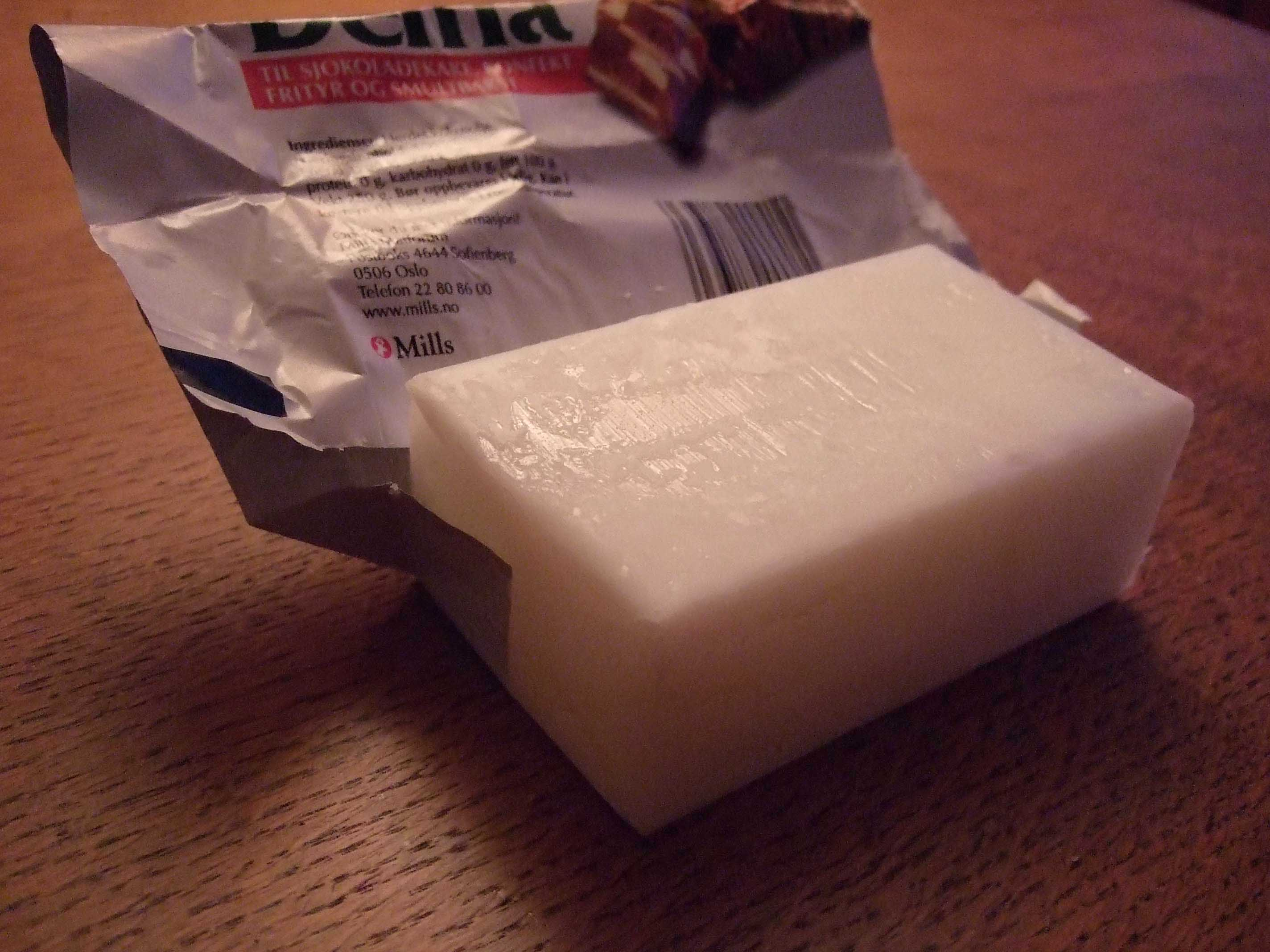
Solid coconut fat

=== In food ===
Coconut oil has a long history in Asia, particularly in tropical regions where the plant is abundant, where it has been used for cooking. It is the oil of choice in Sri Lankan cuisine, where it is used for sautéing and frying, in both savoury and sweet dishes. It also plays a prominent role in the cuisines of Thailand and Kerala.

Coconut oil was introduced relatively recently to most Western cuisines, and is commonly used in baked goods, pastries, and sautés, having a nut-like quality with some sweetness. It is sometimes used by movie theatre chains to pop popcorn.

Other culinary uses include replacing solid fats produced through hydrogenation in baked and confectionery goods. Hydrogenated or partially hydrogenated coconut oil is often used in non-dairy creamers and snack foods. In frying, the smoke point of coconut oil is 177 °C (351 °F).

=== Industry ===
Coconut oil has been tested for use as a feedstock for biodiesel to use as a diesel engine fuel. In this manner, it can be applied to power generators and transport using diesel engines. Since straight coconut oil has a high gelling temperature (22–25 °C (72–77 °F)), a high viscosity, and a minimum combustion chamber temperature of 500 °C (932 °F) (to avoid polymerization of the fuel), coconut oil typically is transesterified to make biodiesel. Use of B100 (100% biodiesel) is possible only in temperate climates, as the gel point is approximately 10 °C (50 °F). The oil must meet the Weihenstephan standard to use pure vegetable oil as a fuel. Moderate to severe damage from carbonisation and clogging would occur in an unmodified engine.

The Philippines, Vanuatu, Samoa, and several other tropical island countries use coconut oil as an alternative fuel source to run automobiles, trucks, and buses, and to power generators. Biodiesel fuel derived from coconut oil is currently used as a fuel for transport in the Philippines. Further research into the potential of coconut oil as a fuel for electricity generation is being carried out in the islands of the Pacific, although to date it appears that it is not useful as a fuel source due to the cost of labour and supply constraints.

Coconut oil has been tested for use as an engine lubricant and as a transformer oil. Coconut oil (and derivatives, such as coconut fatty acid) are used as raw materials in the manufacture of surfactants such as cocamidopropyl betaine, cocamide MEA, and cocamide DEA.

Acids derived from coconut oil can be used as herbicides. Before the advent of electrical lighting, coconut oil was the primary oil used for illumination in India and was exported as cochin oil.

=== Soap ===
Coconut oil is an important base ingredient for the manufacturing of soap. Soap made with coconut oil tends to be hard, though it retains more water than soap made with other oils and thus increases manufacturer yields. It is more soluble in hard water and salt water than other soaps allowing it to lather more easily.

=== Other uses ===
It can be used as fuel for burning in a torch or dripped into fire to create insect-repelling smoke. It also protects metal from corrosion.

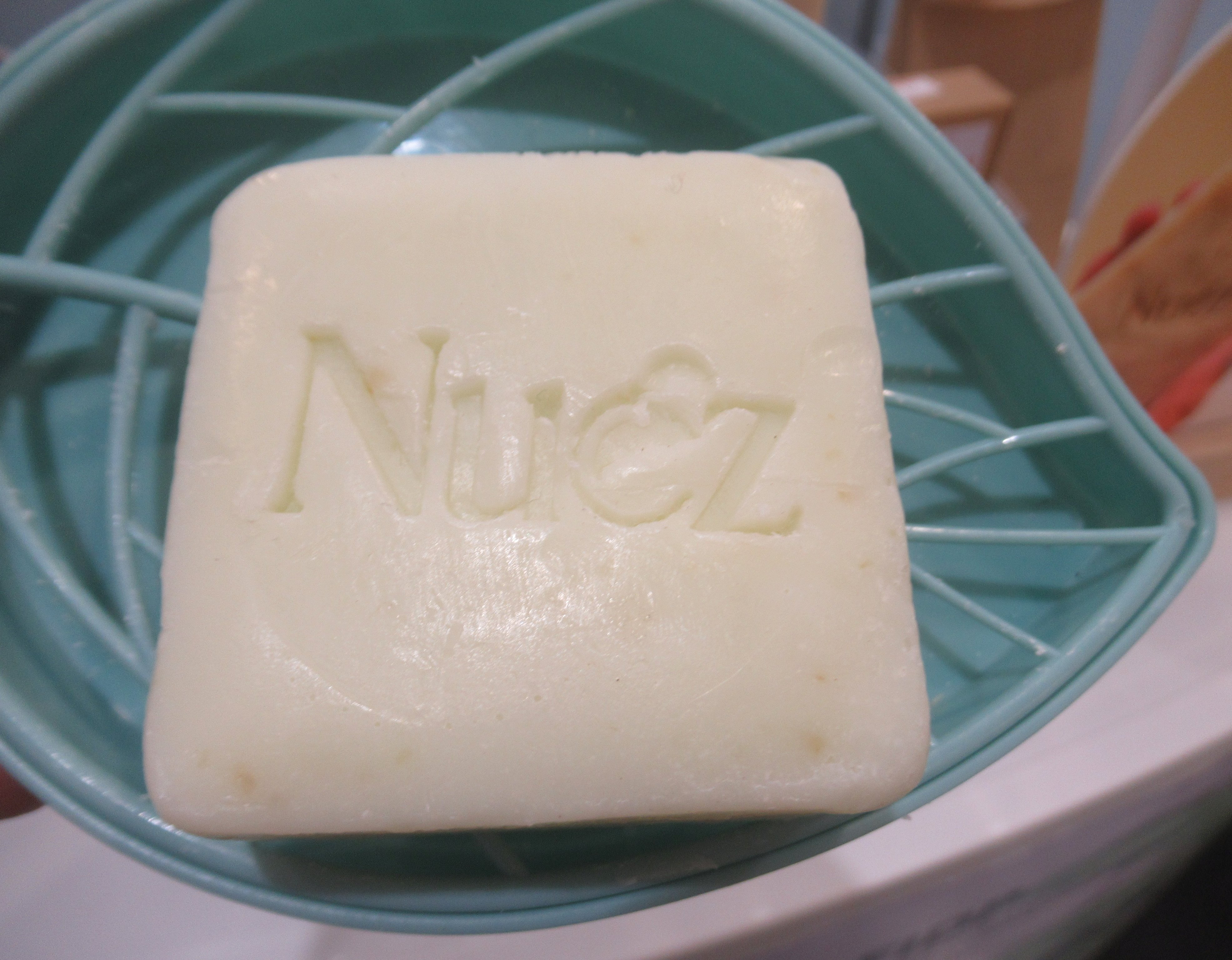
Soap

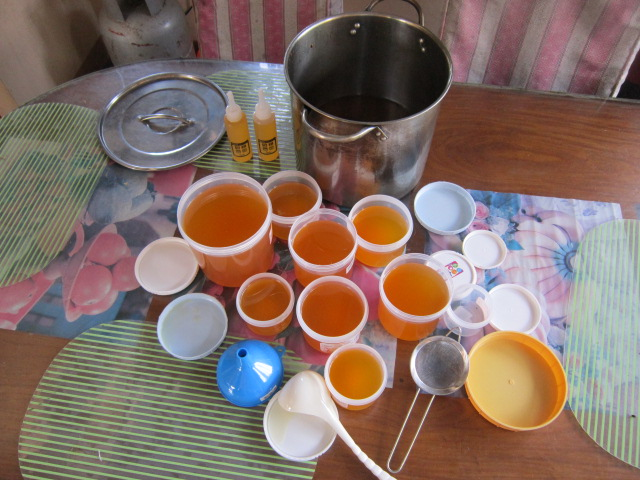
Homemade oil products

== See also ==
- KERAFED
- Saturated fat and cardiovascular disease
- Coconut butter
