= Cocamide DEA =

- Cocoamide diethanolamine

Identifiers
CAS Number	68603-42-9
ChemSpider	none
ECHA InfoCard	100.065.123
EC Number	271-657-0
CompTox Dashboard (EPA)	DTXSID0024842

Properties
Chemical formula	CH_{3}(CH_{2})_{n}C(=O)N(CH_{2}CH_{2}OH)_{2}, n ~ 6-16
Appearance	Yellowish to yellow viscous liquid

Hazards
- GHS labelling
Pictograms	(GHS05: Corrosive) (GHS07: Exclamation mark)
Signal word	Danger
Hazard statements	H315, H318, H319
Precautionary statements	P264, P280, P302+P352, P305+P351+P338, P310, P321, P332+P313, P337+P313, P362
- Except where otherwise noted, data are given for materials in their standard state (at 25 °C [77 °F], 100 kPa). Infobox references

Cocamide DEA, or cocamide diethanolamine, is a diethanolamide made by reacting the mixture of fatty acids from coconut oils with diethanolamine. It is a viscous liquid and is used as a foaming agent in bath products like shampoos and hand soaps, and in cosmetics as an emulsifying agent. See cocamide for the discussion of the lengths of carbon chains in the molecules in the mixture. The chemical formula of individual components is CH_{3}(CH_{2})_{n}C(=O)N(CH_{2}CH_{2}OH)_{2}, where n typically ranges from 8 to 18.

== Safety ==
The International Agency for Research on Cancer (IARC) lists coconut oil diethanolamine condensate (cocamide DEA) as an IARC Group 2B carcinogen, which identifies this chemical as possibly carcinogenic to humans. The listing is based on a dermal animal bioassay.

In June 2012, the California Office of Environmental Health Hazard Assessment added cocamide DEA to the California Proposition 65 (1986) list of chemicals known to cause cancer.

Cocamide DEA has a high irritation potential.

== See also ==
- Cocamide
- Cocamide MEA
- List of cosmetic ingredients
