= Cocamidopropyl hydroxysultaine =

- n = 6, 8, 10, 12, 14, 16

Names
- Other names N,N-Dimethyl-N-(3-cocamidopropyl)-3-ammonio-2-hydroxypropylsulfonate

Identifiers
CAS Number	68139-30-0
EC Number	268-761-3
UNII	62V75NI93W
- Except where otherwise noted, data are given for materials in their standard state (at 25 °C [77 °F], 100 kPa). Infobox references

Cocamidopropyl hydroxysultaine (CAHS) is a synthetic amphoteric surfactant from the hydroxysultaine group. It is found in personal care products (soaps, shampoos, lotions etc.). It has uses as a foam booster, viscosity builder, and an antistatic agent.

== See also ==
- Cocamidopropyl betaine
