= Orthokeratology =

Corrective contact lenses

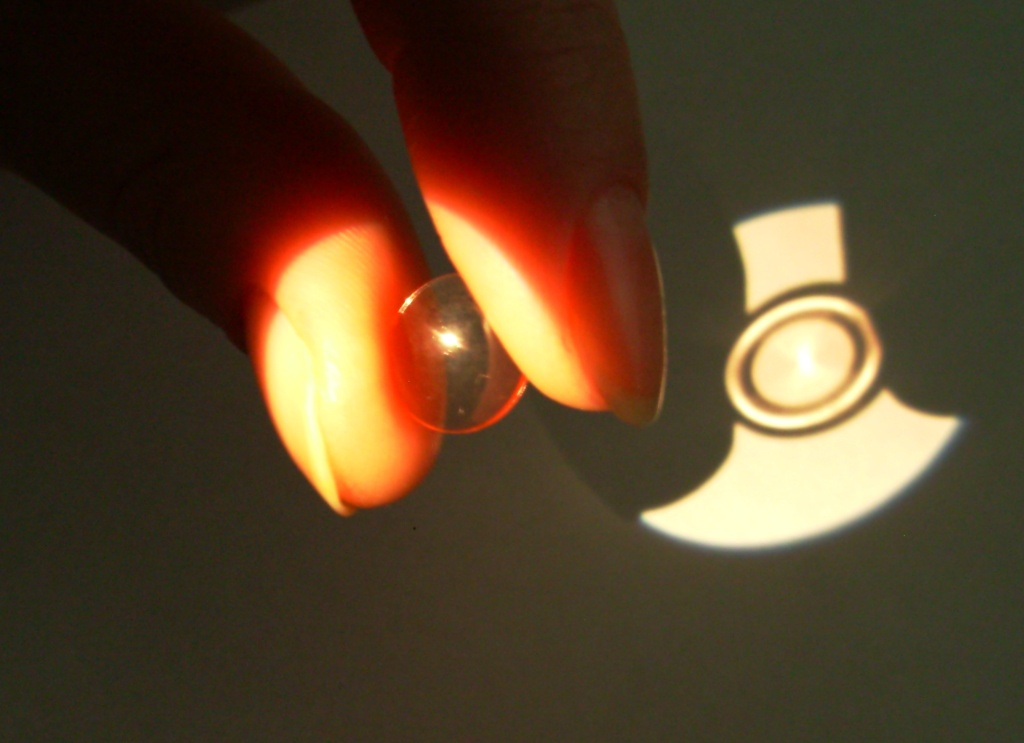
Orthokeratology lens

Orthokeratology, also referred to as Night lenses, Ortho-K, OK, Overnight Vision Correction, Corneal Refractive Therapy (CRT), Accelerated Orthokeretology, Cornea Corrective Contacts, Eccentricity Zero Molding, and Gentle Vision Shaping System (GVSS), is the use of gas-permeable contact lenses that temporarily reshape the cornea to reduce refractive errors such as myopia, hyperopia, and astigmatism.

== History ==
Doctors discovered the reshaping phenomena of glass lenses as early as the 1940s. This history of orthokeratology includes contributions made by multiple authors to the use of contact lenses for myopia reduction.

George Jessen created what was probably the first orthokeratology design in the 1960s made from PMMA material, which he marketed as "Orthofocus". These early designs had generally unpredictable results, leading to the belief that applied orthokeratology was more art or luck than science. Many groups and individuals claim to have been the first to develop modern orthokeratology solutions. However, Dr. Richard Wlodyga, Dr. Philip B. Hanisch and Nick Stoyan, in particular, are generally credited with developing the first reverse zone lens design in the 1980s.

However, it was not until computerized corneal topography became available during the 1990s that it became possible to apply the theory to create designs with repeatable results through being able to accurately map the surface curvature of the cornea using a non-invasive, painless imaging procedure. Additionally, the development of new base materials for rigid gas permeable lenses which provided much higher levels of oxygen permeability opened up the possibility of orthokeratology becoming an overnight procedure rather than being used for daytime wear alone. Finally, the introduction of computer-controlled precision lathes meant that lens designs could be manufactured to sub-micrometer levels of accuracy thereby offering the prospect of high volume production becoming commercially viable.

Nightwear ortho-k solutions were available to consumers in many countries outside the US much earlier than within the US, due to international differences between regulatory controls and bodies. In 1994, the FDA granted the first ever daily wear approval for a lens indicated for Orthokeratology to a type of lens called the Contex OK-Lens. In June 2002, the FDA granted approval for overnight wear of a type of corneal reshaping called "Corneal Refractive Therapy" (CRT), more than fifteen years after Europe.

=== Professional organizations ===
In the summer of 2000, at an educational meeting of optometrists in Toronto, the Orthokeratology Academy of America (OAA) was formed to support, promote and advance orthokeratology. In parallel, the British Orthokeratology Society (BOKS) was established in the UK with similar objectives to promote orthokeratology as a new procedure to correct myopia. The Orthokeratology Society of Oceania (OSO), formerly known as the Orthokeratology Society of Australia (OSA), is an Australia-based association of orthokeratology optometrists and researchers representing Australia and the South Pacific region.

=== Research into slowing of myopia progression in children ===
In 2006 and 2007, papers presented at the British Contact Lens Association and the Global Orthokeratology Symposium indicated the possibility of orthokeratology slowing or stopping myopic progression. This was found to be effective in children in Hong Kong and is the subject of wider study to verify this data. Multiple other research evidence suggest that the reduction in myopic progression is roughly 50%, comparable to that of 0.01% atropine treatment, with remaining uncertainty regarding possible rebound effect after the Ortho-K use is discontinued.

== Mechanism and use ==
Tissue growth and propagation studies indicate that epithelial cells adjust growth in response to presence of a foreign material. CRT lens proximity to the cells therefore is thought to stimulate cell growth where less RoR proximity coincides with added growth and more proximity coincides with growth repression thereby creating a 'proximal pressure' on the epithelial cells.

Around 60% of the eye's focusing power is provided by the cornea, and this is extremely sensitive to very small changes: 6 μm flattening of corneal thickness (around 5% of the thickness of a human hair) results in 1 diopter of changed vision in myopia. Therefore, a specially shaped lens can be used to lightly press the cornea, causing it gradually to be reshaped to the correct shape for focused vision. The corrective effect lasts up to 72 hours once initially acclimatized, which is long enough to be a practical means of eyesight correction. There is some evidence (see above) that unlike other eyesight correction mechanisms, Ortho-K may also reduce future or ongoing eyesight changes or increased myopia, although this is still being researched.

Risks are comparable to or safer than ordinary contact lenses, since they are typically worn for much shorter periods (6–8 hours rather than daytime or 24/7) and while asleep rather than while active. They also compare favorably to surgical correction since no surgery is involved, corrections to the eye's shape can be handled over time (surgery corrects vision at a single point in time, but post-operative ongoing changes to eyesight will continue to occur during the patient's lifetime), and it is considered generally safe for younger patients. In addition, Ortho-K is broadly not 'new' from a safety viewpoint; contact lens safety generally speaking is considered to be well understood. However it is important, as with all contact lenses, to maintain good cleaning and hygiene discipline.

Rigid lenses are generally considered to be not as comfortable as soft lenses, but Ortho-K is claimed to avoid the feeling during waking hours of the eyelids moving over the lens edges while blinking. When Ortho-K lenses are worn, the eyes are closed for sleep, although the same issues that accompany wearing contact lenses during sleep (rapid eye movements and lower tear production) remain.

=== Adaptation, success rates, and discontinuation ===
The cornea experiences a significant degree of adaptation within hours to days, although full adaptation often requiring 2 – 3 weeks. During this initial period vision may be affected for some people. Once adapted, FDA trials showed over 65% of patients achieved 20/20 eyesight and over 90% achieved 20/40 or better (the typical US requirement for driving without glasses).

The corrective effect is stable but not permanent. Left to itself, the eye will slowly lose its adjusted shape, taking approximately 3 days to return to its former vision. The Ortho-K lenses must therefore be worn regularly so the corrected corneal shape is preserved and maintained. Usually they are worn only for part of the day (typically only when asleep at night); some users may only need to use them one night out of every two or three nights.

== Health considerations ==
=== Indications and counter-indications ===
The US FDA overnight orthokeratology is approved up to -6.00 diopters of myopia and a maximum of 1.75 diopters of astigmatism.

In the United Kingdom, the procedure is offered primarily for myopic correction up to −5.00 diopters and up to −1.50 diopters of astigmatism. Fitting evidence for the leading lens designs indicates that procedures undertaken within these parameters have the highest probability of success. Some patients with higher degrees of myopia are successfully treated by specialist practitioners with "off-label" uses of these same lenses.

In South Africa, Australia and Taiwan, practitioners using the GOV orthokeratology system have achieved successful fits as high as −10.00D of myopia and +5.00D of hyperopia. Not every patient within these parameters will be suitable for the procedure and conditions such as flat or steep corneas may result in the procedure being less successful.

Counter-indications may include:

- Inflammations or infection of the anterior segment of the eye or the cornea
- Disease, injury or abnormality affecting the cornea, conjunctiva or eyelid, or impacting contact lens wear
- Very dry eyes or low eye moisture
- Corneal hypoesthesia (low sensitivity)
- Eye related allergies, including allergies to contact lens solutions

=== Adverse effects ===
During the first month of lens wear when the treatment zone on the surface of the cornea is in the process of becoming fully formed, some users may experience vision issues such as ghosting, double vision, contrast problems and/or starbursting, especially at night. These issues are generally resolved by the end of the first month of lens wear. If these issues persist beyond this initial period, the cause may be due to lack of centration of the lens on the eye and/or overly large pupil size (in light or dark). Resolution may be possible through redesign, material changes, better eye moisture retention (night eye masks, duct blocking, etc.) or other techniques.

Orthokeratology showed few severe side-effects, according to a March 2004 report of a very small sample of cases in China where supply of lenses at that time was not subject to any regulatory regime covering safety and efficacy. More typically, complications can occur due to the patient's failure to follow appropriate hygiene recommendations when handling or cleaning the lenses. One common issue being the use of tap water to rinse (although some systems allow for or suggest the use of "clean" tap water) or store as this may cause unwanted buildup of minerals on the contact as well as other issues. Complications may also be due to relative corneal hypoxia (lack of oxygen) with prolonged or overnight contact lens wear in lenses made from the wrong material. However, the use of high or hyper oxygen-permeable materials as approved by the US Food and Drug Administration (FDA) significantly reduces hypoxia, and these are the materials that are normally used in orthokeratology.

Safety advice applicable to most modes of contact lens wear, also applies to ortho-k night-time lenses. An article in the January 2005 issue of Eye & Contact Lens: Science & Clinical Practice discusses two case reports of children who developed corneal ulcers when fit with Paragon CRT contact lenses, which were worn nightly. Each patient presented with a bacterial corneal ulcer after wearing CRT contact lenses for less than 6 months. In the first patient, Pseudomonas aeruginosa was identified as the causative organism. In the second patient, Haemophilus influenzae was cultured from the ulcer. Both patients were treated with antibiotics, resulting in a rapid resolution of the corneal ulcers and preservation of vision. The writers conclude that "Paragon CRT lenses have been approved for use in patients of all ages. When used in children, these lenses may present unique problems. The absolute incidence of bacterial corneal ulcers in patients with CRT lenses are unknown. Severe caution should be used before prescribing CRT lenses for children and informed consent should include potential sight-threatening corneal ulcers." Although sight threatening corneal ulcers are rare, informed consent should routinely be obtained for all new contact lens wearers, whether worn overnight or not.

The Globe and Mail reported two cases in Canada in which Acanthamoeba infections during ortho-k treatment, possibly related to rinsing the lenses in tap water, led to temporary or permanent blindness.

== Lens types ==
Orthokeratology lenses are made by a number of companies and all use special gas-permeable contact lenses to reshape the cornea. The lens material – and especially its oxygen permeability measured by its 'Dk' rating (the higher the value, the greater the degree of oxygen permeability) – is important for maintaining eye-health during the treatment.

Materials and methods vary globally, as does individual country approval. For example, lenses "Menicon Z Night" are generally used overnight only, but in USA they are also FDA-approved for up to 30-day wear, on a regular GP schedule.

Some practitioners have also designed their own orthokeratology lenses typically by using various software packages which combine corneal topographical data with the practitioners' own knowledge and experience to determine the appropriate lens parameters for individual patient prescriptions. These practitioners are obviously doing so "off-label" since their designs are not approved for safety by the FDA.
