= August Müller =

August Müller or Mueller include:

- August Friedrich Müller (1684–1761), German legal scholar and logician
- August Eberhard Müller (1767–1817), German composer, organist and choir leader
- August Müller (inventor) (1864–1949), German pioneer in the manufacture of contact lenses
- August Müller (orientalist) (1848–1892), German orientalist
- August Müller (ornithologist) (1853–1913), German natural history dealer, entomologist and ornithologist
- August B. Mueller (1905–1996), American politician from Minnesota

== See also ==
- Auguste Müller (1847-1930), a German folk carver
