= Effects of long-term contact lens wear on the cornea =

Long-term contact lens use can lead to alterations in corneal thickness, stromal thickness, curvature, corneal sensitivity, cell density, and epithelial oxygen uptake. Other structural changes may include the formation of epithelial vacuoles and microcysts (containing cellular debris), corneal neovascularization, as well as the emergence of polymegethism in the corneal endothelium. Functional changes from long-term contact lens use include decreased corneal sensitivity, vision loss, and photophobia. Many contact lens-induced changes in corneal structure are reversible if contact lenses are not used for an extended period of time.

Knowledge about the form and function of the cornea and the various types of contact lenses and their common complications is important to understanding this article.

== Changes in function and morphology ==
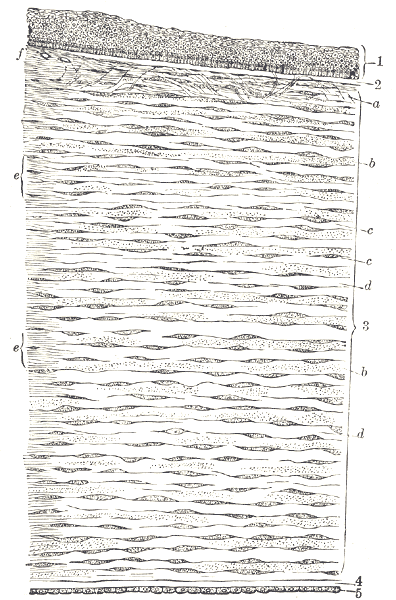
Layers of the Cornea (1) Epithelium (2) Anterior elastic lamina (3) Substantia propria (4) Posterior elastic lamina (5) Endothelium of the anterior chamber

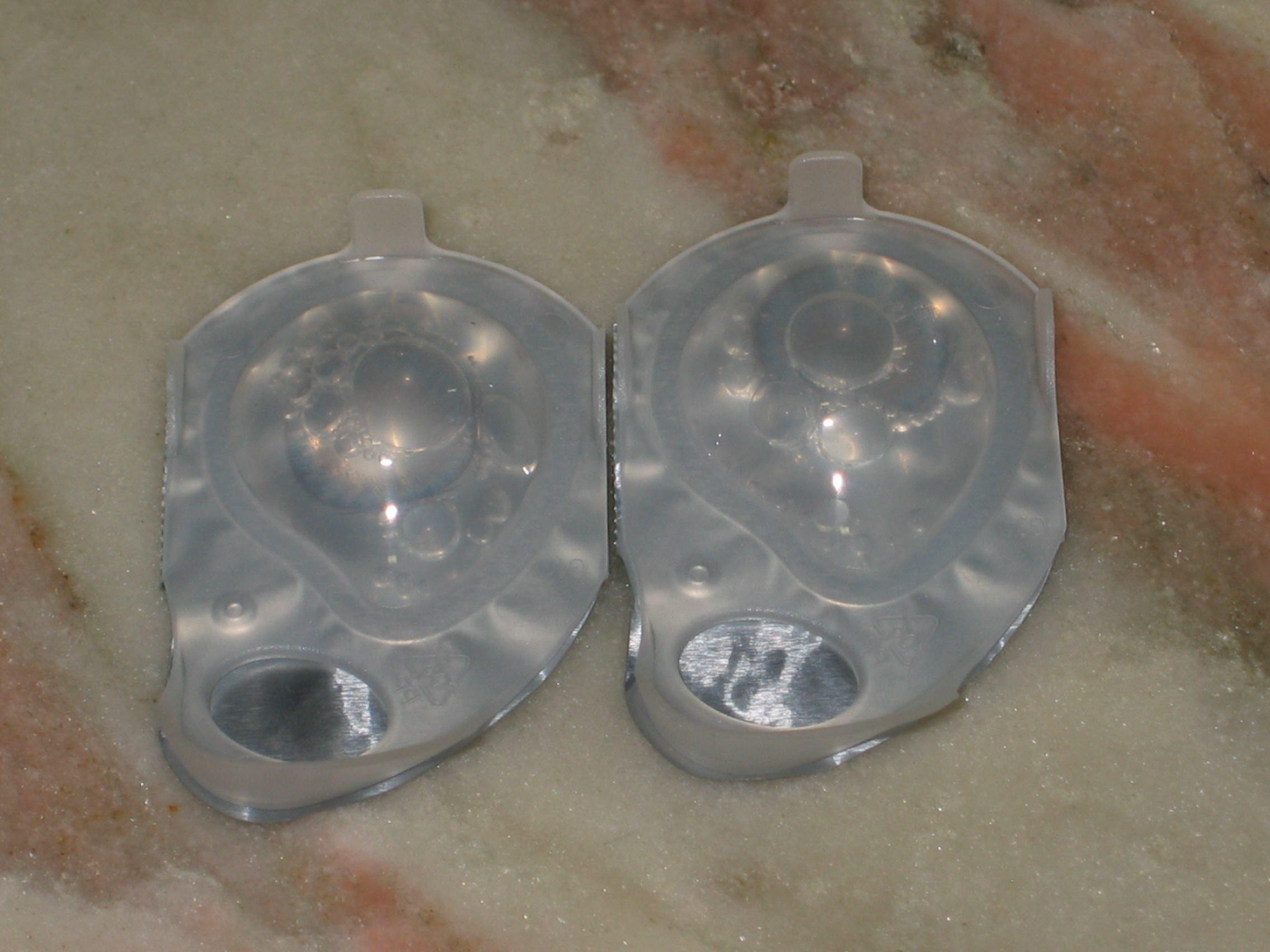
Disposable, soft contact lenses.

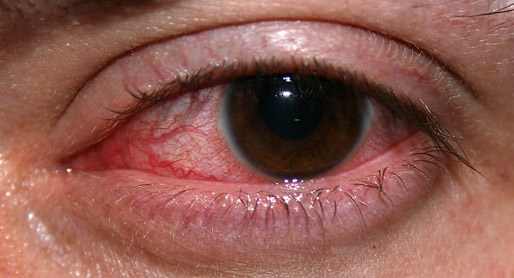
Keratitis, or an inflammation of the cornea

The effects of extended contact lens wear on the cornea have been studied extensively and are well-documented. When determining the effects of long-term contact lens use on the cornea, many studies do not differentiate between users of hard and soft contact lenses, while studies that have made this differentiation have found similar results. This is probably because most contact lens-induced changes to the cornea are caused by hypoxia, which occurs as long as any physical barrier to the surface of the cornea is present. In certain instances, hard contact lenses were shown to cause the same changes in corneal structure as soft contact lenses, though these changes were more dramatic because rigid lenses are capable of inflicting greater trauma on the eyes.

== Structural change ==
Long-term use of soft hydrogel contact lenses has been shown to alter the following in the cornea: epithelial oxygen uptake, epithelial thickness, stromal thickness, and corneal endothelial morphology. Furthermore, the formation of epithelial vacuoles and microcysts has been observed following long-term contact lens wear. Vacuoles are fluid-filled chambers that begin to appear one week after extended contact lens use begins; their number increases over time with extended contact lens wear. Microcysts tend to appear three months after contact lens wear begins and increase in number over time as long as contact lens wear resumes. On average, over five times as many epithelial microcysts than normal have been observed in long-term contact lens wearers. The hypoxic environment the cornea experiences when hydrogel contact lenses are worn is conducive to forming microcysts and vacuoles, most likely due to suppression of corneal endothelium metabolism.

Among patients who have worn soft hydrogel contact lenses for over a year, significant reductions in epithelial oxygen uptake, epithelial thickness, and stromal thickness have been recorded, while an increase in endothelial polymegethism (the variation in the size of corneal endothelial cells) was found. The cause is unclear, but is thought to be related to chronic corneal hypoxia. In patients who had worn contact lenses for approximately five years or more, a 30 to 50 μm reduction in central and peripheral corneal thickness has been recorded. Furthermore, the reduction was more pronounced in patients wearing hard contact lenses than in patients wearing soft contact lenses. Contact lens-induced hypoxia triggers the cornea to undergo anaerobic respiration, resulting in a buildup of lactic acid that osmotically draws water into corneal cells, causing edema. Two explanations have been proposed for contact lens-induced stromal thinning. It is thought that this edema may inhibit stromal tissue synthesis. Alternatively, the lactic acid buildup may lead to the erosion of stromal tissue.

Increased endothelial polymegethism is also found in long-term wearers of rigid gas permeable lenses as soon as one week after contact lens wear begins. This change is indicated by significant increases in Max/Min cell size ratio in contact lens wearers. The mechanism behind contact lens-induced polymegethism is unknown, though it is also thought to be a byproduct of corneal edema and epithelial hypoxia. Endothelial pleiomorphism is another factor that arises from long-term use of rigid gas permeable lenses; significant decreases in 6-sided cells are noted after one year, accompanied by increased numbers of 7-sided cells.

Increased corneal curvature is yet another change known to arise from long-term contact lens wear; this increase in corneal curvature can be as much as 0.5 diopters greater than normal. This is thought to be caused by corneal thinning-induced ectasia. Corneal surface irregularity and asymmetry are also caused by long-term contact lens wear; these problems are sometimes correlated with astigmatism in contact lens wearers and are thought to be caused by hypoxia, surface molding, and chronic and mild trauma to the cornea from contact lens use.

Long-term use of contact lenses has been associated with an increased risk of corneal neovascularization, an irreversible sight threatening condition in which new blood vessels grow in the avascular cornea as a response to prolonged hypoxia. Contact lenses cause corneal neovascularization because they restrict oxygen diffusion to the corneal epithelium. In the short term, the cornea responds to oxygen deprivation by increasing blood flow to the corneal limbus, the narrow circular border between the cornea and sclera. Over time, this chronic limbal hyperemia can progress to corneal neovascularization.

Modern silicon hydrogel lenses pose very little risk for neovascularization, especially when compared to traditional hydrogel lenses, because they have much higher oxygen transmissibility (between 4 and 6 times higher) compared to older hydrogel formulations. The oxygen transmissibility of contact lenses is measured in units of Dk/t, which is the oxygen permeability of the lens material (Dk) divided by the thickness of the lens (t). The industry standard is to report Dk/t values measuring lens thickness at the center of a -3.00 D lens. The higher a contact lens wearer's prescription is, the thicker their lens is overall, which decreases Dk/t. Minus lenses are thicker away from the center, while plus lenses are thicker at the center, which decreases Dk/t in those zones. Silicon hydrogel lenses were introduced in the late 1990s and their usage has steadily increased. In 2023, they made up almost 75% of all soft daily-wear contact lenses prescribed in a prescribing survey of 20 countries. In fact, silicon hydrogel lenses have largely eliminated both short and long-term side effects of corneal hypoxia, like corneal reddening, edema, and neovascularization, except for contact lens wearers with high prescriptions. Research subjects who wore silicon hydrogel contact lenses on an extended (overnight) basis for 9 months showed no signs of neovascularization, whereas subjects who wore hydrogel contact lenses showed signs of moderate neovascularization after only 3 months of extended wear. Switching to silicon hydrogel lenses from lenses with lower oxygen permeability can cause limbal hyperemia and symptoms of corneal neovascularization to decrease by "emptying" the blood vessels, though they remain in the cornea and can refill under hypoxic conditions or if irritated.

Long-term use of contacts made from polymethylmethacrylate (PMMA), a relatively rigid, oxygen-impermeable material, or thick hydrogel contact lenses have been found to cause corneal warpage (shape distortion). PMMA contacts are rarely prescribed today.

Long-term use of cosmetic contact lenses increases the risk of corneal infection, at least partially due to user habits like improper cleaning, overwearing, sleeping with lenses on, and borrowing others' lenses. However, the physical composition of cosmetic contact lenses themselves also plays a role in increasing the risk of long-term corneal complications. The surface of cosmetic contact lenses are often rougher than their prescription counterparts, and this increases the risk of mechanical trauma to both the inside of the eyelid as well as the cornea. Surface roughness may also facilitate eye secretion buildup, microorganism proliferation, and corneal infection, especially if cosmetic contacts are stored unused in lens solution for prolonged periods.

== Functional change ==
Corneal sensitivity is significantly diminished after extended contact lens wear (five or more years). It is thought that constant adhesion of contact lenses to the cornea may lead to adaptation to mechanical stimuli, thus decreasing corneal sensitivity to tactile stimuli. However, this difference in sensitivity is not correlated with a change in the number of nerve fiber bundles in the subbasal plexus of the cornea. A proposed explanation for the reduced sensitivity is the induced quiescence of free nerve endings following long term corneal exposure to contact lenses.

Long-term use of PMMA or thick hydrogel contact lenses have been found to cause increased eye irritability, photophobia, blurred vision, and persistent haloes.

There is some evidence to show that rigid gas permeable contact lenses are capable of slowing myopic progression after long-term wear. This same effect was not found in patients who had worn soft contact lenses for an extended period of time. Greater corneal steepening was found in patients wearing soft contact lenses than in patients wearing rigid gas permeable contact lenses, suggesting that the latter may slow the progression of myopia by flattening the cornea.

== Unchanged variables ==
The number of corneal keratocytes in the epithelial stroma has not been found to change with long-term contact lens wear. Endothelial cell density also does not change with long-term contact lens wear. No strong relationship has been found between long-term contact lens wear and corneal astigmatism.

== Reversibility of damage ==
Epithelial oxygen uptake has been found to return to normal levels one month after cessation of contact lens wear. Epithelial thickness has been found to return to a normal level as soon as one week following the cessation of contact lens wear. However, endothelial polymegethism does not seem to return to normal levels even long after the cessation of contact lens wear. Even after a six-month period in which contact lenses are not worn, polymegethism seems to remain. Stromal thickness does not return to a normal level even after an entire month in which contact lens wear is halted. The density of microcysts also remains as long as one month after contact lenses are removed, and microcysts do not disappear completely until two to three months after contact lens wear is completely halted.

Reductions in epithelial oxygen uptake and thickness are thought to be caused by long-term contact lens wear-induced hypoxia, which hinders epithelial metabolism and mitosis. Recovery of normal epithelial oxygen uptake can occur if contact lens wear is completely halted for one month. Because long periods of contact lens wear are correlated with extended hypoxia, the resurgence of cellular growth and epithelial metabolism following contact lens removal (and hence, improved oxygen circulation) leads to an initial, increased resurgence of microcysts containing cellular debris. Over time, however, microcysts will disappear if contact lenses are not worn.

Corneal sensitivity has been found to be significantly diminished following long-term contact lens wear. However, this difference in sensitivity is not correlated with a change in the number of nerve fiber bundles in the subbasal plexus of the cornea, suggesting that diminished corneal sensitivity following extended periods of contact lens wear is not caused by a reduction in nerve fiber bundles but possibly a change in functionality. One or two years of hard contact lens wear has not been shown to affect corneal sensitivity, but real changes are observed following five years of hard contact lens wear. However, this significant decrease in corneal sensitivity appears to be reversible. Following cessation of hard contact lens usage, corneal sensitivity has been shown to be fully regained after several months: patients who had worn hard contact lenses for a decade or longer were able to regain normal corneal sensitivity after four months of not wearing contact lenses at all.

Long-term use of PMMA or thick hydrogel contact lenses has been found to cause corneal warpage (shape distortion), increased eye irritability, photophobia, blurred vision, and persistent haloes. Collectively, these symptoms constitute corneal exhaustion syndrome, which is associated with corneal endothelium abnormalities including edema, polymegethism, irregular mosaic, and pigment deposition. Patients with corneal exhaustion syndrome suffer from compromised corneal endothelium resulting from chronic hypoxia and acidosis. These problems can be alleviated by providing a patient with lenses that allow for greater oxygen permeability.

== See also ==
- Contact lenses
- Keratitis
- Cornea
- Fungal contamination of contact lenses
