= List of soft contact lens materials =

Soft contact lenses are one of several types of contact lenses for corrective vision eyewear as prescribed by optometrists and ophthalmologists.

== Background ==
In the US market, soft contact lenses are approved by the US Food and Drug Administration. The American Optometric Association published a contact lens comparison chart called Advantages and Disadvantages of Various Types of Contact Lenses on the differences between them. These include:

- soft contact lenses
- rigid gas-permeable (RGP)
- daily wear
- extended wear
- disposable
- planned replacement contact lenses.

The US Food and Drug Administration (FDA) defines soft contact lenses as:

made of soft, flexible plastics that allow oxygen to pass through to the cornea. Soft contact lenses may be easier to adjust to and are more comfortable than rigid gas permeable lenses. Newer soft lens materials include silicone-hydrogels to provide more oxygen to your eye while you wear your lenses.

=== History ===
The first contact lenses were made of glass, in 1888. Initially the glass was blown but soon lenses were made by being ground to shape. For the first fifty years, glass was the only material used. The lenses were thin, yet reports of injury were rare. In 1938 perspex (polymethylmethacrylate, or PMMA) began to replace glass in contact lens manufacture. PMMA lenses were easier to produce so the production of glass lenses soon ended. Lenses made of PMMA are called hard lenses. Soft contact lenses were first produced in 1961 by Czech chemical engineer Otto Wichterle using polyhydroxyethylmethacrylate (pHEMA), a material that achieved long-term commercial application. Lenses made of polyacrylamide were introduced in 1971.

== Types ==
The FDA classifies soft contact lenses into four groups for the US market. They are also subcategorized into 1st generation, 2nd generation, and 3rd generation lens materials. These 'water-loving' soft contact lens materials are categorized as "Conventional Hydrophilic Material Groups ("-filcon"):

Group	Water Content	Percentage	Ionic/Non-Ionic
I	Low Water Content	(<50%)	Nonionic
II	High Water Content	(>50%)	Nonionic
III	Low Water Content	(<50%)	Ionic
IV	High Water Content	(>50%)	Ionic

Note: Being ionic in pH = 6.0 – 8.0.

The FDA has been considering updating soft contact lens group types and related guidance literature.

== Contact lens polymers ==
The materials that are classified in the 5 FDA groups include the ones listed in the next 5 sections:

FDA classification of soft contact lens materials
FDA lens group	Adopted name	Transmissibility level (Dk x10^{-11})	Water content	Chemical composition
I non-ionic low water content	galyfilcon A	60	47%	–
I non-ionic low water content	lotrafilcon A	140	24%	DMA, siloxane, TRIS
I non-ionic low water content	lotrafilcon B	110	33%	DMA, siloxane, TRIS
I non-ionic low water content	polymacon	7.5	36%	HEMA
I non-ionic low water content	tetrafilcon	9.0	43.5%	HEMA, MMA, NVP
II non-ionic high water content	alphafilcon A	22.9	66%	HEMA, NVP
II non-ionic high water content	hilafilcon A	26.9	70%	HEMA, NVP
II non-ionic high water content	omafilcon A	19.6	62%	HEMA, PC
III ionic low water content	balafilcon A	99	36%	NCVE, NVP, PBVC, TPVC
III ionic low water content	bufilcon A	16.0	45%	DA, HEMA, MAA
IV ionic high water content	etafilcon A	17.0	58%	HEMA, MAA
IV ionic high water content	ocufilcon D	19.7	55%	HEMA, MAA
IV ionic high water content	vifilcon A	16.0	55%	HEMA, MAA, PVP
DA – diacetone acrylamide; DMA – N,N-dimethylacrylamide; HEMA – 2-Hydroxyethyl methacrylate; MAA – methacrylic acid; MMA – methyl methacrylate; NCVE – N-carboxl vinyl ester; NVP – N-vinyl pyrrolidone; PBVC – poly[dimethylsiloxyl] di[silybutanol] bis[vinyl carbamate]; PC – phosphorylcholine; TPVC – tris-(trimethylsiloxysilyl) propylvinyl carbamate; TRIS – tris-(hydroxylmethyl) aminomethane

=== Hydrogel groups ===
Below is a list of most contact lens materials on the market, their water percentage, their oxygen permeability rating, and manufacturer brands. Note that the higher the oxygen transmissibility rating, the more oxygen gets to the eye.

==== Low-water nonionic ====
Material	% Water	Oxygen Transmissibility (Dk/t)	Brands
Tefilcon	38	8.9	Cibasoft, Illusions, Torisoft, Softint, STD, LL Bifocal
Tetrafilcon A	43	9	Cooper Clear, Cooper Toric, Preference, Preference Toric, Vantage, Vantage Accents, Vantage Thin, Vantage Thin Accents
Crofilcon	38	13	CSI, CSI Toric
Helfilcon A/B	45	12	Continental Toric, Flexlens, Flexlens Toric, Flexlens Aphakic, Optima Toric, All X-Cel lenses
Mafilcon	33	4	Menicon
Polymacon	38.6	8.5–24.3	Allvue, Biomedics 38, Clearview, CustomEyes 38, EpconSOFT, EsstechPS, Esstech PSD, Esstech SV, Frequency 38, HD, HD-T, HDX, HDX-T, Horizon 38, Hydron Mini, Hydron Zero 4 SofBlue, Hydron Zero 6 SofBlue, Hydron Versa Scribe, Lifestyle MV2, Ideal Soft, Lifestyle Xtra, Lifestyle 4Vue, Lifestyle Toric Bifocal, LL38, Metrosoft ll Multifocal, Metrosoft Toric, Natural Touch, Occasions, Optima 38/SP, PS-45 Multifocal, Simulvue 38, Sof-form II, SofLens, SofLens38, SofLens Multi-Focal, Softics, SoftView, Unilens 38, Westhin Toric, EZvue Soft Contact Lens, Solotica
Hioxifilcon B	49	15	Alden HP Sphere, Alden HP Toric, Aquaease, Essential Soft Toric Multifocal, Flexlens, Quattro, Satureyes, Satureyes Toric and Multifocal, All X-Cel Lenses

==== High-water nonionic ====
Material	% Water	Oxygen Transmissibility (Dk/t)	Brands
Surfilcon A	74	35	
Lidofilcon A	70	31	ActiFresh 400, CV 70
Lidofilcon B	79	38	
Netrafilcon A	65	34.5	
Hefilcon B	45	10	Optima Toric
Alphafilcon A	66	32	SofLens Toric for Astigmatism
Omafilcon A	58–60	28–36.7	Proclear 1-Day, Proclear EP, Proclear 1 day Multifocal, Proclear Multifocal Toric, Biomedics XC, Aveo
Omafilcon B	62	21.3–52.3	Proclear Sphere, Proclear toric, Proclear toric XR, Proclear multifocal, Proclear multifocal XR, Proclear multifocal toric
Vasurfilcon A	74	39.1	Precision UV
Hioxifilcon A	59	28	Alden HP Sphere, Alden HP Toric, ExtremeH₂O 59% Thin/Extra, Biocurve Gold Sphere and Toric, Aura ADM, Scout by Warby Parker, Hydro by Hubble, Miru 1 Day, iWear slim, Atrea Select 1 day
Hioxifilcon D	54	21	Alden HP Sphere, Alden HP Toric, ExtremeH₂O 54%, Clarity H₂0, C-Vue Advanced Custom Toric
Nelfilcon A	69	26	Focus Dailies, Focus Dailies Toric/Progressive, Dailies AquaComfort Plus, FreshLook One-Day, Synergy, Triton, easyvision Vitrea
Hilafilcon A	70	35	
Hilafilcon B	59	22	SofLens 59, SofLens Daily Disposable, SofLens Daily Disposables for Astigmatism, easyvision Virision daily
Acofilcon A	58	25.5	Flexlens Tricurve Keratoconus
Nesofilcon A	78	42	Biotrue ONEday

==== Low-water ionic ====
Material	% Water	Oxygen Transmissibility (Dk/t)	Brands
Bufilcon A	45	16	Hydrocurve II 45, Soft Mate B
Deltafilcon A	43	10	Amsoft, Amsoft Thin, Comfort Flex, Custom Flex, Metrosoft, Soft Form Toric
Phemfilcon	38	9	Durasoft 2

==== High-water ionic ====
Material	% Water	Oxygen Transmissibility (Dk/t)	Brands
Bufilcon A	55	16	Hydrocurve I, Hydrocurve 3 Toric, Softmate II
Perfilcon A	71	34	Permalens
Etafilcon A	58	23.8–28	Acuvue, Acuvue Bifocal, Acuvue 2, Acuvue 2 Colors, 1-Day Acuvue, 1-Day Acuvue Moist, 1-Day Acuvue Moist for Astigmatism, 1-Day Acuvue Moist Multifocal, 1-Day Acuvue Define, Colornova, Discon, Waldo, Natural Vue, Ocylens
Focofilcon A	55	16	Fre-Flex
Ocufilcon B	52–53	16–24	ClearSight 1-Day, Continental, Ocu-Flex 53
Ocufilcon C	55	16	UCL55, UCL-Pediatric
Ocufilcon D	55	17.8–28.1	Biomedics 55 Premier asphere, Biomedics Toric, ClearSight 1-Day Toric, Horien 1-Day Disposable, Cadence Comfort 1 Day, Flextime One Day, iWear fit, Ocean daily, Optosan One
Ocufilcon E	65	22	Ocuflex 65
Ocufilcon F	60	24.3	Hydrogenics 60 UV
Phemfilcon A	55	16	Durasoft 3, Freshlook, Wildeyes
Methafilcon A	55	17.9-37.6	Biocurve Advanced Aspheric, Biocurve 1-Day, Biocurve Toric & Sphere, C-Vue 1-Day ASV, C-Vue 55, Edge III 55, Elite AC, Elite Daily, Elite AC Toric, Expressions Colors, Flexlens, Frequency 55 Sphere/Multifocal, HD2, HDX2, Horizon 55 Bi-Con, Hubble, Kontur, LL55, New Horizons, Revolution, Sauflon 55, Sof-form 55, Sunsoft Eclipse, Sunsoft Toric, Vertex Sphere, Vertex Toric, Atrea Blue 1 day
Methafilcon B	55	14.5–31.3	Frequency 55 Toric, Hydrasoft Sphere, Hydrasoft Sphere Thin, Hydrasoft Aphakic, Hydrasoft Aphakic Thin, Hydrasoft Toric, Hydrasoft Toric Thin
Vilfilcon A	55	16	Focus 1–2 Week Softcolors, Focus Monthly Softcolors, Focus Toric, Focus Progressives, Soft 55, Soft 55 EW

==== Silicone hydrogel polymers ====
Material	Company	FDA Approval	Replacement cycle	% Water	Oxygen Transmissibility (Dk/t)	Modulus (MPa)	Center Thickness (mm)	Brands
Lotrafilcon A	Alcon	2001	monthly	24	175	1.5	0.08	Air Optix Night & Day Aqua, easyvision monthly aquaeyes
Sifilcon A	Alcon	2004		32	82		0.08	O_{2}Optix Custom
Lotrafilcon B	Alcon	2011	monthly	33	110–138	1.0	0.08	O_{2}Optix, Air Optix for Astigmatism, Air Optix Aqua, Air Optix Aqua Multifocal, Air Optix Colors, Air Optix plus HydraGlyde, Air Optix plus HydraGlyde Multifocal, Air Optix plus HydraGlyde for Astigmatism, Specsavers easyvision Irisian (plus), Oculsoft Oxygen
Verofilcon A	Alcon	2018	daily	51–80 (water gradient)	90-100	0.6	0.09	Precision1, Precision1 for Astigmatism
Lehfilcon A	Alcon	2021	monthly	55–99 (water gradient)	154	0.6	0.08	TOTAL30, TOTAL30 for Astigmatism, TOTAL30 Multifocal
Delefilcon A	Alcon	2023	daily	33–99 (water gradient)	156	0.7	0.09	DAILIES TOTAL1, DAILIES TOTAL1 Multifocal, DAILIES TOTAL1 for Astigmatism
Balafilcon A	Bausch & Lomb	2005	monthly	36	91-130	1.1	0.09	PureVision, PureVision Toric, PureVision Multi-Focal, PureVision2, PureVision2 for Astigmatism, PureVision2 Multi-Focal for Presbyopia
Samfilcon A	Bausch & Lomb	2013	monthly	46	163	0.7	0.07	Bausch & Lomb Ultra, Bausch & Lomb Ultra for Astigmatism, Bausch & Lomb Ultra for Presbyopia, Bausch + Lomb ULTRA Multifocal for Astigmatism, iWear intense
Kalifilcon A	Bausch & Lomb	2023	daily	55	134	0.5	0.08	Bausch & Lomb INFUSE, INFUSE for Astigmatism, INFUSE One-Day Multifocal, Bausch & Lomb ULTRA ONE DAY, Bausch & Lomb ULTRA ONE DAY Multifocal
Comfilcon A	CooperVision	2008	monthly	48	116–160	0.75	0.08	Biofinity, Biofinity toric, Biofinity XR, Biofinity XR toric, Biofinity Energys, Biofinity multifocal, Ascend Premier, Cadence premier, Options premier, Atrea Excellence Plus, Atrea Excellence Pro, iWear oxygen
Riofilcon A	CooperVision		daily	58	93	0.4	0.07	Specsavers easyvision Aquiane
Enfilcon A	CooperVision	2012	monthly	46	100	0.6	0.06	Avaira, Avaira Toric, Specsavers easyvision Monthly Uvicia
Fanfilcon A	CooperVision	2016	monthly	55	90–110	0.6	0.06	Avaira Vitality, Avaira Vitality toric, ascend evolve+, options evolve+, 24H Toric, Atrea Comfort 1 Month, iWear balance plus, easyvision Uvicia Plus
Stenfilcon A	CooperVision	2020	daily	54	80–100	0.4	0.08	MyDay, MyDay toric, MyDay Multifocal, MyDay Energys, Kirkland Signature, Specsavers easyvision Linarial, iWear harmony, Atrea Excellence 1 day, Atrea Excellence Pro 1 day, TrueLens Platinum Daily
Somofilcon A	CooperVision	2020	daily + monthly	56	57–86	0.5	0.07	clariti 1 day, clariti 1 day toric, clariti 1 day multifocal, Live daily disposable, clariti elite, clariti toric, clariti xr toric, clariti multifocal, ascend 1 Day Air, easyvision Umere, easyvision Sential, iWear activ, iWear Vivid, TrueLens Premium Daily, aquaclear airone
Inofilcon A	Interrojo	2026	daily + monthly	45	77-106		0.068	Clalen o2o2 1-Day, Clalen o2o2 1-Day Toric, Clalen o2o2 1-Day Multifocal
Galyfilcon A	Johnson & Johnson	2003	monthly	47	86	0.43	0.07	Acuvue Advance with Hydraclear, Acuvue Advance for Astigmatism
Senofilcon A	Johnson & Johnson	2004	daily + biweekly	38	103–147	0.7	0.07	Acuvue Oasys, Acuvue Oasys for Astigmatism, Acuvue Oasys for Presbyopia, Acuvue Oasys 1-Day, Acuvue Oasys 1-Day for Astigmatism, Acuvue Oasys with Transitions, Acuvue Oasys Max 1-Day, Acuvue Oasys Max 1-Day for Astigmatism, Acuvue Oasys Max 1-Day Multifocal
Narafilcon A	Johnson & Johnson	2007	daily	46	118	0.66	0.085	1-Day Acuvue TruEye (new)
Narafilcon B	Johnson & Johnson	2010	daily	48	55			1-Day Acuvue TruEye (old)
Senofilcon C	Johnson & Johnson	2016	monthly	41	129–147	0.77	0.07	Acuvue Vita, Acuvue Vita for Astigmatism
Asmofilcon A	Menicon	2018	monthly	40	161	0.9	0.08	Miru 1month Menicon, Miru 1month Menicon Toric, Miru 1month Menicon Multifocal, Atrea Excellence 1 Month, iWear connect, easyvision Orba
Midafilcon A	Menicon	2020	daily	56	64	0.36	0.07	Miru 1day UpSide, Miru 1 Day UpSide Toric, Miru 1 Day UpSide Multifocal, Miru 1month Menicon Multifocal Toric, iWear Flex, easyvision Soria
Elastofilcon	SilSoft	1991		0.2	340			SilSoft Aphakic, SilSoft Super Plus
Olifilcon B	Visco Vision	2016	daily	47	120	0.6	0.08	Kits Daily, Everclear Elite, Hubble SkyHy
Olifilcon A	Visco Vision	2019	monthly	47	150	0.6	0.08	Everclear Plus, Everclear Air
Serafilcon A	Alcon	2024	weekly	55	Sphere: 149 Toric: 119	0.6	0.08	Precision 7, Precision 7 for Astigmatism, Lumiere 7, Lumiere 7 for Astigmatism

=== Production generations ===
There are three generations of silicone hydrogel contact lens materials:

	1st Generation	2nd Generation	3rd Generation
Material:	Lotrafilcon A, Balafilcon A	Senofilcon A, Galyfilcon A	Samfilcon A, Comfilcon A, Enfilcon A, Asmofilcon A
Features:	TRIS structures, plasma treated, high modulus	Modified Tanaka monomer, lack of coatings, higher Dk for water content	No TRIS structure, no surface treatments or wetting agents, breaks traditional water-Dk-modulus relationships
