= Drahoslav Lím =

Czech chemist

- Born: September 30, 1925; Zeměchy, Czechoslovakia
- Died: August 22, 2003 (aged 77); San Diego, California, USA
- Education: University of Chemistry and Technology, Prague

Drahoslav Lím (September 30, 1925, in Czechoslovakia – August 22, 2003, in San Diego, California) was a Czech chemist. He invented polyhydroxyethylmethacrylate, the synthetic material used for soft contact lenses (hydrogel).

Lím worked as a member of the team of Otto Wichterle (the inventor of soft contact lenses) and in 1955, he came up with poly(hydroethyl-acrylate), the material later used for the lenses. This work was later published in Nature and was the subject of US patents. During 1970 to 1974 he worked in Palo Alto, California, improving contact lenses materials and technology.

When he returned to Czechoslovakia he was persecuted for political reasons and was not allowed to work in his specialisation. In 1979, he was allowed to emigrate to the United States. There Lím worked on materials for artificial kidneys and continued with research on polymers. He was both a professor at the University of California, San Diego and the de facto founder of the Revlon Materials Research Center. At the latter he led a team of scientists who researched tinting technologies for hydrogel contact lenses, materials for intraocular lenses, and formulations for nail enamel. He was awarded over 150 patents.
