= Louis Girard =

Louis Girard may refer to:

- Louis J. Girard, helped to popularize contact lens fitting
- Louis Dominique Girard (1815–1871), French hydraulic engineer
