= Contact lens =

Lenses placed on the eye's surface

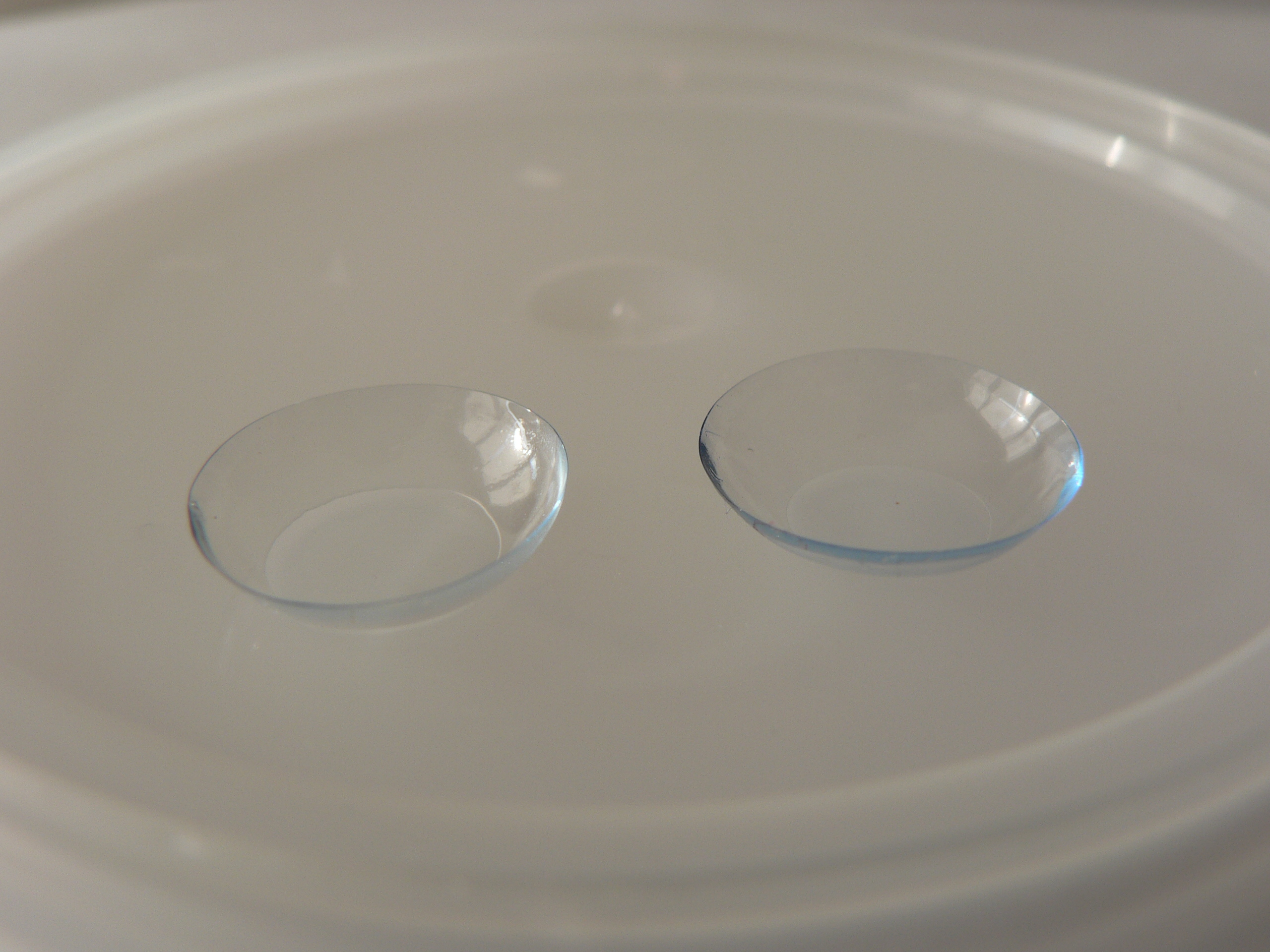
A pair of contact lenses, positioned with the concave side facing upward

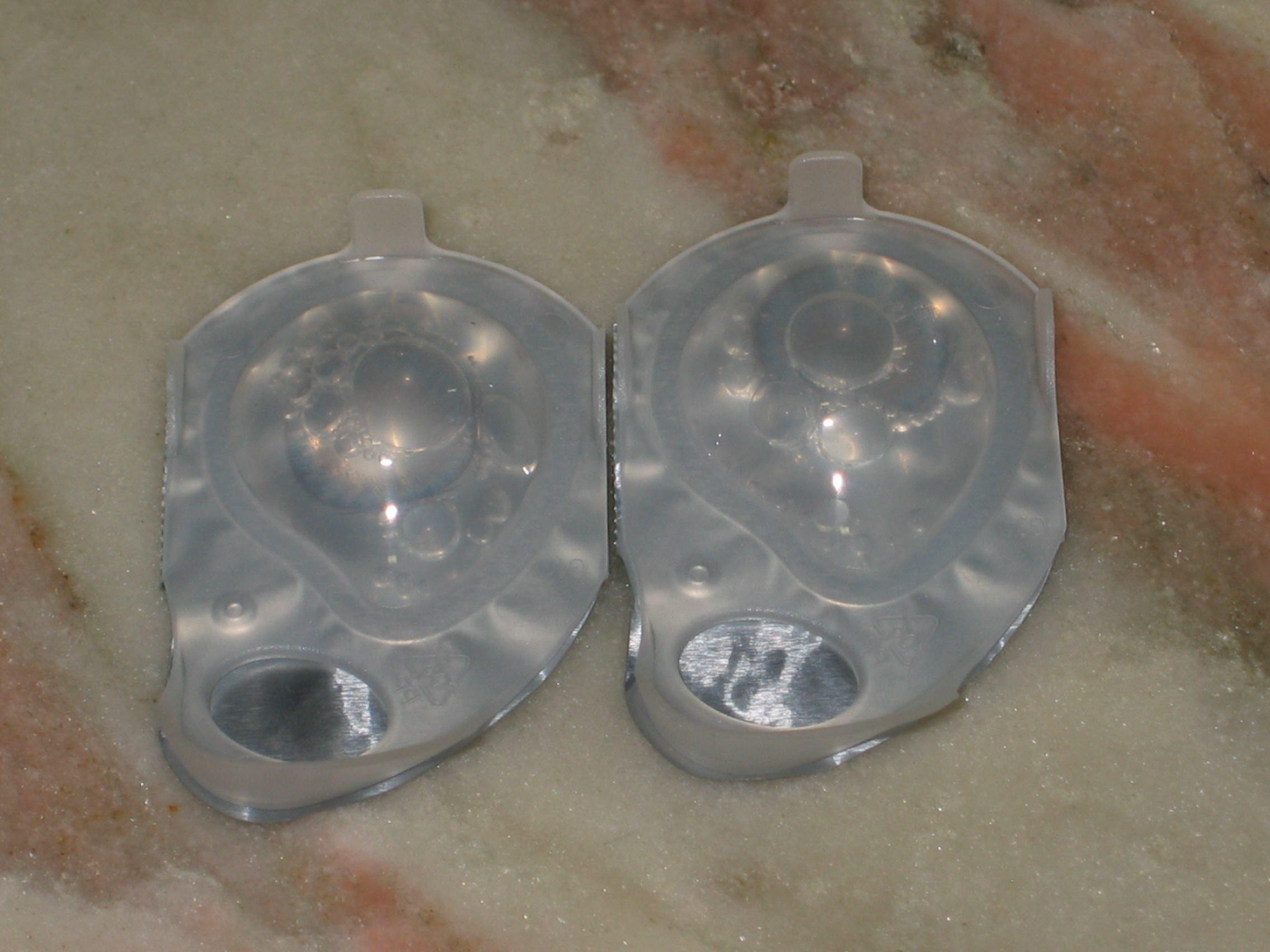
One-day disposable contact lenses with blue handling tint in blister-pack packaging

Contact lenses, or simply contacts, are thin lenses placed directly on the surface of the eyes. Contact lenses are ocular prosthetic devices used by over 150 million people worldwide in 2012, and they can be worn to correct vision or for cosmetic or therapeutic reasons. In 2023, the worldwide market for contact lenses was estimated at $18.6 billion, with North America accounting for the largest share, over 38.18%. Multiple analysts estimated that the global market for contact lenses would reach $33.8 billion by 2030. As of 2010, the average age of contact lens wearers globally was 31 years old, and two-thirds of wearers were female.

People choose to wear contact lenses for many reasons. Aesthetics and cosmetics are main motivating factors for people who want to avoid wearing glasses or to change the appearance or color of their eyes. Others wear contact lenses for functional or optical reasons. Contact lens use is generally more costly than wearing glasses, with annual expenses typically ranging from about US$200 to US$1,000 depending on lens type and replacement schedule. When compared with glasses, contact lenses typically provide better peripheral vision, and do not collect moisture (from rain, snow, condensation, etc.) or perspiration. This can make them preferable for sports and other outdoor activities. Contact lens wearers can also wear sunglasses, goggles, or other eyewear of their choice without having to fit them with prescription lenses or worry about compatibility with glasses. Additionally, there are conditions such as keratoconus and aniseikonia that are typically corrected better with contact lenses than with glasses.

== History ==
=== Origins and first functional prototypes ===
Artist's impression of Leonardo's method for neutralizing the refractive power of the cornea

Leonardo da Vinci is frequently credited with introducing the idea of contact lenses in his 1508 Codex of the eye, Manual D, wherein he described a method of directly altering corneal power by either submerging the head in a bowl of water or wearing a water-filled glass hemisphere over the eye. Neither idea was practically implementable in da Vinci's time. He did not suggest his idea be used for correcting vision; he was more interested in exploring mechanisms of accommodation.

Descartes proposed a device for correcting vision consisting of a liquid-filled glass tube capped with a lens. However, the idea was impracticable, since the device was to be placed in direct contact with the cornea and thus would have made blinking impossible.

In 1801, Thomas Young fashioned a pair of basic contact lenses based on Descartes' model. He used wax to affix water-filled lenses to his eyes, neutralizing their refractive power, which he corrected with another pair of lenses.

John Herschel, in a footnote to the 1845 edition of the Encyclopedia Metropolitana, posed two ideas for the visual correction: the first "a spherical capsule of glass filled with animal jelly", the second "a mould of the cornea" that could be impressed on "some sort of transparent medium". Though Herschel reportedly never tested these ideas, they were later advanced by independent inventors, including Hungarian physician Joseph Dallos, who perfected a method of making molds from living eyes. This enabled the manufacture of lenses that, for the first time, conformed to the actual shape of the eye.

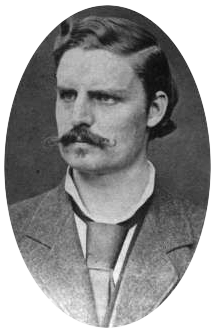
In 1888, Adolf Gaston Eugen Fick was the first to successfully fit contact lenses, which were made from blown glass

Although Louis J. Girard invented a scleral contact lens in 1887, it was French-German ophthalmologist Adolf Gaston Eugen Fick who in 1888 fabricated the first successful afocal scleral contact lens. Approximately 18–21 mm (0.71–0.83 in) in diameter, the heavy blown-glass shells rested on the less sensitive rim of tissue surrounding the cornea and floated on a dextrose solution. He experimented with fitting the lenses initially on rabbits, then on himself, and lastly on a small group of volunteers, publishing his work, "Contactbrille", in the March 1888 edition of Archiv für Augenheilkunde. Large and unwieldy, Fick's lens could be worn only for a couple of hours at a time. August Müller of Kiel, Germany, corrected his own severe myopia with a more convenient blown-glass scleral contact lens of his own manufacture in 1888.

The development of polymethyl methacrylate (PMMA) in the 1930s paved the way for the manufacture of plastic scleral lenses. In 1936, optometrist William Feinbloom introduced a hybrid lens composed of glass and plastic, and in 1937 it was reported that some 3,000 Americans were already wearing contact lenses. In 1939, Hungarian ophthalmologist Dr. István Györffy produced the first fully plastic contact lens. The following year, German optometrist Heinrich Wöhlk produced his own version of plastic lenses based on experiments performed during the 1930s.

=== Corneal and rigid lenses (1949–1960s) ===
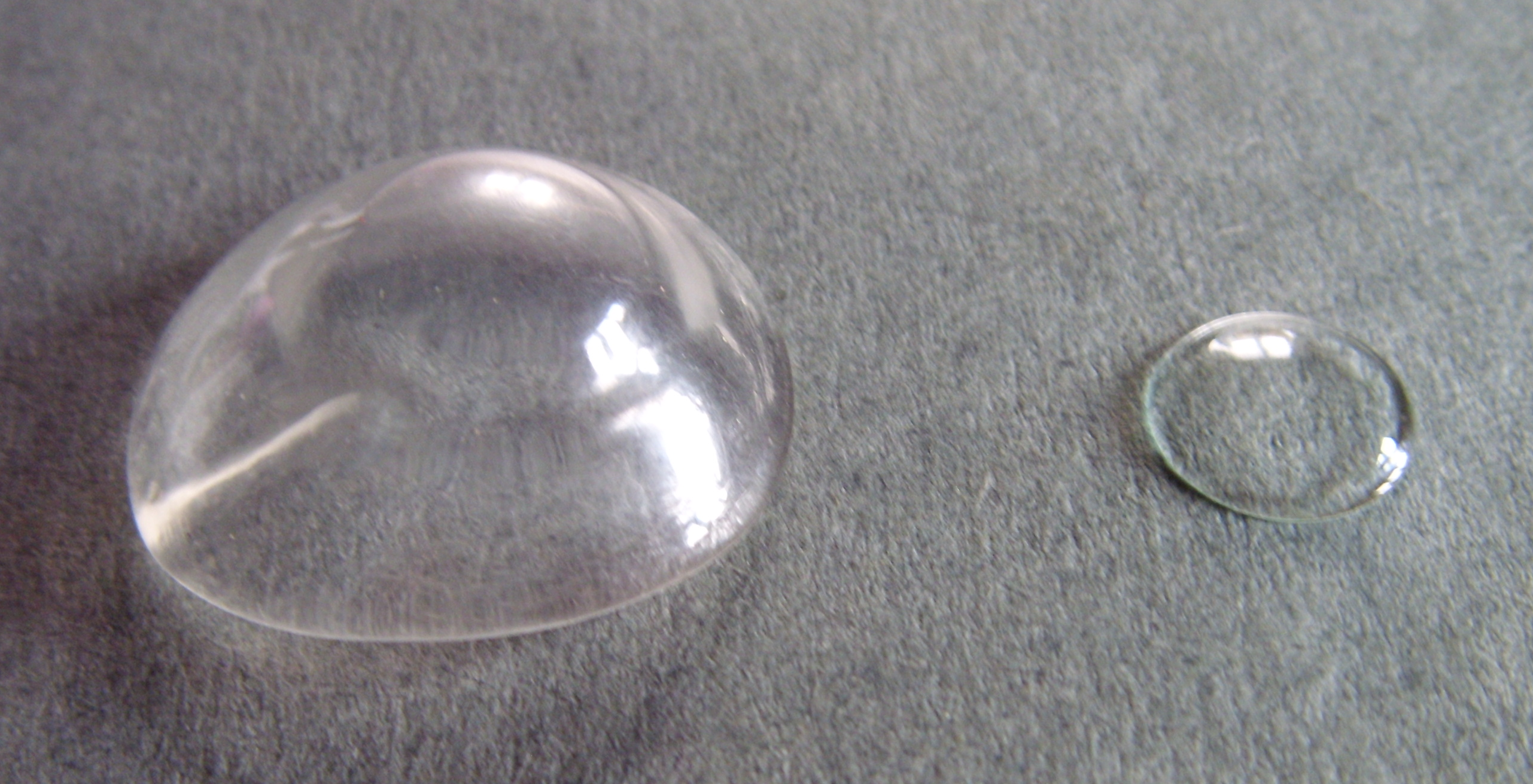
Contact lenses from 1950s (left) and 1990s

In postwar America, the option of contacts began entering the general public consciousness; yet concerns over the effect of foreign materials directly touching the ocular surface remained. In 1949, the first "corneal" lenses were developed. These were much smaller than the original scleral lenses, as they sat only on the cornea rather than across all of the visible ocular surface and could be worn up to 16 hours a day. PMMA corneal lenses became the first contact lenses to have mass appeal through the 1960s, as lens designs became more sophisticated with improving manufacturing technology. On October 18, 1964, in a television studio in Washington, D.C., Lyndon Baines Johnson became the first President in the history of the United States to appear in public wearing contact lenses, under the supervision of Dr. Alan Isen, who developed the first commercially viable soft-contact lenses in the United States.

Early corneal lenses of the 1950s and 1960s were relatively expensive and fragile, resulting in the development of a market for contact lens insurance. Replacement Lens Insurance, Inc. (now known as RLI Corp.) phased out its original flagship product in 1994 after contact lenses became more affordable and easier to replace.

=== Gas permeable and soft lenses (1959–present) ===
One of the major disadvantages of PMMA lenses is that they allow no oxygen to get through to the conjunctiva and cornea, causing a number of adverse and potentially serious clinical effects. By the end of the 1970s and through the 1980s and 1990s, a range of oxygen-permeable but rigid materials were developed to overcome this problem. Chemist Norman Gaylord played a prominent role in the development of these new oxygen-permeable contact lenses. Collectively, these polymers are referred to as rigid gas permeable or RGP materials or lenses. Though all the above contact lens types—sclerals, PMMAs and RGPs—could be correctly referred to as "rigid" or "hard", the latter term is now used for the original PMMAs, which are still occasionally fitted and worn, whereas "rigid" is a generic term for all these lens types; thus, hard lenses (PMMAs) are a subset of rigid contact lenses. Occasionally, the term "gas permeable" is used to describe RGPs, which is somewhat misleading as soft contact lenses are also gas permeable in that they allow oxygen to get through to the ocular surface.

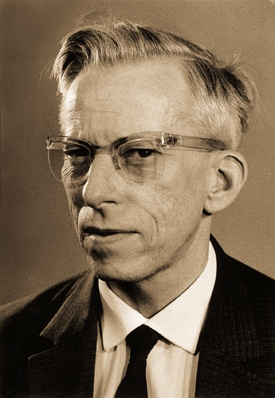
Otto Wichterle (pictured) and Drahoslav Lím introduced modern soft hydrogel lenses in 1959.

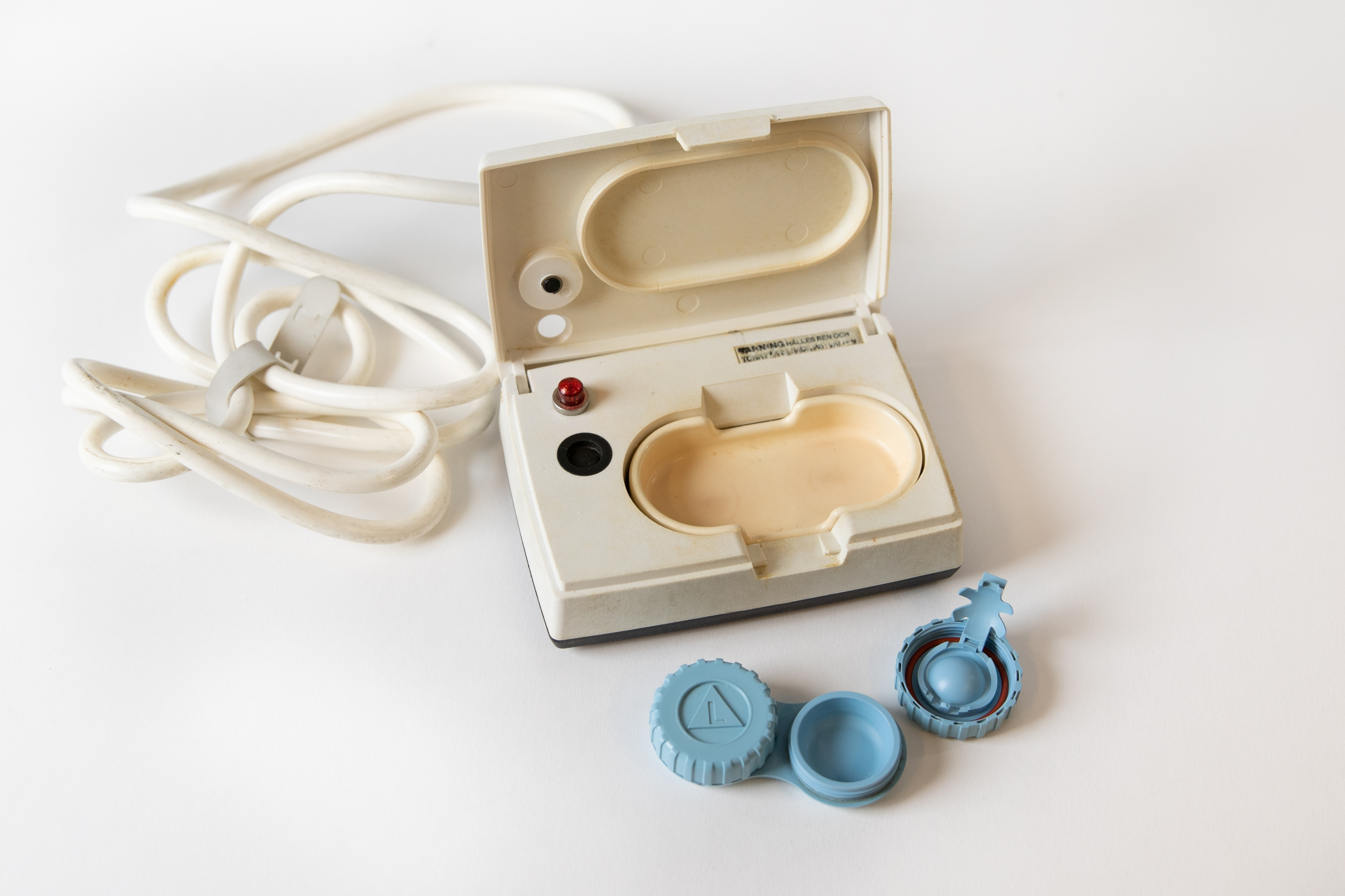
Bausch & Lomb contact lens disinfecting unit (cooker), early 1980s

The principal breakthrough in soft lenses was made by Czech chemists Otto Wichterle and Drahoslav Lím, who published their work "Hydrophilic gels for biological use" in the journal Nature in 1959. In 1965, National Patent Development Corporation (NPDC) bought the American rights to produce the lenses and then sublicensed the rights to Bausch & Lomb, which started to manufacture them in the United States. The Czech scientists' work led to the launch of the first hydrogel contact lenses in some countries in the 1960s and the first approval of the Soflens material by the US Food and Drug Administration (FDA) in 1971. These soft lenses were soon prescribed more often than rigid ones, due to the immediate and much greater comfort (rigid lenses require a period of adaptation before full comfort is achieved). Polymers from which soft lenses are manufactured improved over the next 25 years, primarily in terms of increasing oxygen permeability, by varying the ingredients. In 1972, British optometrist Rishi Agarwal was the first to suggest disposable soft contact lenses.

In 1998, the first silicone hydrogel contact lenses were released by Ciba Vision in Mexico. These new materials encapsulated the benefits of silicone which has extremely high oxygen permeability—with the comfort and clinical performance of the conventional hydrogels that had been used for the previous 30 years. These contact lenses were initially advocated primarily for extended (overnight) wear, although more recently, daily (no overnight) wear silicone hydrogels have been launched.

In a slightly modified molecule, a polar group is added without changing the structure of the silicone hydrogel. This is referred to as the Tanaka monomer because it was invented and patented by Kyoichi Tanaka of Menicon Co. of Japan in 1979. Second-generation silicone hydrogels, such as galyfilcon A (Acuvue Advance, Vistakon) and senofilcon A (Acuvue Oasys, Vistakon), use the Tanaka monomer. Vistakon improved the Tanaka monomer even further and added other molecules, which serve as an internal wetting agent.

Comfilcon A (Biofinity, CooperVision) was the first third-generation polymer. Its patent claims that the material uses two siloxy macromers of diverse sizes that, when used in combination, produce very high oxygen permeability for a given water content. Enfilcon A (Avaira, CooperVision) is another third-generation material that is naturally wet; its water content is 46%.

== Types ==
Contact lenses are classified in diverse ways, namely, by their primary function, material, wear schedule (how long a lens can be worn), and replacement schedule (how long before a lens needs to be discarded).

=== Functions ===
==== Correction of refractive error ====
Corrective contact lenses are designed to improve vision, most commonly by correcting refractive error. This is done by directly focusing light so it enters the eye with the proper power for clear vision.

A spherical contact lens bends light evenly in every direction (horizontally, vertically, etc.). They are typically used to correct myopia and hypermetropia.

There are two ways that contact lenses can correct astigmatism. One way is with toric soft lenses that work essentially the same way as eyeglasses with cylindrical correction; a toric lens has a different focusing power horizontally than vertically, and as a result can correct for astigmatism. Another way is by using a rigid gas permeable lens; since most astigmatism is caused by the shape of the cornea, rigid lenses can improve vision because the front surface of the optical system is the perfectly spherical lens. Both approaches have advantages and drawbacks. Toric lenses must have the proper orientation to correct for astigmatism, so such lenses must have additional design characteristics to prevent them from rotating out of alignment. This can be done by weighting the bottom of the lens or by using other physical characteristics to rotate the lens back into position, but these mechanisms rarely work perfectly, so some misalignment is common and results in somewhat imperfect correction, and blurring of sight after blinking rotates the lens. Toric soft lenses have all the advantages of soft lenses in general, which are low initial cost, ease of fitting, and minimal adjustment period. Rigid gas permeable lenses usually provide superior optical correction but have become less popular relative to soft lenses due to higher initial costs, longer initial adjustment period, and more involved fitting.

==== Correction of presbyopia ====
Correction of presbyopia (a need for a reading prescription different from the prescription needed for distance) presents an additional challenge in the fitting of contact lenses. Two main strategies exist: multifocal lenses and monovision.

Multifocal contact lenses (e.g. bifocals or progressives) are comparable to spectacles with bifocals or progressive lenses because they have multiple focal points. Multifocal contact lenses are typically designed for constant viewing through the center of the lens, but some designs do incorporate a shift in lens position to view through the reading power (similar to bifocal glasses).

Monovision is the use of single-vision lenses (one focal point per lens) to focus an eye (typically the dominant one) for distance vision and the other for near work. The brain then learns to use this setup to see clearly at all distances. A technique called modified monovision uses multifocal lenses and also specializes one eye for distance and the other for near, thus gaining the benefits of both systems. Care is advised for persons with a previous history of strabismus and those with significant phorias, who are at risk of eye misalignment under monovision. Studies have shown no adverse effect to driving performance in adapted monovision contact lens wearers.

Alternatively, a person may simply wear reading glasses over their distance contact lenses.

==== Other types of vision correction ====
For those with certain color deficiencies, a red-tinted "X-Chrom" contact lens may be used. Although such a lens does not restore normal color vision, it allows some color-blind people to distinguish colors better. Red-filtering contact lenses can also be an option for extreme light sensitivity in some visual deficiencies such as achromatopsia.

ChromaGen contact lenses have been used and shown to have some limitations with vision at night although otherwise producing significant improvements in color vision. An earlier study showed very significant improvements in color vision and patient satisfaction.

Later work that used these ChromaGen lenses with people with dyslexia in a randomised, double-blind, placebo-controlled trial showed highly significant improvements in reading ability over reading without the lenses. This system has been granted FDA approval for use in the United States.

Magnification is another area being researched for future contact lens applications. Embedding of telescopic lenses and electronic components suggests that future uses of contact lenses may become extremely diverse.

==== Cosmetic contact lenses ====
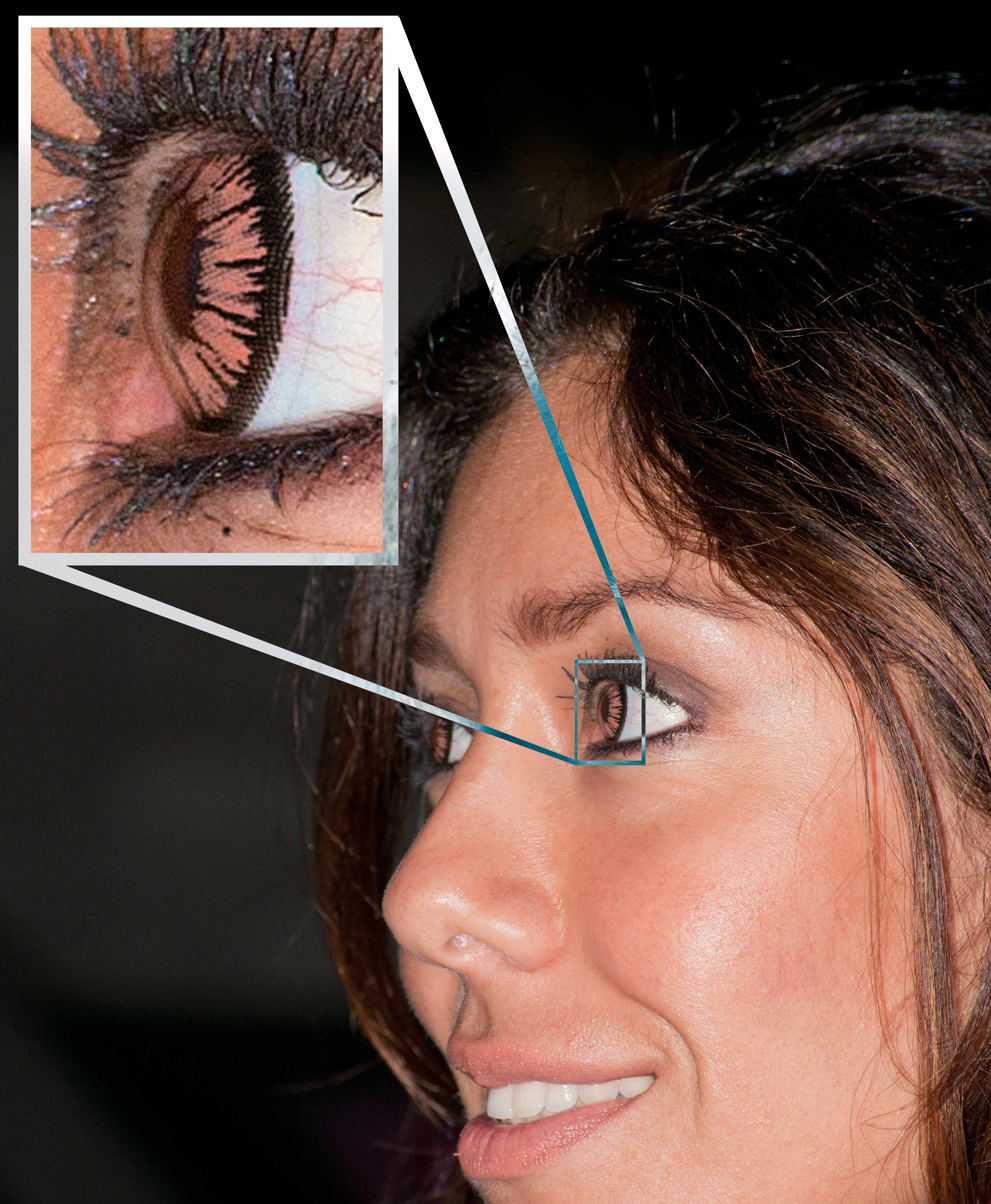
Woman wearing a cosmetic type of contact lens; enlarged detail shows the grain produced during the manufacturing process. Curving of the lines of printed dots suggests these lenses were manufactured by printing onto a flat sheet then shaping it.

A cosmetic contact lens is designed to change the appearance of the eye. These lenses may also correct refractive error. Although many brands of contact lenses are lightly tinted to make them easier to handle, cosmetic lenses worn to change eye color are far less common, accounting for only 3% of contact lens fits in 2004.

In the United States, the FDA labels non-corrective cosmetic contact lenses as "decorative contact lenses". Like any contact lens, cosmetic lenses carry risks of mild to serious complications, including ocular redness, irritation and infection.

Due to their medical nature, colored contact lenses, similar to regular ones, are illegal to purchase in the United States without a valid prescription. Those with perfect vision can buy color contacts for cosmetic reasons, but they still need their eyes to be measured for a "plano" prescription, meaning one with zero vision correction. This is for safety reasons so the lenses will fit the eye without causing irritation or redness.

Some colored contact lenses completely cover the iris, thus dramatically changing eye color. Other colored contact lenses merely tint the iris, highlighting its natural color. A new trend in Japan, South Korea and China is the circle contact lens, which extend the appearance of the iris onto the sclera by having a dark tinted area all around. The result is an appearance of a bigger, wider iris, a look reminiscent of dolls' eyes.

Cosmetic lenses can have more direct medical applications. For example, some contact lenses can restore the appearance and, to some extent the function, of a damaged or missing iris.

==== Therapeutic scleral lenses ====
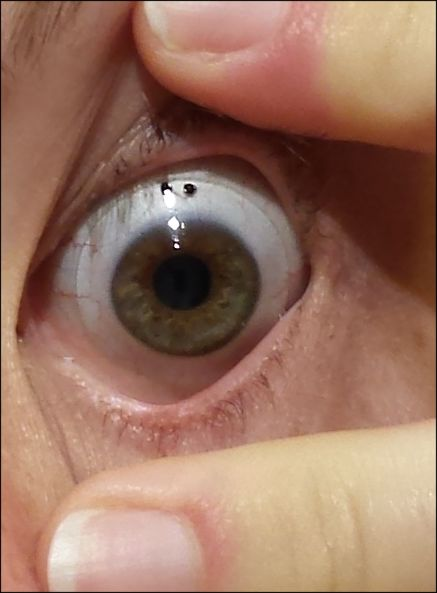
Scleral lens, with visible outer edge resting on the sclera of a patient with severe dry eye syndrome

A scleral lens is a large, firm, transparent, oxygen-permeable contact lens that rests on the sclera and creates a tear-filled vault over the cornea. The cause of this unique positioning is usually relevant to a specific patient whose cornea is too sensitive to support the lens directly. Scleral lenses may be used to improve vision and reduce pain and light sensitivity for people with disorders or injuries to the eye, such as severe dry eye syndrome (keratoconjunctivitis sicca), microphthalmia, keratoconus, corneal ectasia, Stevens–Johnson syndrome, Sjögren's syndrome, aniridia, neurotrophic keratitis (anesthetic corneas), complications post-LASIK, high order aberrations of the eye, complications post-corneal transplant and pellucid degeneration. Injuries to the eye such as surgical complications, distorted corneal implants, as well as chemical and burn injuries also may be treated with scleral lenses.

==== Therapeutic soft lenses ====
Soft lenses are often used in the treatment and management of non-refractive disorders of the eye. A bandage contact lens allows the patient to see while protecting an injured or diseased cornea from the constant rubbing of blinking eyelids, thereby allowing it to heal. They are used in the treatment of conditions including bullous keratopathy, dry eyes, corneal abrasions and erosion, keratitis, corneal edema, descemetocele, corneal ectasia, Mooren's ulcer, anterior corneal dystrophy, and neurotrophic keratoconjunctivitis. Contact lenses that deliver drugs to the eye have also been developed.

=== Materials ===
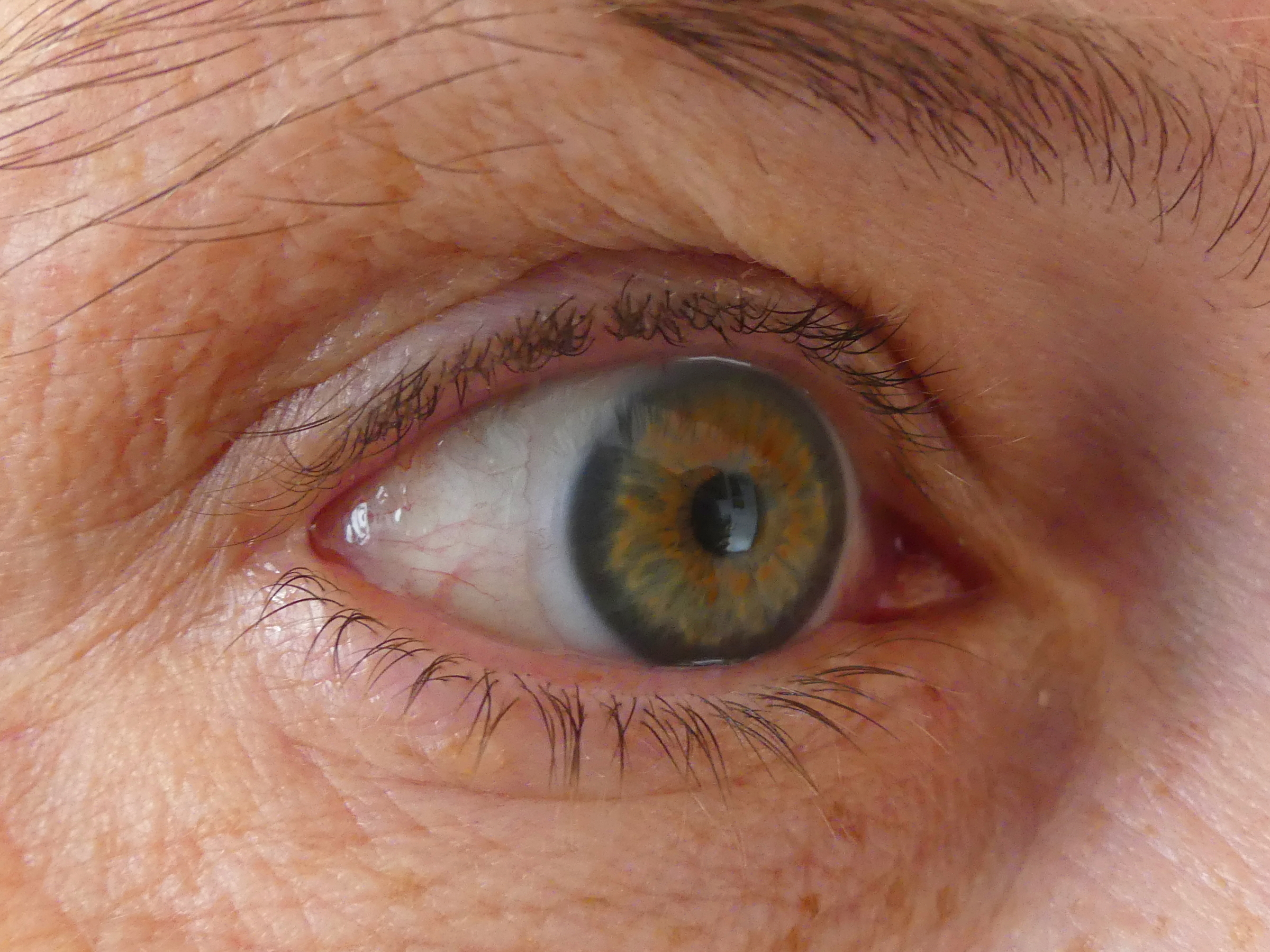
Non-cosmetic contact lenses become almost invisible once inserted in the eye. Most corrective contact lenses come with a light "handling tint" that renders it slightly more visible on the eye, sometimes visible against the sclera.

==== Rigid lenses ====
Glass lenses were never comfortable enough to gain widespread popularity. The first lenses to do so were those made from polymethyl methacrylate (PMMA or Perspex/Plexiglas), now commonly referred to as "hard" lenses. Their main disadvantage is they do not allow oxygen to pass through to the cornea, which can cause a number of adverse, and often serious, clinical events. Starting in the late 1970s, improved rigid materials which were oxygen-permeable were developed. Contact lenses made from these materials are called rigid gas permeable lenses (RGPs).

A rigid lens is able to cover the natural shape of the cornea with a new refracting surface. This means that a spherical rigid contact lens can correct corneal astigmatism. Rigid lenses can also be made as a front-toric, back-toric, or bitoric. Rigid lenses can also correct corneas with irregular geometries, such as those with keratoconus or post surgical ectasias. In most cases, patients with keratoconus see better through rigid lenses than through glasses. Rigid lenses are more chemically inert, allowing them to be worn in more challenging environments where chemical inertia is important compared to soft lenses.

==== Soft lenses ====
Soft lenses are more flexible than rigid lenses and can be gently rolled or folded without damaging the lens. While rigid lenses require a period of adaptation before comfort is achieved, new soft lens wearers typically report lens awareness rather than pain or discomfort.

Hydrogel lenses rely on their water content to transmit oxygen through the lens to the cornea. As a result, higher water content lenses allowed more oxygen to the cornea. In 1998, silicone hydrogel, or Si-hy lenses became available. These materials have both the extremely high oxygen permeability of silicone and the comfort and clinical performance of the conventional hydrogels. Because silicone allows more oxygen permeability than water, oxygen permeability of silicone hydrogels is not tied to the lenses' water content. Lenses have now been developed with so much oxygen permeability that they are approved for overnight wear (extended wear). Lenses approved for daily wear are also available in silicone hydrogel materials.

Current brands of soft lenses are either traditional hydrogel or silicone hydrogel. Because of drastic differences in oxygen permeability, replacement schedule, and other design characteristics, it is very important to follow the instructions of the eye care professional prescribing the lenses. When comparing traditional hydrogel soft lens contacts with silicone hydrogel versions, there is no clear evidence to recommend a superior lens.

Disadvantages of silicone hydrogels are that they are slightly stiffer and the lens surface can be hydrophobic, thus less "wettable" – factors that can influence comfort of lens use. New manufacturing techniques and changes to multipurpose solutions have minimized these effects. Those new techniques are often broken down into 3 generations:

- 1st generation (plasma coating): A surface modification process called plasma coating alters the lens surface's hydrophobic nature;
- 2nd generation (wetting agents): Another technique incorporates internal rewetting agents to make the lens surface hydrophilic;
- 3rd generation (inherently wettable): A third process uses longer backbone polymer chains that results in less cross linking and increased wetting without surface alterations or additive agents.

==== Hybrid ====
A small number of hybrid lenses exist. Typically, these contact lenses consist of a rigid center and a soft "skirt". A similar technique is the "piggybacking" of a smaller, rigid lens on the surface of a larger, soft lens. These techniques are often chosen to give the vision correction benefits of a rigid lens and the comfort of a soft lens.

=== Wear schedule ===
A "daily wear" (DW) contact lens is designed to be worn for one day and removed before sleeping. An "extended wear" (EW) contact lens is designed for continuous overnight wear, typically for up to 6 consecutive nights. Newer materials, such as silicone hydrogels, allow for even longer wear periods of up to 30 consecutive nights; these longer-wear lenses are often referred to as "continuous wear" (CW). EW and CW contact lenses can be worn overnight because of their high oxygen permeability. While awake, the eyes are mostly open, allowing oxygen from the air to dissolve into the tears and pass through the lens to the cornea. While asleep, oxygen is supplied from the blood vessels in the back of the eyelid. A lens hindering passage of oxygen to the cornea causes corneal hypoxia which can result in serious complications, such as corneal ulcer that, if left untreated, can permanently decrease vision. EW and CW contact lenses typically allow for a transfer of 5–6 times more oxygen than conventional softs, allowing the cornea to remain healthy, even with closed eyelids.

Wearing lenses designed for daily wear overnight has an increased risk for corneal infections, corneal ulcers and corneal neovascularization—this latter condition, once it sets in, cannot be reversed and will eventually spoil vision acuity through diminishing corneal transparency. The most common complication of extended wear is giant papillary conjunctivitis (GPC), sometimes associated with a poorly fitting contact lens.

=== Replacement schedule ===
Contact lenses are often categorized by their replacement schedule. Single use lenses (called 1-day or daily disposables) are discarded after one use. Because they do not have to stand up to the wear and tear of repeated uses, these lenses can be made thinner and lighter, greatly improving their comfort. Lenses replaced frequently gather fewer deposits of allergens and germs, making these lenses preferable for patients with ocular allergies or for those who are prone to infection. Single-use lenses are also useful for people who wear contact lenses infrequently, or when losing a lens is likely or not easily replaced (such as when on vacation). They are also considered useful for children because cleaning or disinfecting is not needed, leading to improved compliance.

Other disposable contact lenses are designed for replacement every two or four weeks. Quarterly or annual lenses, which used to be very common, are now much less so. Rigid gas permeable lenses are very durable and may last for several years without the need for replacement. PMMA hards were very durable and were commonly worn for 5 to 10 years but had several drawbacks.

Lenses with different replacement schedules can be made of the same material. Although the materials are alike, differences in the manufacturing processes determine if the resulting lens will be a "daily disposable" or one recommended for two- or four-week replacement. However, sometimes manufacturers use absolutely identical lenses and just repackage them with different labels.

== Manufacturing ==
Molecular structure of silicone hydrogel used in flexible, oxygen-permeable contact lenses.

Typically, soft contact lenses are mass-produced, while rigids are custom-made to exact specifications for the individual patient.

- Spin-cast lenses – A soft lens manufactured by whirling liquid silicone in a revolving mold at high speed.
- Diamond turning – This type is cut and polished on a CNC lathe. The lens starts out as a cylindrical disk held in the jaws of the lathe that is equipped with an industrial-grade diamond as the cutting tool. The CNC lathe may turn at nearly 6000 RPM as the cutter removes the desired amount of material from the inside of the lens. The concave (inner) surface of the lens is then polished with some fine abrasive paste, oil, and a small polyester cotton ball turned at high speeds. To hold the delicate lens in reverse manner, wax is used as an adhesive. The lens' convex (outer) surface is thus cut and polished by the same process. This method can be used to shape rigid as well as soft lenses. In the case of softs, the lens is cut from a dehydrated polymer that is rigid until water is reintroduced.
- Molded – Molding is used to manufacture some brands of soft contact lenses. Rotating molds are used and the molten material is added and shaped by centripetal forces. Injection molding and computer control are also used to create nearly perfect lenses. The lens is kept moist throughout the entire molding process and is never dried and rehydrated.

== Prescriptions ==
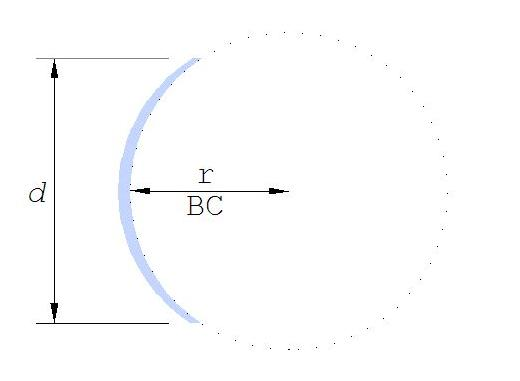
Diameter and base curve radius

The parameters specified in a contact lens prescription may include:

- Brand name
- Material
- Base curve radius (BC, BCR)
- Diameter (D, OAD)
- Optical power in diopters (dpt)
- Center thickness (CT)

Prescriptions for contact lenses and glasses may be similar but are not interchangeable. Prescribing of contact lenses is usually restricted to various combinations of ophthalmologists, optometrists and opticians. An eye examination is needed to determine an individual's suitability for contact lens wear. This typically includes a refraction to determine the proper power of the lens and an assessment of the health of the eye's anterior segment. Many eye diseases inhibit contact lens wear, such as active infections, allergies, and dry eye. Keratometry is especially important in the fitting of rigid lenses.

=== United States ===
Contact lenses are prescribed by ophthalmologists, optometrists, or specially licensed opticians under the supervision of an eye doctor. They are typically ordered at the same office that conducts the eye exam and fitting. The Fairness to Contact Lens Consumers Act guarantees consumers a copy of their contact lens prescription, allowing them to obtain lenses at the provider of their choice.

== Usage ==
Before touching the contact lens or the eye, it is important to wash hands thoroughly with soap and rinse well. Soaps containing moisturizers or allergens should be avoided as these can cause eye irritation. Drying of hands using towels or tissues before handling contact lenses can transfer lint (fluff) to the hands and, subsequently, to the lenses, causing irritation upon insertion. Towels, unless freshly laundered on high temperature wash, are frequently contaminated with large quantities of bacteria and, as such, should be avoided when handling lenses. Dust, lint and other debris may collect on the outside of contact lenses. Again, hand contact with this material, before handling contact lenses, may transfer it to the lenses themselves. Rinsing the case under a source of clean running water, before opening it, can help alleviate this problem. Next the lens should be removed from its case and inspected for defects (e.g. splits, folds, lint). A 'gritty' or rough appearance to the lens surface may indicate that a considerable quantity of proteins, lipids and debris has built up on it and that additional cleaning is required; this is often accompanied and felt by unusually high irritation upon insertion.

Care should be taken to ensure the soft lens is not inserted inside-out. The edge of a lens turned inside out has a different appearance, especially when the lens is slightly folded. Insertion of an inside-out lens for a brief time (less than one minute) should not cause any damage to the eye. Some brands of lenses have markings on the rim that make it easier to tell the front of the lens apart from the back.

=== Insertion ===
Video instructions for inserting and removing contact lenses

Contact lenses are typically inserted into the eye by placing them on the pad of the index or middle finger with the concave side upward and then using that finger to place the lens on the eye. Rigid lenses should be placed directly on the cornea. Soft lenses may be placed on the sclera (white of the eye) and then slid into place. Another finger of the same hand, or a finger of the other hand, is used to keep the eye wide open. Alternatively, the user may close their eyes and then look towards their nose, sliding the lens into place over the cornea. Problems may arise if the lens folds, turns inside-out, slides off the finger prematurely, or adheres more tightly to the finger than the eye surface. A drop of solution may help the lens adhere to the eye.

When the lens first contacts the eye, it should be comfortable. A brief period of irritation may occur, caused by a difference in pH and/or salinity between that of the lens solution and the tear. This discomfort fades quickly as the solution drains away and is replaced by the natural tears. However, if irritation persists, the cause could be a dirty, damaged, or inside-out lens. Removing and inspecting it for damage and proper orientation, and re-cleaning if necessary, should correct the problem. If discomfort continues, the lens should not be worn. In some cases, taking a break from lens wear for a day may correct the problem. In case of severe discomfort, or if it does not resolve by the next day, the person should be seen as soon as possible by an eye doctor to rule out potentially serious complications.

=== Removal ===
Removing contact lenses incorrectly can result in damage to the lens and injury to the eye, so certain precautions must be taken. Rigid contact lenses can best be removed by pulling the eyelid tight and then blinking, whereupon the lens drops out. With one finger on the outer corner of the eyelids, or lateral canthus, the person stretches the eyelids towards the ear; the increased tension of the eyelid margins against the edge of lens allows the blink to break the capillary action that adheres the lens to the eye. The other hand is typically cupped underneath the eye to catch the lens as it drops out. For soft lenses, which have a stronger adherence to the eye surface, this technique is less suitable.

A soft contact lens may be removed by pinching the edge between the thumb and index finger. Moving the lens off the cornea first can improve comfort during removal and reduce risk of scratching the cornea with a fingernail. It is also possible to push or pull a soft lens far enough to the side or bottom of the eyeball to get it to fold then fall out, without pinching and thereby damaging it. If these techniques are used with a rigid lens, it may scratch the cornea.

There are also small tools specifically for removing lenses. Usually made of flexible plastic, they resemble small tweezers, or plungers that suction onto the front of the lens. Typically, these tools are used only with rigid lenses. Extreme care must be exercised when using mechanical tools or fingernails to insert or remove contact lenses.

=== Care ===
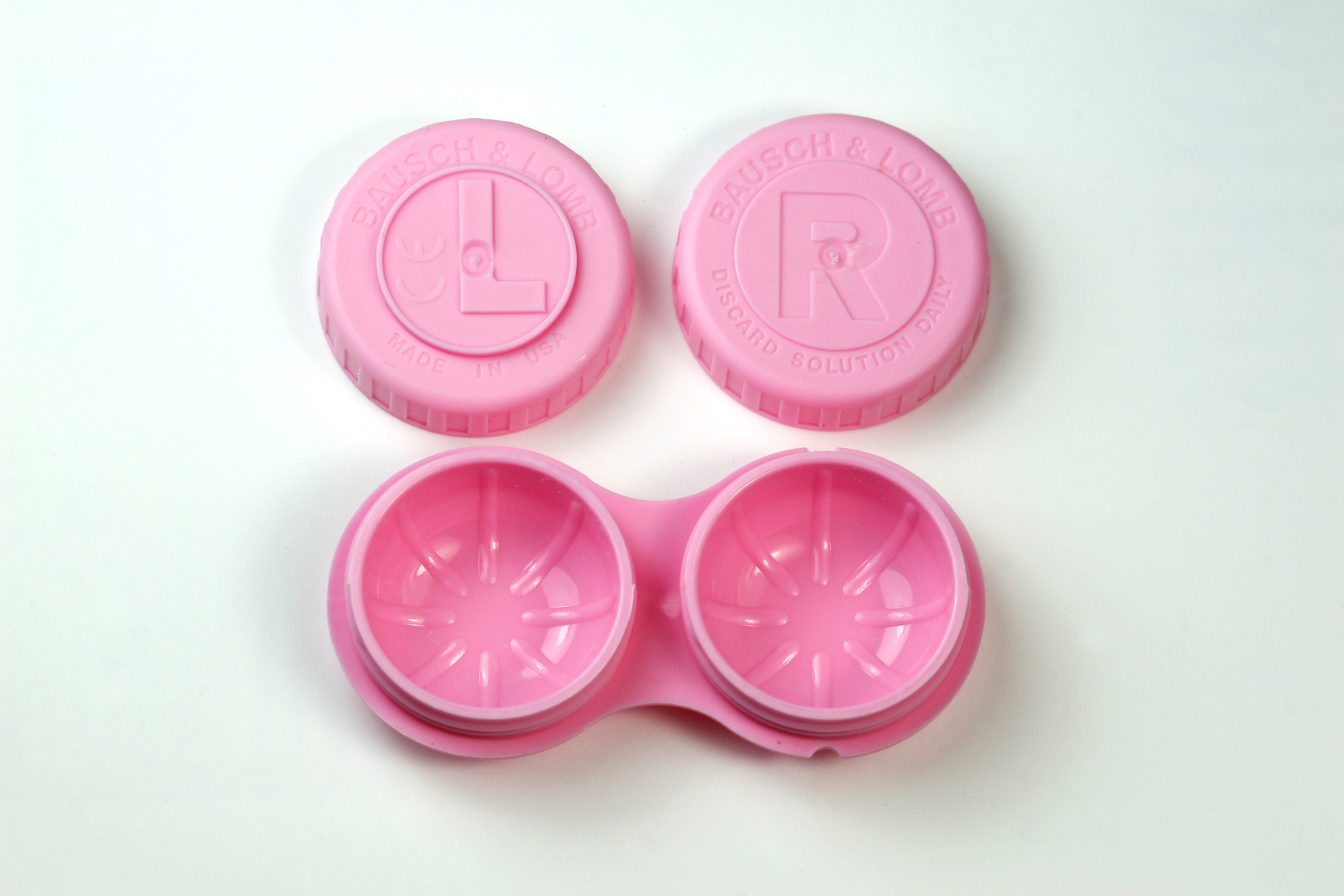
Lens case to store contacts

Lens care varies depending on material and wear schedule. Daily disposables are discarded after a single use and thus require no cleaning. Other lenses need regular cleaning and disinfecting to prevent surface coating and infections.

There are many ways to clean and care for contact lenses, typically called care systems or lens solutions:

Multipurpose solutions
The main attraction of multipurpose solutions is that the same solution can clean, rinse, disinfect and store lenses. Some multipurpose solutions also contain ingredients that improve the surface wettability and comfort of silicone hydrogel lenses. Studies showed that multipurpose solutions are ineffective against Acanthamoebae. There is preliminary research on creating a new multipurpose solution that kills amoeba.

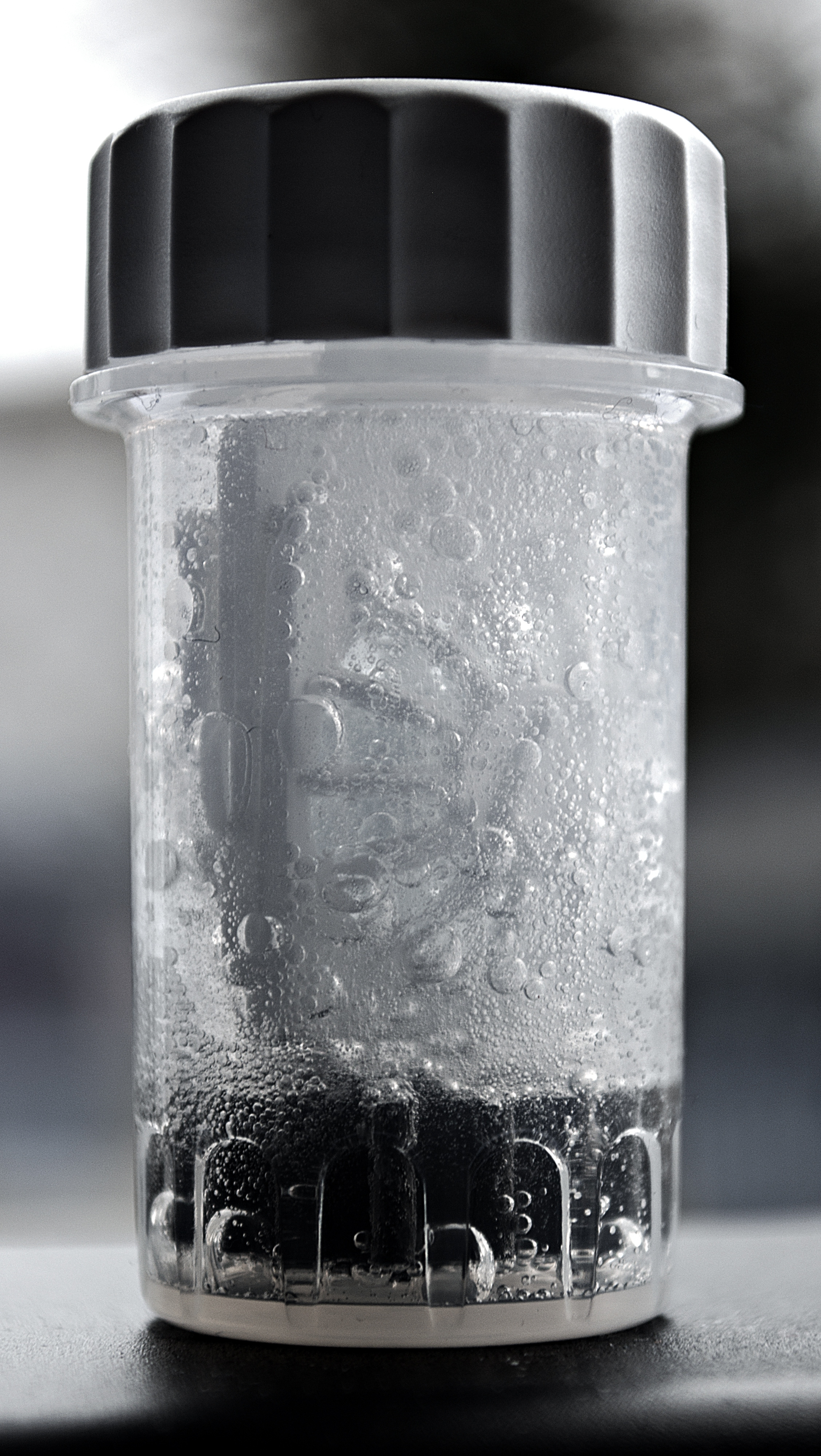
Contact lenses soaking in a hydrogen peroxide-based solution.

Hydrogen peroxide contact solutions
Hydrogen peroxide can be used to disinfect contact lenses. Care should be taken not to get hydrogen peroxide in the eye because it is very painful and irritating. With "two-step" products, the hydrogen peroxide must be rinsed away with saline before the lenses may be worn. "One-step" systems allow the hydrogen peroxide to react completely, becoming pure water. Thus "one-step" hydrogen peroxide systems do not require the lenses to be rinsed before insertion, provided the solution has been given enough time to react.
An exposure time of 2-3 hours to 3% H_{2}O_{2} (non neutralized solution) is sufficient to kill bacteria, HIV, fungi, and Acanthamoeba. This can be achieved by using a "two-step" product or a "one-step" tablet system if the catalytic tablet is not added before 2-3 hours. However, the "one-step" catalytic disk systems are not effective against Acanthamoeba due to insufficient exposure time.
Enzymatic cleaner
Used for cleaning protein deposits off lenses, usually weekly, if the daily cleaner is not sufficient. Typically, this cleaner is in tablet form.
Ultraviolet, vibration, or ultrasonic devices
These devices intend to disinfect and clean contact lenses. The lenses are inserted inside the portable device (running on batteries and/or plug-in) for 2 to 6 minutes during which both the microorganisms and protein build-up are supposed to be cleaned. However these devices can not be used to replace the manual rub and rinse method because vibration and ultrasound can not create relative motion between contact lens and solution, which is required for proper cleaning of the lens. These devices are not usually available in optic retailers but are in other stores.

==== Rub and rinse method ====
Contact lenses can be mechanically cleaned of more substantial protein, lipid and debris build up by rubbing them between the clean pad of a finger and the palm of a hand, using a small amount of cleaning fluid as a lubricant; and by rinsing thereafter. This "rub and rinse" method is thought to be the most effective method for multipurpose solutions, and is the method indicated by the American Academy of Ophthalmology regardless of cleaning solution used. In 2010, the FDA recommended that manufacturers removed the "no rub" from product labeling, "because 'rub-and-rinse' regimens help prevent microbial adhesion to the contact lens, help prevent formation of biofilms, and generally reduce the microbial load on the lens and the lens case."

==== Physical rubbing devices ====
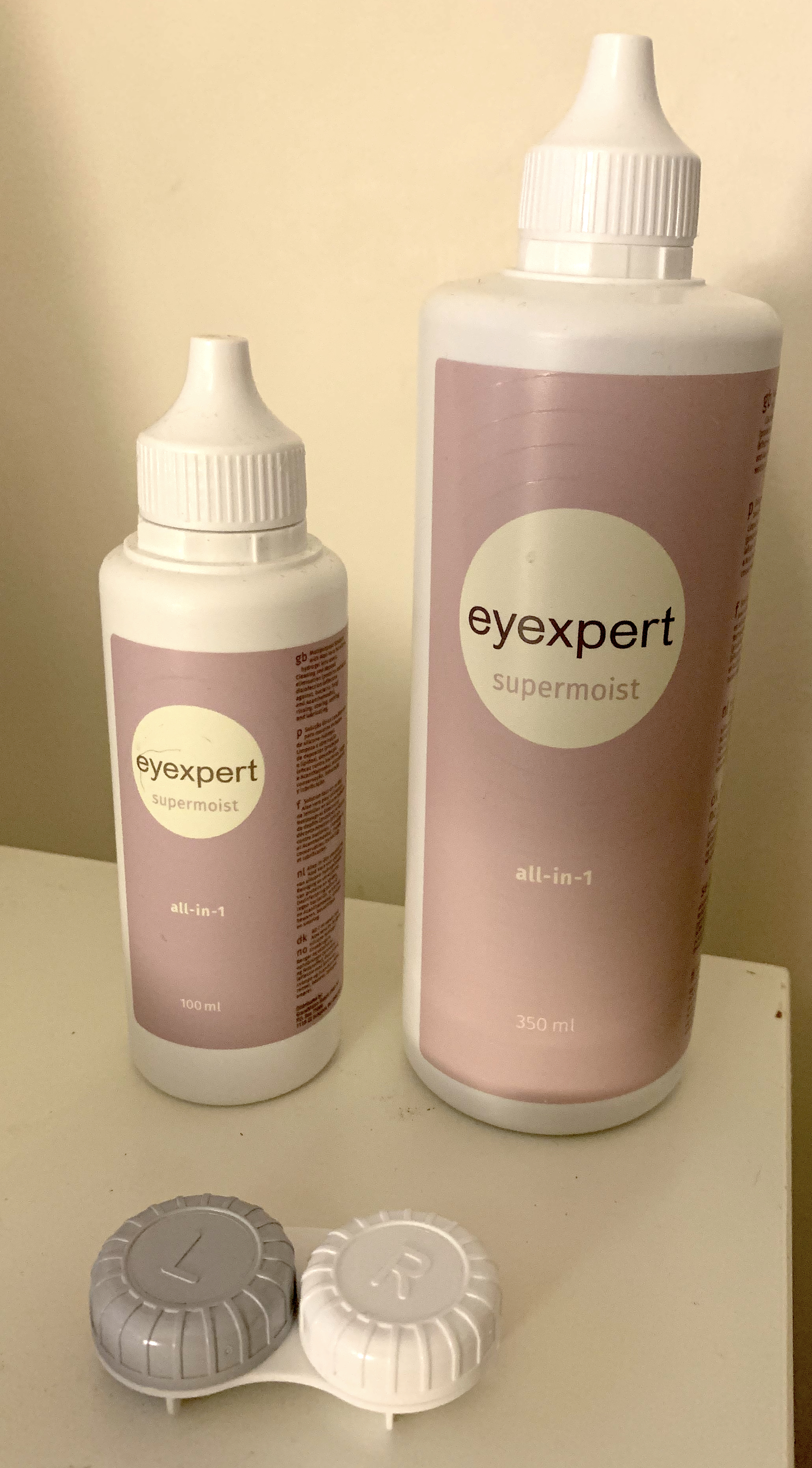
Saline solution bottles together with contact lens cases

This type of devices mimic digital rubbing. The lenses are sandwiched by silicone parts inside the portable device. The device applies a gentle yet high speed rubbing action on the lens surface and remove debris.

Saline solution
Sterile saline is used for rinsing the lens after cleaning and preparing it for insertion. Saline solutions do not disinfect, so it must be used in conjunction with some type of disinfection system. One advantage to saline is that it cannot cause an allergic response, so it is well suited for individuals with sensitive eyes or strong allergies.
Daily cleaner
Used to clean lenses on a daily basis. A few drops of cleaner are applied to the lens while it rests in the palm of the hand; the lens is rubbed for about 20 seconds with a clean fingertip (depending on the product) on each side. Lens must then be rinsed. This system is commonly used to care for rigid lenses.

Water is not recommended for cleaning contact lenses. Insufficiently chlorinated tap water can lead to lens contamination, particularly by Acanthamoeba. On the other hand, sterile water will not kill any contaminants that get in from the environment.

Aside from cleaning the contact lenses, contact lens case should also be kept clean and be replaced at minimum every 3 months.

Contact lens solutions often contain preservatives such as benzalkonium chloride and benzyl alcohol. Preservative-free products usually have shorter shelf lives, but are better suited for individuals with an allergy or sensitivity to a preservative. In the past, thiomersal was used as a preservative. In 1989, thiomersal was responsible for about 10% of problems related to contact lenses. As a result, most products no longer contain thiomersal.

== Complications ==
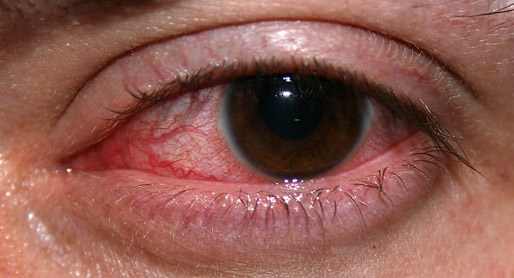
Contact lens acute red eye (CLARE) is a group of inflammatory complications from lens wear

Contact lenses are generally safe as long as they are used correctly. Complications from contact lens wear affect roughly 5% of wearers yearly. Factors leading to eye damage varies, and improper use of a contact lens may affect the eyelid, the conjunctiva, and, most of all, the whole structure of the cornea. Poor lens care may lead to infections by various microorganisms including bacteria, fungi, and the amoeba Acanthamoeba (Acanthamoeba keratitis).

Many complications arise when contact lenses are worn not as prescribed (improper wear schedule or lens replacement). Sleeping in lenses not designed or approved for extended wear is a common cause of complications. Many people go too long before replacing their contacts, wearing lenses designed for 1, 14, or 30 days of wear for multiple months or years. While this does save on the cost of lenses, it risks permanent damage to the eye and even loss of sight.

For non silicone-hydrogel lenses, one of the major factors that causes complications is that the contact lens is an oxygen barrier. The cornea needs a constant supply of oxygen to remain completely transparent and function as it should; it normally gets that oxygen from the surrounding air while awake, and from the blood vessels in the back of the eyelid while asleep. The most prominent risks associated with long-term, chronic low oxygen to the cornea include corneal neovascularization, increased epithelial permeability, bacterial adherence, microcysts, corneal edema, endothelial polymegethism, dry eye and potential increase in myopia. Much of the research into soft and rigid contact lens materials has centered on improving oxygen transmission through the lens.

Silicone-hydrogel lenses available today have effectively eliminated hypoxia for most patients.

Mishandling of contact lenses can also cause problems. Corneal abrasions can increase the chances of infection. When combined with improper cleaning and disinfection of the lens, a risk of infection further increases. Decreased corneal sensitivity after extended contact lens wear may cause a patient to miss some of the earliest symptoms of such complications.

The way contact lenses interact with the natural tear layer is a major factor in determining lens comfort and visual clarity. People with dry eyes are particularly vulnerable to discomfort and episodes of brief blurry vision. Proper lens selection can minimize these effects.

Long-term wear (over five years) of contact lenses may "decrease the entire corneal thickness and increase the corneal curvature and surface irregularity." Long-term wear of rigid contacts is associated with decreased corneal keratocyte density and increased number of epithelial Langerhans cells.

== Current research ==
Contact lens sensors to monitor the ocular temperature have been demonstrated. Monitoring intraocular pressure with contact lens sensors is another area of contact lens research.

A large segment of current contact lens research is directed towards the treatment and prevention of conditions resulting from contact lens contamination and colonization by foreign organisms. Clinicians tend to agree that the most significant complication of contact lens wear is microbial keratitis and that the most predominant microbial pathogen is Pseudomonas aeruginosa. Other organisms are also major causative factors in bacterial keratitis associated with contact lens wear, although their prevalence varies across different locations. These include both the Staphylococcus species (aureus and epidermidis) and the Streptococcus species, among others. Microbial keratitis is a serious focal point of current research due to its potentially devastating effect on the eye, including severe vision loss.

One specific research topic of interest is how microbes such as Pseudomonas aeruginosa invade the eye and cause infection. Although the pathogenesis of microbial keratitis is not well understood, many different factors have been investigated. One group of researchers showed that corneal hypoxia exacerbated Pseudomonas binding to the corneal epithelium, internalization of the microbes, and induction of the inflammatory response. One way to alleviate hypoxia is to increase the amount of oxygen transmitted to the cornea. Although silicone-hydrogel lenses almost eliminate hypoxia in patients due to their very high levels of oxygen transmissibility, they also seem to provide a more efficient platform for bacterial contamination and corneal infiltration than other conventional hydrogel soft contact lenses. One study showed that Pseudomonas aeruginosa and Staphylococcus epidermidis adhere much more strongly to unworn silicone hydrogel contact lenses than conventional hydrogel lenses and that adhesion of Pseudomonas aeruginosa was 20 times stronger than that of Staphylococcus epidermidis. This might partly explain why Pseudomonas infections are the most predominant. However, another study conducted with worn and unworn silicone and conventional hydrogel contact lenses showed that worn silicone contact lenses were less prone to Staphylococcus epidermidis colonization than conventional hydrogel lenses.

Besides bacterial adhesion and cleaning, micro and nano pollutants (biological and manmade) is an area of contact lens research that is growing. Small physical pollutants ranging from nanoplastics to fungi spores to plant pollen adhere to contact lens surfaces in high concentrations. It has been found that multipurpose solution and rubbing with fingers does not significantly clean the lenses. A group of researchers have suggested an alternative cleaning solution, PoPPR (polymer on polymer pollution removal). This cleaning technique takes advantage of a soft and porous polymer to physically peel pollutants off of contact lenses.

Another important area of contact lens research deals with patient compliance. Compliance is a major issue pertaining to the use of contact lenses because patient noncompliance often leads to contamination of the lens, storage case, or both. However, careful users can extend the wear of lenses through proper handling: there is, unfortunately, no disinterested research on the issue of "compliance" or the length of time a user can safely wear a lens beyond its stated use. The introduction of multipurpose solutions and daily disposable lenses have helped to alleviate some of the problems observed from inadequate cleaning but new methods of combating microbial contamination are currently being developed. A silver-impregnated lens case has been developed which helps to eradicate any potentially contaminating microbes that come in contact with the lens case. Additionally, a number of antimicrobial agents are being developed that have been embedded into contact lenses themselves. Lenses with covalently attached selenium molecules have been shown to reduce bacterial colonization without adversely affecting the cornea of a rabbit eye and octyl glucoside used as a lens surfactant significantly decreases bacterial adhesion. These compounds are of particular interest to contact lens manufacturers and prescribing optometrists because they do not require any patient compliance to effectively attenuate the effects of bacterial colonization.

One area of research is in the field of bionic lenses. These are visual displays that include built-in electric circuits and light-emitting diodes and can harvest radio waves for their electric power. Bionic lenses can display information beamed from a mobile device overcoming the small display size problem. The technology involves embedding nano and microscale electronic devices in lenses. These lenses will also need to have an array of microlenses to focus the image so that it appears suspended in front of the wearer's eyes. The lens could also serve as a head-up display for pilots or gamers.

Drug administration through contact lenses is also becoming an area of research. One application is a lens that releases anesthesia to the eye for post-surgery pain relief, especially after PRK (photorefractive keratectomy) in which the healing process takes several days. One experiment shows that silicone contact lenses that contain vitamin E deliver pain medication for up to seven days compared with less than two hours in usual lenses.

Another study of the usage of contact lens is aimed to address the issue of macular degeneration (AMD or age-related macular degeneration). An international collaboration of researchers was able to develop a contact lens that can shift between magnified and normal vision. Previous solutions to AMD included bulky glasses or surgical implants. But the development of this new contact lens, which is made of polymethyl methacrylate, could offer an unobtrusive solution.

== In popular culture ==
=== Films ===
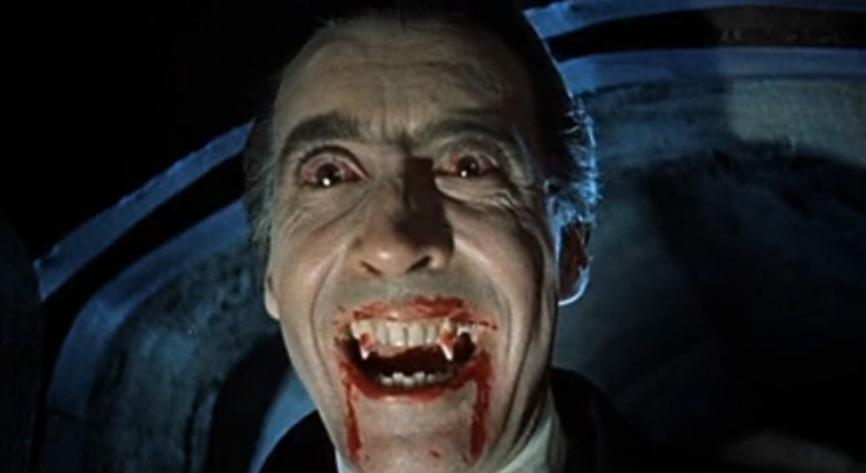
Christopher Lee as the title character in Dracula (1958) in one of the first uses of contact lens with makeup in films

One of the earliest known motion pictures to introduce the use of contact lenses as a make-up artist's device for enhancing the eyes was by the innovative actor Lon Chaney in the 1926 film The Road to Mandalay to create the effect of a character who had a blind eye. Dr. Rueben Greenspoon applied them to Orson Welles for the film Citizen Kane in 1940. In the 1950s, contact lenses were starting to be used in British color horror films. An early example of this is the British actor Christopher Lee as the Dracula character in the 1958 color horror film Dracula, which helped to emphasize his horrific looking black pupils and red bloodshot eyes. Tony Curtis wore them in the 1968 film The Boston Strangler. Contact lenses were also used to better emphasize the sinister gaze of the demonic characters in 1968's Rosemary's Baby and 1973's The Exorcist. Colored custom-made contact lenses are now standard makeup for a number of special effects-based movies.

== See also ==
- Augmented reality contact lens
- Bionic contact lens
- Effects of long-term contact lens wear on the cornea
- Eyeglass prescription
- Fungal contamination of contact lenses
- List of soft contact lens materials
- Visual acuity
