= William Feinbloom =

American optometrist

William Feinbloom (born Brooklyn 1904, died 1985) was an American optometrist considered to be a pioneer in the field of low vision, visual rehabilitation, and the development of low vision devices.

In 1936, he introduced a glass-plastic design contact lens, making them lighter and more convenient than the existing glass-blown lenses.

The Southern California College of Optometry makes an annual award in Feinbloom's name for a student showing outstanding clinical patient care.

The Pennsylvania College of Optometry's clinic, The Eye Institute, operates the William Feinbloom Vision Rehabilitation Center.
