= Oxygen permeability =

Ability of a contact lens to allow oxygen to reach the eye

Oxygen permeability (OP) is a parameter of a contact lens that expresses the ability of the lens to let oxygen reach the eye by diffusion. In soft contact lenses, it is dependent on the thickness of the lens and the material of the lens, especially concerning the water content. Because of this dependence on thickness, transmissibility level (abbreviated Dk/t), the Dk per thickness of the lens, is more commonly used.

The earliest models of soft contact lenses, based on hydrogel material, had a level of oxygen permeability of around 6–8 Dk/t. Polymacon, the material used in the first hydrogel contact lenses in some countries in the 1960s and approved by the FDA in the U.S. in 1971, has a Dk of 9.

These days, typical values of oxygen permeability for hydrogel contact lenses range from 25 to 50. For example, Nelfilcon A has a Dk value of 26, and the Omafilcon A has a Dk of 25.

While those numbers are typical of hydrogel contact lenses, many contact lenses are made of silicone hydrogel, which has a much higher oxygen permeability. For example, the Dk value of Lotrafilcon B and Comfilcon A, two silicone hydrogels, is 110 and 128, respectively. These values are more than twice the values of oxygen permeability for hydrogel materials.

D being diffusivity (cm^{2}/sec) – a measure of how fast the oxygen moves through the material. Note, different sources may use different units: contact package inserts often use cm^{2}/sec, while academic papers may use other values for distance such as mm^{2}/sec.

k being the solubility (ml O_{2}/ml of material × mm Hg) – a measure of how much oxygen is contained in the material. Once again, various sources may use units of different sizes. Do not assume that they're the same unless specified by the source.

== See also ==
- Barrer – unit of gas permeability of membranes and contact lenses
- Oxygen transmission rate
