= Jimlín =

- Municipality
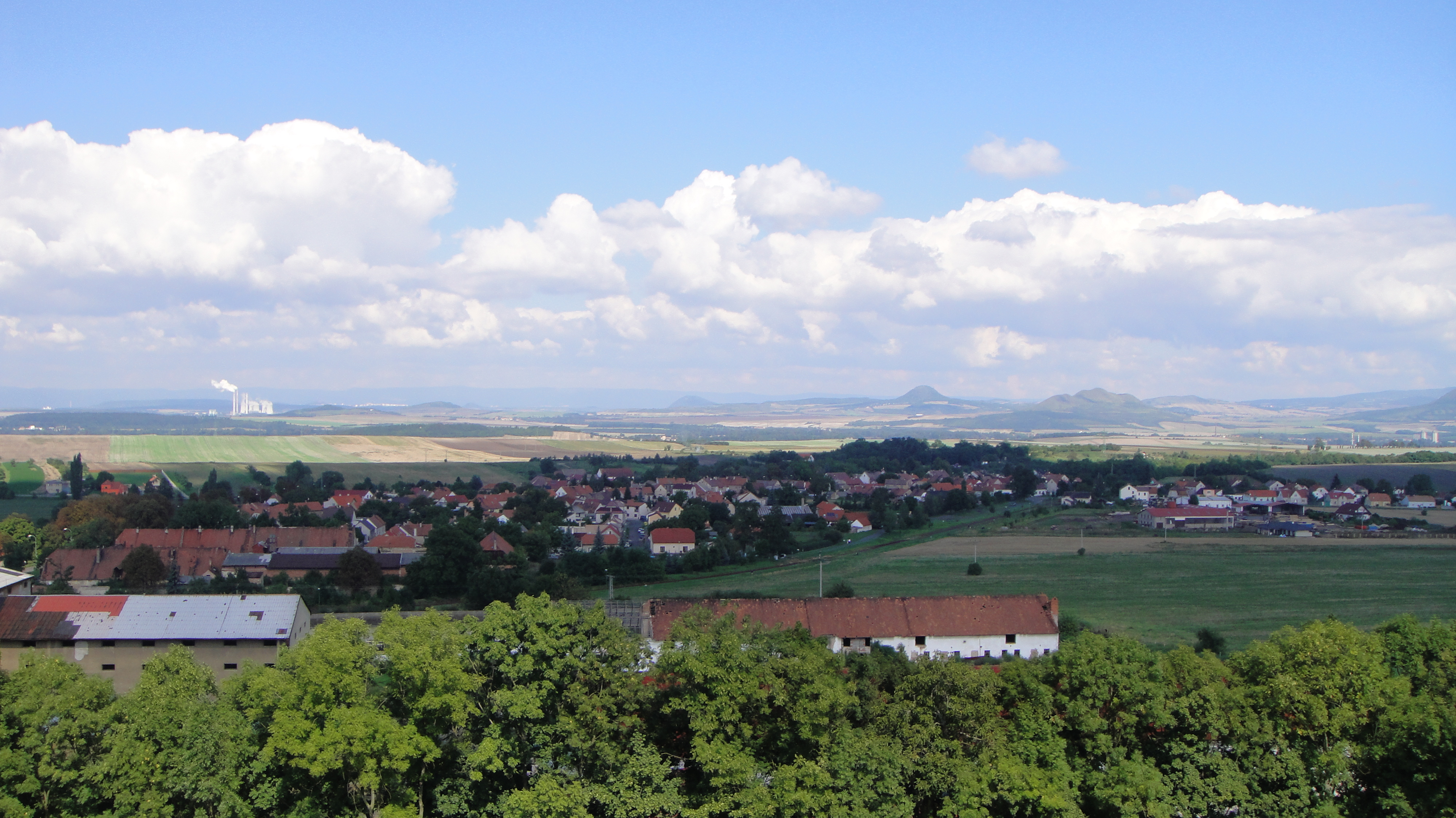
- General view

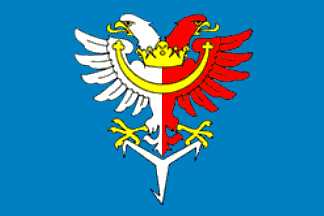
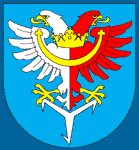
- Flag Coat of arms

- Location in the Czech Republic
- Coordinates: 50°19′4″N 13°44′42″E
- Country: Czech Republic
- Region: Ústí nad Labem
- District: Louny
- First mentioned: 1265

Area
  - Total: 9.83 km^{2} (3.80 sq mi)
- Elevation: 242 m (794 ft)

Population (2026-01-01)
  - Total: 887
  - Density: 90.2/km^{2} (234/sq mi)
- Time zone: UTC+1 (CET)
  - Summer (DST): UTC+2 (CEST)
- Postal code: 440 01
- Website: www.jimlin.cz

Jimlín is a municipality and village in Louny District in the Ústí nad Labem Region of the Czech Republic. It has about 900 inhabitants.

Jimlín lies approximately 7 kilometres (4 mi) south-west of Louny, 45 km (28 mi) south-west of Ústí nad Labem, and 55 km (34 mi) north-west of Prague.

== Administrative division ==
Jimlín consists of two municipal parts (in brackets population according to the 2021 census):

- Jimlín (445)
- Zěmechy (422)

== Demographics ==
Historical population
Year	Pop.	±%
1869	797	—
1880	921	+15.6%
1890	959	+4.1%
1900	1,134	+18.2%
1910	1,327	+17.0%
1921	1,349	+1.7%
1930	1,459	+8.2%
1950	1,210	−17.1%
1961	1,225	+1.2%
1970	1,106	−9.7%
1980	928	−16.1%
1991	716	−22.8%
2001	722	+0.8%
2011	815	+12.9%
2021	867	+6.4%
Source: Censuses
