= Rigid gas permeable lens =

Type of contact lens

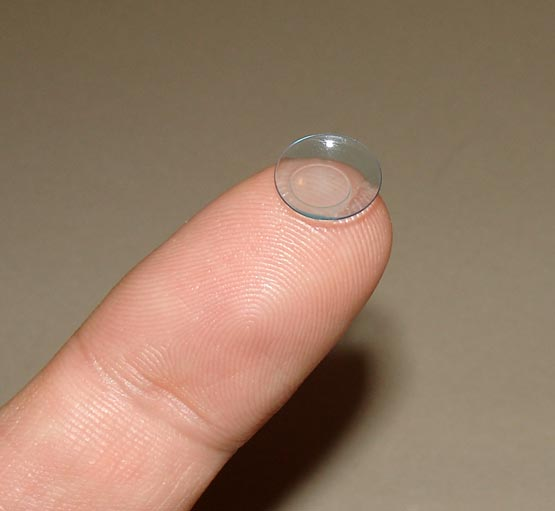
Rigid gas-permeable (RGP) lens

A rigid gas-permeable lens, also known as an RGP lens, GP lens, or colloquially, a hard contact lens, is a rigid contact lens made of oxygen-permeable polymers. Initially developed in the late 1970s, and through the 1980s and 1990s, they were an improvement over previous 'hard' lenses that restricted oxygen transmission to the eye.

Rigid lenses are able to replace the natural shape of the cornea with a new refracting surface. This means that a regular (spherical) rigid contact lens can provide good vision for people with astigmatism or distorted corneal shapes, as seen in keratoconus. However, they require a period of adaptation before full comfort is achieved.

RGP lenses have various benefits over soft contact lenses, including better durability, clearer vision, and a lower risk of eye infections, claim Hashemi et al. (2019). However, they demand a lengthier adaptation period and a more specific fit.
