= August Müller (inventor) =

August Müller (1864 – 1949), born in Mönchengladbach, was a medical student at the University of Kiel, Germany, and a pioneer in the manufacture of contact lenses. In 1889, he presented at the university his doctoral thesis titled Eyeglasses and corneal lenses in which he described his efforts to grind scleral lenses from blown glass. Refinements in his process led him to be able to correct his own severe -14 dioptre myopia to within 0.50 D.

Müller's compatriot Adolf Fick had published his work on contact lenses earlier in 1887, but his lenses were heavy and could only be worn for short periods. Müller's lenses were lighter and shaped to match the curved contour of the cornea. He suggested that the lens would remain in place on the cornea due to capillary action lubricated by the tear film.

Müller called his development Hornhautlinsen or 'corneal lenses'. His efforts to develop a new corrective lens were ultimately unsuccessful, since a patient could only tolerate the lens bearing down heavily on the sclera for half an hour, less than those of Fick. Moreover, it had to be inserted underwater to prevent trapping air bubbles, and cocaine administered to anaesthetise the eye, but he did however lay the groundwork for later researchers and his ideas and recommendations on fit, tear flow and rounded edges still form the basis for contact lens fitting today.

In 1932, Müller donated three lenses to the German Museum in Munich. These were the same lenses that he had discussed in his thesis.
