= Polymacon =

Names
- IUPAC name 2-Hydroxyethyl 2-methylprop-2-enoate--ethane-1,2-diyl bis(2-methylprop-2-enoate)

Identifiers
CAS Number	25053-81-0
ChemSpider	none
CompTox Dashboard (EPA)	DTXSID40179749
- Except where otherwise noted, data are given for materials in their standard state (at 25 °C [77 °F], 100 kPa). Infobox references

Polymacon is a non-proprietary (i.e., generic) term for a hydrophilic polymer of 2-hydroxyethylmethacrylate (HEMA) cross-linked with ethylene glycol dimethacrylate (62%) and water (38%). It is used in the manufacture of soft contact lenses, and is considered a low-hydration hydrogel of nonionic polymer.
