= Polymegethism =

Medical condition of the eye

Polymegethism is a greater than normal variation in size of the corneal endothelial cells.

Causes include aging, contact lens wear, ocular surgery, trauma and damage.
