= Louis J. Girard =

Louis J. Girard helped to popularize contact lens fitting as a medical procedure. He was co-author with Whitney J. Sampson, MD and Joseph W. Soper of a text, Contact lenses, published in 1968.

Dr. Girard was Professor of Ophthalmology at the Baylor College of Medicine in Houston, Texas. He served as chair of the department from 1958 to 1970.

Dr. Girard is a graduate of Rice University and wrote the Rice Fight Song for the Rice Owls in 1940. In 1985, he received the university's Distinguished Alumni Award.
