= Glycidyl methacrylate =

Names
- IUPAC name 2-Oxiranylmethyl 2-methylacrylate
- Systematic IUPAC name oxiran-2-ylmethyl 2-methylprop-2-enoate
- Other names: Glycidyl methacrylate; 2,3-Epoxypropyl methacrylate; 2-((Methacryloxy)methyl)oxirane; Methacryloyloxymethyloxirane; GMA 1618; Blemmer G; Glycidol methacrylate; Acryester G; XY 820; Sartomer 379

Identifiers
CAS Number	106-91-2
3D model (JSmol)	Interactive image
ChEBI	CHEBI:132844
ChemSpider	7549
ECHA InfoCard	100.003.130
PubChem CID	7837
UNII	R8WN29J8VF
CompTox Dashboard (EPA)	DTXSID0025361
- InChI: InChI=1S/C7H10O3/c1-5(2)7(8)10-4-6-3-9-6/h6H,1,3-4H2,2H3 Key: VOZRXNHHFUQHIL-UHFFFAOYSA-N; InChI=1/C7H10O3/c1-5(2)7(8)10-4-6-3-9-6/h6H,1,3-4H2,2H3 Key: VOZRXNHHFUQHIL-UHFFFAOYAT
- SMILES: CC(=C)C(=O)OCC1CO1

Properties
Chemical formula	C_{7}H_{10}O_{3}
Molar mass	142.154 g·mol^{−1}
Appearance	colorless liquid
Density	1.07 g/cm^{3}
Boiling point	189.0 °C (372.2 °F; 462.1 K)
Solubility in water	approx. 50 g/L

Hazards
Flash point	76.0 °C (168.8 °F; 349.1 K)
Autoignition temperature	389.0 °C (732.2 °F; 662.1 K)
- Except where otherwise noted, data are given for materials in their standard state (at 25 °C [77 °F], 100 kPa). verify (what is ?) Infobox references

Glycidyl methacrylate (GMA) is an ester of methacrylic acid and glycidol. Containing both an epoxide and an acrylate group, the molecule is bifunctional. It is a common monomer used in the production of epoxy resins. While typical home epoxies contain diglycidyl ether of bisphenol A (DGEBA), glycidyl methacrylate is instead used to provide epoxy functionalization to polyolefins and other acrylate polymers. It is used to prepare a range of composites.

== Safety ==
Glycidyl methacrylate is on World Health Organization’s International Agency for Research on Cancer (IARC) list of substances that are probably carcinogenic to humans. It is combustible; its toxic effects upon contact include skin burns and eye damage.

== History ==
On October 20, 2026, a large industrial chemical tank in Toledo, Ohio containing glycidyl methacrylate ruptured due to an "error while the material was being transferred." The city allowed "the chemical to vent instead of trying to stop the leak, saying that would be more dangerous." This situation led to an evacuation of up to one mile from the tank and a shelter-in-place within three miles of the tank.

== See also ==
- Methacrylate
