= Geoffrey W. Coates =

American polymer chemist

- Born: Geoffrey William Coates; 1966 (age 59–60); Evansville, Indiana, United States
- Education: Wabash College BS 1989; Stanford University Ph.D. 1994
- Scientific career
- Fields: Polymer chemistry
- Thesis: Preparation of novel polymer architectures using homogeneous Ziegler-Natta catalysts (1994)
- Doctoral advisor: Robert Waymouth
- Other academic advisors: Robert H. Grubbs
- Website: coates.chem.cornell.edu

Geoffrey "Geoff" William Coates (born 1966) is an American chemist and the Tisch University Professor in the department of chemistry and chemical biology at Cornell University.

== Early life and education ==
Coates was born in 1966 in Evansville, Indiana. He received a B.A. degree in chemistry from Wabash College in 1989. He entered graduate school at Stanford University where he worked with Robert M. Waymouth as a Hertz Fellow. His thesis work investigated the stereoselectivity of metallocene-based Ziegler-Natta catalysts. He was awarded a Ph.D. in organic chemistry in 1994. Coates then was a NSF Postdoctoral Fellow with Robert H. Grubbs at the California Institute of Technology. At Caltech, Coates worked on ring-closing metathesis reactions to functionalize polyolefins, and supramolecular phenyl-perfluorophenyl pi-stacking interactions.

== Independent career ==
In 1997, Coates joined the faculty of Cornell University. He was promoted to Associate Professor in 2001, and to Professor in 2002. He was appointed to the first Tisch University Professorship in 2008.

== Selected honors and professional activities ==
Coates has received numerous awards for his work in organometallic and polymer chemistry.

- Alfred P. Sloan Foundation Research Fellow
- ACS Arthur C. Cope Scholar Award
- 1997 - Camille and Henry Dreyfus New Faculty Award
- 1999 - Named by the MIT Technology Review as a TR100 Innovator Under 35
- 2000 - David and Lucile Packard Foundation Fellowship in Science and Engineering
- 2000 - Camille Dreyfus Teacher-Scholar Award
- 2006 - American Association for the Advancement of Science Fellow
- 2007/08 - Regional Finalist of the Blavatanik Award
- 2009 - ACS Carl S. Marvel Creative Polymer Chemistry Award
- 2011 - Elected member of American Academy of Arts & Sciences
- 2017 - Elected member of National Academy of Inventors
- 2017 - Elected member of National Academy of Sciences
- 2020 - Scientific Advisory Board for the Welch Foundation
- 2022 - ENI award Advanced Environmental Solutions prize
- 2023 - NAS Award for the Industrial Application of Science
- 2026 - Benjamin Franklin Prize in Chemistry
- 2026 - Balzan Prize

== Entrepreneurship and affiliations ==
Coates is the scientific cofounder of Novomer, Ecolectro, Intermix Performance Materials, and Imperion Coatings. Novomer was acquired by Danimer Scientific in 2021. Coates is a member of the Scientific Advisory Board of KensaGroup and is a member of the Scientific Advisory Board of the Welch Foundation. He is a Director of the Board of the Mitsubishi Chemical Group. Coates was an associate editor of the journal Macromolecules from 2008 to 2021, and is now an associate editor of the Journal of the American Chemical Society.
