= Polyhydroxyethylmethacrylate =

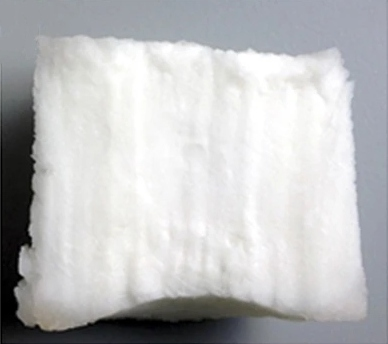
- pHEMA gel

Names
- IUPAC name Poly(2-hydroxyethyl methacrylate)
- Other names PHEMA, poly-HEMA, Hydron

Identifiers
CAS Number	25249-16-5
ChemSpider	None
PubChem CID	24898472
CompTox Dashboard (EPA)	DTXSID001011270

Properties
Chemical formula	(C_{6}H_{10}O_{3})_{n}
Molar mass	Variable
- Except where otherwise noted, data are given for materials in their standard state (at 25 °C [77 °F], 100 kPa). Infobox references

Poly(2-hydroxyethyl methacrylate) (pHEMA) is a polymer that forms a hydrogel in water. It was invented by Drahoslav Lim and Otto Wichterle for biological use. Together they succeeded in preparing a cross-linking gel which absorbed up to 40% of water, exhibited suitable mechanical properties and was transparent. They patented this material in 1953.

== Synthesis ==
pHEMA hydrogel for intraocular lenses can be synthesized by solution polymerization using 2-hydroxyethyl methacrylate (HEMA) as raw material, ammonium persulfate and sodium pyrosulfite (APS/SMBS) as catalyst, and triethyleneglycol dimethacrylate (TEGDMA) as cross-linking additive.

== Applications ==
=== Contact lenses ===
In 1959, this material was first used as an optical implant. Wichterle thought pHEMA might be a suitable material for a contact lens and gained his first patent for soft contact lenses. By late 1961, he succeeded in producing the first four pHEMA hydrogel contact lenses on a home-made apparatus.

Copolymers of pHEMA are still widely used today. Poly-HEMA functions as a hydrogel by rotating around its central carbon. In air, the non-polar methyl side turns outward, making the material brittle and easy to grind into the correct lens shape. In water, the polar hydroxyethyl side turns outward and the material becomes flexible. Pure pHEMA yields lenses that are too thick for sufficient oxygen to diffuse through, so all contact lenses that are pHEMA based are manufactured with copolymers that make the gel thinner and increase its water of hydration. These copolymer hydrogel lenses are often suffixed "-filcon", such as Methafilcon, which is a copolymer of hydroxyethyl methacrylate and methyl methacrylate. Another copolymer hydrogel lens, called Polymacon, is a copolymer of hydroxyethyl methacrylate and ethylene glycol dimethacrylate.

=== Cell culture ===
pHEMA is commonly used to coat cell culture flasks in order to prevent cell adhesion and induce spheroid formation, particularly in cancer research. Older alternatives to pHEMA include agar and agarose gels.
