= Sun Odyssey 40.3 =

Sailboat class

Development
- Designer: Daniel Andrieu
- Location: France
- Year: 2004
- Builder: Jeanneau
- Role: Cruiser

Boat
- Displacement: 17,835 lb (8,090 kg)
- Draft: 6.40 ft (1.95 m)

Hull
- Type: monohull
- Construction: fiberglass
- LOA: 40.03 ft (12.20 m)
- LWL: 35.24 ft (10.74 m)
- Beam: 12.96 ft (3.95 m)
- Engine: diesel engine

Hull appendages
- Keel: fin keel, with weighted bulb
- Ballast: 5,357 lb (2,430 kg)
- Rudder: spade-type rudder

Rig
- Rig type: Bermuda rig
- I foretriangle height: 50.03 ft (15.25 m)
- J foretriangle base: 13.81 ft (4.21 m)
- P mainsail luff: 43.31 ft (13.20 m)
- E mainsail foot: 15.75 ft (4.80 m)

Sails
- Sailplan: masthead sloop
- Mainsail area: 341.07 sq ft (31.686 m^{2})
- Jib/genoa area: 345.46 sq ft (32.094 m^{2})
- Total sail area: 686.52 sq ft (63.780 m^{2})

Racing
- PHRF: 90-120

The Sun Odyssey 40.3 is a French sailboat that was designed by Daniel Andrieu as a cruiser and was first built in 2004.

The Sun Odyssey 40.3 is a development of the Sun Odyssey 40, using the same hull design with a new deck and interior design.

== Production ==
The design was built by Jeanneau in France, from 2004 to 2007, but it is now out of production.

== Design ==
The Sun Odyssey 40.3 is a recreational keelboat, built predominantly of vinylester and polyester fiberglass, with a structural grid and wood trim. It has a masthead sloop rig, with a deck-stepped mast, two sets of swept spreaders and aluminum spars with stainless steel wire rigging. It has a roller furling genoa and mast-furling mainsail. The hull has a raked stem, a reverse transom with a swimming platform, an internally mounted spade-type rudder controlled by dual wheels and a fixed fin keel with a weighted bulb or optional shoal draft keel. It displaces 17,835 lb (8,090 kg) and carries 5,357 lb (2,430 kg) of ballast.

The boat has a draft of 6.40 ft (1.95 m) with the standard keel and 4.92 ft (1.50 m) with the optional shoal draft keel.

The boat is fitted with a diesel engine for docking and maneuvering. The fuel tank holds 36 U.S. gallons (140 L; 30 imp gal) and the fresh water tank has a capacity of 82 U.S. gallons (310 L; 68 imp gal).

The design was built with the option of a two or three-cabin interior. It provides sleeping accommodation for four to six people, with a double "V"-berth in the bow cabin, a U-shaped settee and a straight settee in the main cabin and an aft cabin with a double berth on the starboard side. The aft cabin may be subdivided to create the third cabin, each equipped with a double berth. The galley is located on the starboard side just forward of the companionway ladder. The galley is L-shaped and is equipped with a two-burner stove, an ice box and a double sink. A navigation station is opposite the galley, on the starboard side. The two cabin layout has one head, located aft, on the port side. The three cabin design adds a second head in the bow cabin on the starboard side.

For sailing downwind the design may be equipped with a symmetrical spinnaker.

The design has a hull speed of 7.95 kn (14.72 km/h) and a PHRF handicap of 90 to 120.

== Operational history ==
In a 2004 review for Sailing Magazine, John Kretschmer wrote, "When we cleared the harbor mouth we swung into the wind and set the main-about a 30-second procedure with the in-mast furler. Such furling systems have their drawbacks in the form of sail shape and performance but anyone who dreads setting the main because of the inevitable struggle that comes later when they have to take it down will appreciate the ease and peace of mind that comes with this option. Just as quickly we unfurled the genoa and eased off on a reach. ... it wasn't difficult to imagine ourselves relaxing at anchor, enjoying an icy cold beverage from the cockpit icebox and planning where the next day's sail would take us. That's probably what designer Andrieau had in mind when he worked on the 40.3-a nice-sailing boat for summer cruising with all the comforts of home."

== See also ==
- List of sailing boat types
