= Wood stabilization =

Treatment of wood to improve properties

Wood stabilization is a number of processes which use pressure and/or vacuum to impregnate wood cellular structure with certain monomers, acrylics, phenolics or other resins to improve dimensional stability, biological durability, hardness, and other material properties. When exposed to moisture through humidity absorption or direct immersion, most wood species will swell and change shape. When moisture comes into contact with wood, the water molecules penetrate the cell wall and become bound to cell wall components through hydrogen bonding. With addition of water to the cell wall, wood volume increases nearly proportionally to the volume of water added. Swelling increases until the fiber saturation point has been reached. Wood stabilization limits water absorption into the wood structure, thereby limiting the dimensional changes which arise from moisture exposure.

Wood stabilization is a subset of wood preservation processes specifically used by woodworkers to alter the material properties of specific wood species for applications within their craft or trade. Examples of wood items which are commonly stabilized include knife handles, pistol grips, straight razors, game calls and jewelry. One of the most commonly used stabilizing methods utilizes a heat cured polymer known as methyl methacrylate (MMA).

== Material properties ==
Material properties of stabilized wood varies by specific species and type of stabilization process used, however in softwoods and soft hardwoods, the improvement in strength, hardness and durability can be dramatic. For example, Poplar treated with MMA increased specimen density by 2.2 to 2.6 times with gains in hardness of approximately twofold (using the Janka hardness test).
