= (Hydroxyethyl)methacrylate =

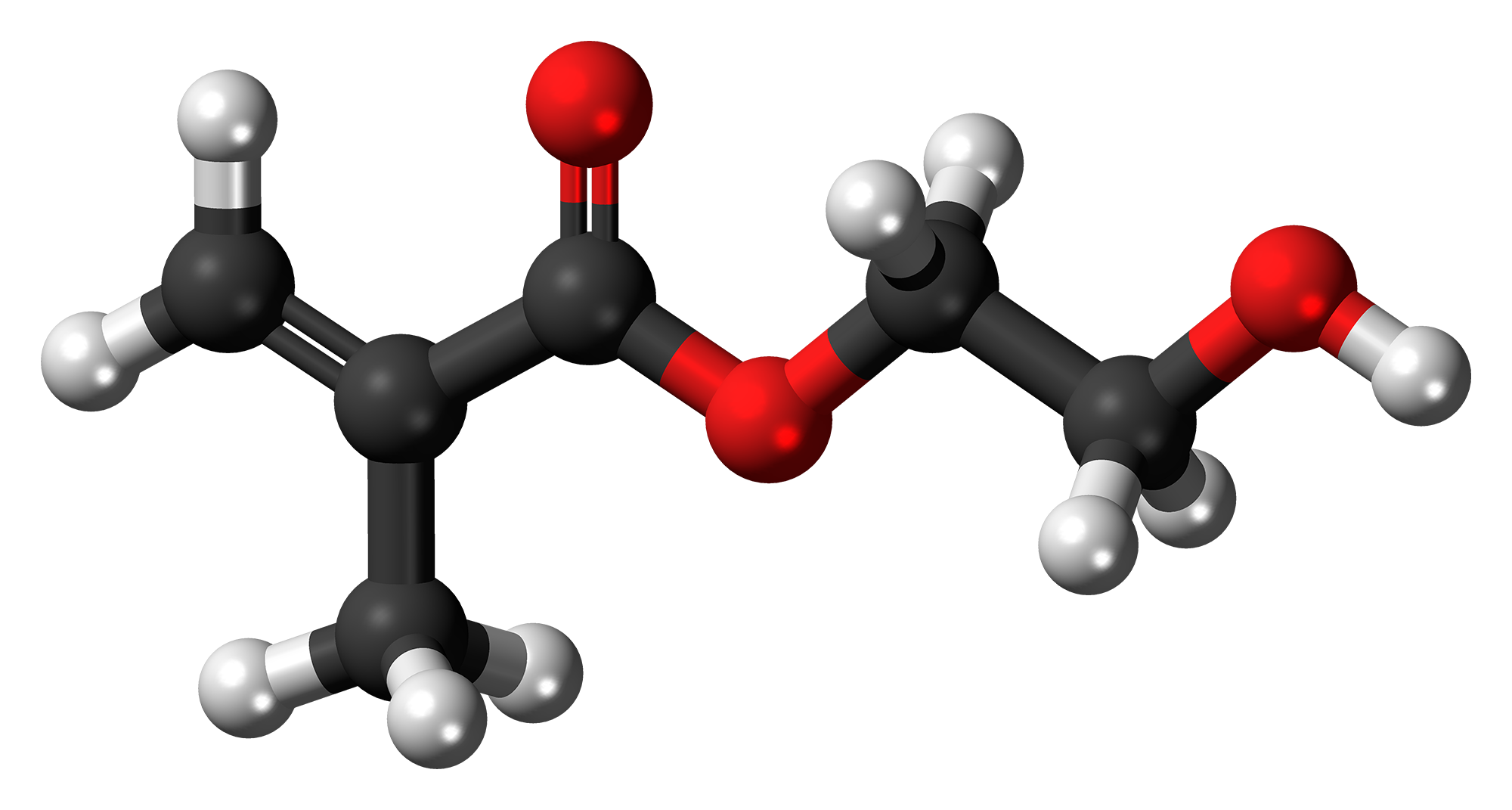

Names
- Preferred IUPAC name 2-Hydroxyethyl 2-methylprop-2-enoate
- Other names: HEMA; hydroxyethylmethacrylate; glycol methacrylate; glycol monomethacrylate; hydroxyethyl methacrylate; ethylene glycol methacrylate; 2-(methacryloyloxy)ethanol

Identifiers
CAS Number	868-77-9
3D model (JSmol)	Interactive image; Interactive image
Beilstein Reference	1071583
ChEBI	CHEBI:34288
ChEMBL	ChEMBL1730239
ChemSpider	12791
ECHA InfoCard	100.011.621
EC Number	212-782-2
Gmelin Reference	936557
KEGG	C14530
PubChem CID	13360
RTECS number	OZ4725000
UNII	6E1I4IV47V
CompTox Dashboard (EPA)	DTXSID00891152 DTXSID7022128, DTXSID00891152
- InChI: InChI=1S/C6H10O3/c1-5(2)6(8)9-4-3-7/h7H,1,3-4H2,2H3 Key: WOBHKFSMXKNTIM-UHFFFAOYSA-N; InChI=1/C6H10O3/c1-5(2)6(8)9-4-3-7/h7H,1,3-4H2,2H3 Key: WOBHKFSMXKNTIM-UHFFFAOYAH
- SMILES: O=C(OCCO)\C(=C)C; CC(=C)C(=O)OCCO

Properties
Chemical formula	C_{6}H_{10}O_{3}
Molar mass	130.143 g·mol^{−1}
Appearance	Colourless liquid
Density	1.07 g/cm^{3}
Melting point	−99 °C (−146 °F; 174 K)
Boiling point	213 °C (415 °F; 486 K)
Solubility in water	miscible
log P	0.50
Vapor pressure	0.08 hPa

Hazards
- Occupational safety and health (OHS/OSH)
Main hazards	Eye irritation
- GHS labelling
Pictograms	(GHS07: Exclamation mark)
Signal word	Warning
Hazard statements	H315, H317, H319
Precautionary statements	P261, P264, P272, P280, P302+P352, P305+P351+P338, P321, P332+P313, P333+P313, P337+P313, P362, P363, P501
Flash point	97 °C (207 °F; 370 K)
- Except where otherwise noted, data are given for materials in their standard state (at 25 °C [77 °F], 100 kPa). verify (what is ?) Infobox references

Hydroxyethylmethacrylate (also known as glycol methacrylate or HEMA) is an organic compound with the chemical formula H_{2}C=C(CH_{3})CO_{2}CH_{2}CH_{2}OH. It is a colorless viscous liquid that readily polymerizes, i.e. it is a monomer that is used to make various polymers.

== Synthesis ==
Hydroxyethylmethacrylate was first synthesized around 1925. Common methods of synthesis are:

- reaction of methacrylic acid with ethylene oxide:

H_{2}C=C(CH_{3})CO_{2}H + CH_{2}CH_{2}O → H_{2}C=C(CH_{3})CO_{2}CH_{2}CH_{2}OH

- esterification of methacrylic acid with a large excess of ethylene glycol.

H_{2}C=C(CH_{3})CO_{2}H + HOCH_{2}CH_{2}OH → H_{2}C=C(CH_{3})CO_{2}CH_{2}CH_{2}OH + H_{2}O

Both approaches also yield small amounts of ethylene glycol dimethacrylate, a polymer crosslinking agent.

== Properties ==
Hydroxyethylmethacrylate is completely miscible with water and ethanol, but its polymer is practically insoluble in common solvents. Its viscosity is 0.0701 Pa⋅s at 20°C and 0.005 Pa⋅s at 30°C. During polymerization, it shrinks by approximately 6%.

== Applications ==
=== Contact lenses ===
In 1960, O. Wichterle and D. Lím described its use in synthesis of hydrophilic crosslinked networks, and these results had great importance for manufacture of soft contact lenses. Polyhydroxyethylmethacrylate is hydrophilic: it is capable of absorbing from 10 to 600% water relative to its dry weight. Because of this property, it was one of the first materials to be used in the manufacture of soft contact lenses.

=== Use in 3D printing ===
Hydroxyethylmethacrylate lends itself well to applications in sterolithography as it cures quickly at room temperature when exposed to UV light in the presence of photoinitiators. It may be used as a monomeric matrix in which 40nm silica particles are suspended for 3D glass printing. When combined with a suitable blowing agent such as an organic carbonate (e.g. BOC anhydride), it forms a foaming resin which expands when heated.

=== Cosmetics ===
Hydroxyethylmethacrylate is the most common ingredient in cosmetic nail products, where it is used as a resin base and in polishes, primers, coats, and gels. Hydroxyethylmethacrylate is also a component of cosmetics glues for the application of eyelash and hair extensions.

As a known skin irritant, European Union regulations mandate labeling of products that contain hydroxyethylmethacrylate, with limited compliance. Products are also restricted to professionals.

=== Other ===
In electron microscopy and light microscopy, hydroxyethylmethacrylate serves as an embedding medium.

When treated with polyisocyanates, polyhydroxyethylmethacrylate makes a crosslinked polymer (an acrylic resin) that is a useful component in paints.

== Hazards ==
Hydroxyethylmethacrylate is mildly toxic to humans but is a potent allergen.
