= Ethylene glycol dimethacrylate =

- Skeletal formula

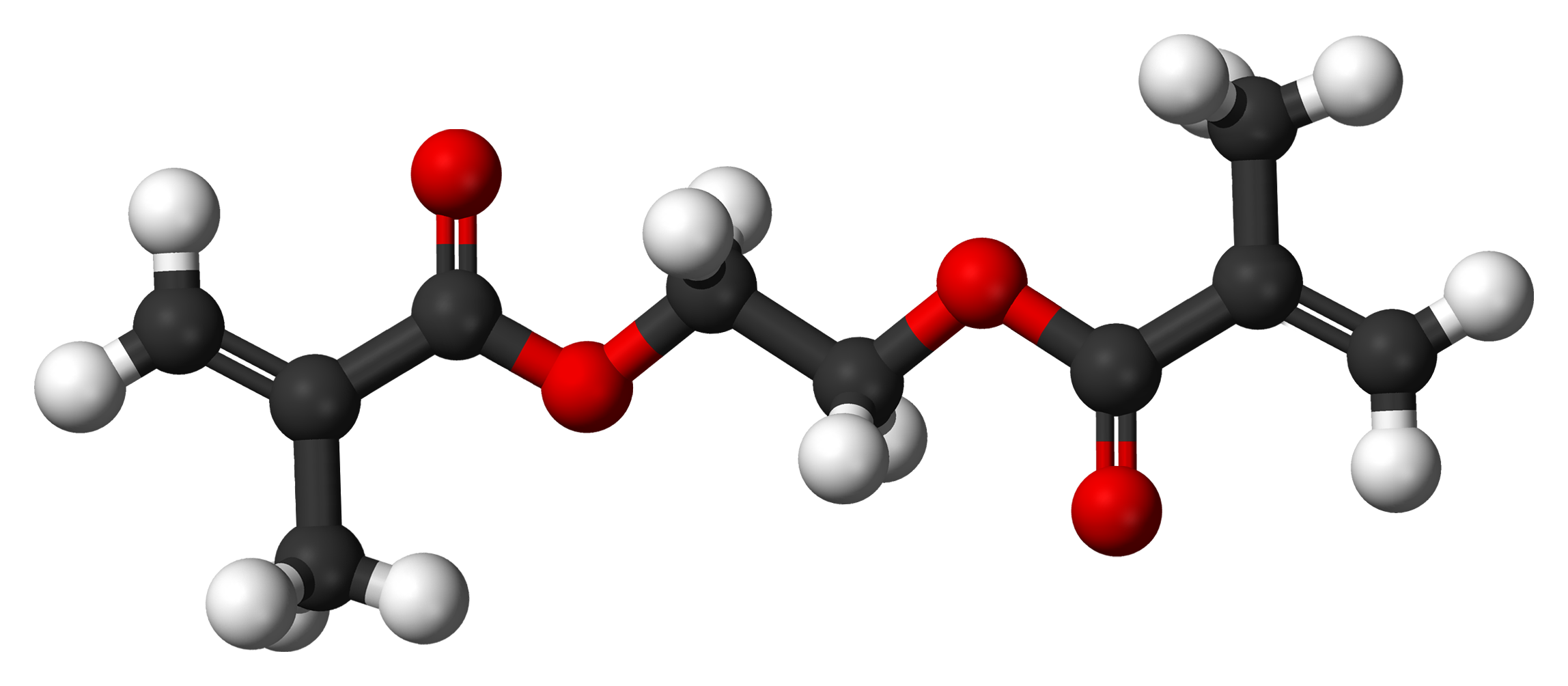
- Ball-and-stick model

Names
- Preferred IUPAC name Ethane-1,2-diyl bis(2-methylprop-2-enoate)
- Other names Methacrylic acid, ethylene ester; 1,2-Bis(methacryloyloxy)ethane; 1,2-Ethanediol dimethacrylate; Diglycol dimethacrylate; Ethanediol dimethacrylate; Ethylene dimethacrylate; Ethylene glycol bis(methacrylate); Ethylene glycol dimethacrylate; Ethylene methacrylate; 2-(Methacryloyloxy)ethyl methacrylate

Identifiers
CAS Number	97-90-5
3D model (JSmol)	Interactive image
Abbreviations	EGDMA
Beilstein Reference	1776663
ChEBI	CHEBI:53436
ChEMBL	ChEMBL1709582
ChemSpider	7077
ECHA InfoCard	100.002.380
EC Number	202-617-2
Gmelin Reference	637376
PubChem CID	7355
RTECS number	OZ4400000
UNII	7BK5G69305
CompTox Dashboard (EPA)	DTXSID20891154 DTXSID1026615, DTXSID20891154
- InChI: InChI=1S/C10H14O4/c1-7(2)9(11)13-5-6-14-10(12)8(3)4/h1,3,5-6H2,2,4H3 Key: STVZJERGLQHEKB-UHFFFAOYSA-N
- SMILES: CC(=C)C(=O)OCCOC(=O)C(=C)C

Properties
Chemical formula	C_{10}H_{14}O_{4}
Molar mass	198.218 g·mol^{−1}
Density	1.051 g/mL
Melting point	−40 °C (−40 °F; 233 K)
Boiling point	98 to 100 °C (208 to 212 °F; 371 to 373 K) (5 mmHg)

Hazards
- GHS labelling
Pictograms	(GHS07: Exclamation mark)
Signal word	Warning
Hazard statements	H315, H317, H319, H335, H412
Precautionary statements	P261, P264, P271, P272, P273, P280, P302+P352, P304+P340, P305+P351+P338, P312, P321, P332+P313, P333+P313, P337+P313, P362, P363, P403+P233, P405, P501
Flash point	101 °C (214 °F; 374 K)
- Except where otherwise noted, data are given for materials in their standard state (at 25 °C [77 °F], 100 kPa). verify (what is ?) Infobox references

Ethylene glycol dimethylacrylate (EGDMA) is a diester formed by condensation of two equivalents of methacrylic acid with ethylene glycol. It is a colorless viscous liquid. It is sometimes called ethylene dimethacrylate.

== Polymerization ==
Containing a pair of reactive alkene groups, EGDMA is a crosslinking agent. Like other acrylates, it is susceptible free radical polymerization. When used with methyl methacrylate, it leads to gel point at relatively low concentrations because of the nearly equivalent reactivities of all the double bonds involved. As a monomer, It is used to prepare hydroxyapatite/methacrylate dental composites.

== Preparation ==
EGDMA is also synthesized by an esterification reaction of methacrylic acid with ethylene glycol:

2 H_{2}C=C(CH_{3})CO_{2}H + HOCH_{2}CH_{2}OH → H_{2}C=C(CH_{3})CO_{2}CH_{2}CH_{2}O_{2}C(CH_{3})C=CH_{2} + 2 H_{2}O

It also forms inadvertently in the reaction of ethylene oxide with methacrylic acid, which is usually intended to give (hydroxyethyl)methacrylate:

2 H_{2}C=C(CH_{3})CO_{2}H + C_{2}H_{4}O → H_{2}C=C(CH_{3})CO_{2}CH_{2}CH_{2}O_{2}C(CH_{3})C=CH_{2} + H_{2}O

== Safety ==
Its toxicity profile has been fairly well studied.
