= Sun Odyssey 40 =

Sailboat class

Development
- Designer: Daniel Andrieu
- Location: France
- Year: 1998
- Builder: Jeanneau
- Role: Cruiser
- Name: Sun Odyssey 40

Boat
- Displacement: 15,807 lb (7,170 kg)
- Draft: 6.40 ft (1.95 m)

Hull
- Type: monohull
- Construction: fiberglass
- LOA: 40.03 ft (12.20 m)
- LWL: 33.37 ft (10.17 m)
- Beam: 12.96 ft (3.95 m)
- Engine: Yanmar 56 hp (42 kW) diesel engine

Hull appendages
- Keel: fin keel
- Ballast: 5,291 lb (2,400 kg)
- Rudder: spade-type rudder

Rig
- Rig type: Bermuda rig

Sails
- Sailplan: masthead sloop
- Total sail area: 894.48 sq ft (83.100 m^{2})

Racing
- PHRF: 90-114

The Sun Odyssey 40 is a French sailboat that was designed by Daniel Andrieu as a cruiser and first built in 1998.

The boat uses the same hull design as the Sun Odyssey 40 DS and the 2004 Sun Odyssey 40.3.

== Production ==
The design was built by Jeanneau in France, from 1998 until 2004, but it is now out of production.

== Design ==
The Sun Odyssey 40 is a recreational keelboat, built predominantly of vinylester fiberglass, with wood trim. The hull is solid fiberglass, while the deck is balsa-cored, all with a ISO 9002 gelcoat. It has a masthead sloop rig with anodized aluminum spars, a raked stem, a reverse transom with a swimming platform, an internally mounted spade-type rudder controlled by dual wheels and a fixed fin keel or optional shoal-draft keel. The fin keel model displaces 15,807 lb (7,170 kg) and carries 5,291 lb (2,400 kg) of ballast, while the shoal draft keel version displaces carries 5,842 lb (2,650 kg) of ballast.

The boat has a draft of 6.40 ft (1.95 m) with the standard keel and 4.92 ft (1.50 m) with the optional shoal draft keel.

The boat is fitted with a Japanese Yanmar diesel engine of 56 hp (42 kW) for docking and maneuvering. The fuel tank holds 36 U.S. gallons (140 L; 30 imp gal) and the freshwater tank has a capacity of 85 U.S. gallons (320 L; 71 imp gal).

The design was built in three different interior layouts: a two-cabin arrangement with a forward owner's cabin plus an aft cabin, a three cabin layout with two heads and a three cabin layout with one head. The interior is finished in Burmese teak.

For sailing downwind the design may be equipped with a symmetrical spinnaker.

The boat has a PHRF handicap of 90 to 114.

== See also ==
- List of sailing boat types
