= Bis-HPPP =

Names
- Preferred IUPAC name 3,3′-[Propane-2,2-diylbis(4,1-phenyleneoxy)]di(propane-1,2-diol)
- Other names BADGE·2H_{2}O

Identifiers
CAS Number	5581-32-8
3D model (JSmol)	Interactive image
ChemSpider	99341
ECHA InfoCard	100.024.524
PubChem CID	110678
UNII	S5K2510L3D
CompTox Dashboard (EPA)	DTXSID10971212
- InChI: InChI=1S/C21H28O6/c1-21(2,15-3-7-19(8-4-15)26-13-17(24)11-22)16-5-9-20(10-6-16)27-14-18(25)12-23/h3-10,17-18,22-25H,11-14H2,1-2H3 Key: NISVZEWKUNUGQQ-UHFFFAOYSA-N; InChI=1/C21H28O6/c1-21(2,15-3-7-19(8-4-15)26-13-17(24)11-22)16-5-9-20(10-6-16)27-14-18(25)12-23/h3-10,17-18,22-25H,11-14H2,1-2H3 Key: NISVZEWKUNUGQQ-UHFFFAOYAT
- SMILES: OCC(O)COc1ccc(cc1)C(C)(C)c2ccc(OCC(O)CO)cc2

Properties
Chemical formula	C_{21}H_{28}O_{6}
Molar mass	376.449 g·mol^{−1}
- Except where otherwise noted, data are given for materials in their standard state (at 25 °C [77 °F], 100 kPa). verify (what is ?) Infobox references

Bis-HPPP (2,2-bis[4(2,3-hydroxypropoxy)phenyl]propane) is an organic compound that is formed when the dental composite material bis-GMA is degraded by salivary esterases. It is also called BADGE·2H_{2}O in reference to it being the hydrolyzed form of BADGE, which is used in the formation of epoxy resins. Structurally, it is a di-ether of bisphenol A.

== Formation ==
Together with methacrylic acid, bis-HPPP is released following the CE-catalyzed hydrolysis of 2,2-[4(2-hydroxy 3-methacryloxypropoxy)-phenyl]propane (bis-GMA). This reaction is very common in hydrolytic degradation of the dental resin since salivary esterases are able to cleave the ester bonds in acrylic polymers of dental composites.

Analysis by mass spectrometry demonstrated that hydrolytic reactions would cleave the ester bonds of both methacrylate units in bis-GMA and produce bis-HPPP along with two molecules of methacrylic acid.
