= Methylacrylate =

Methylacrylate may refer to:

- Methacrylate esters
- Anion of methacrylic acid
- Misspelling of methyl acrylate
