= Bis-GMA =

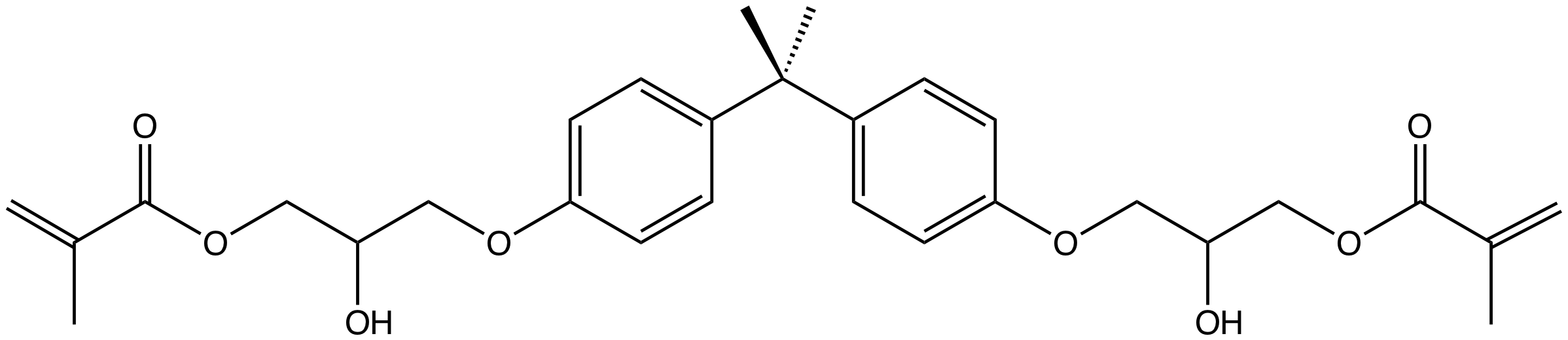

Names
- Preferred IUPAC name Propane-2,2-diylbis[4,1-phenyleneoxy(2-hydroxypropane-3,1-diyl)] bis(2-methylprop-2-enoate)
- Other names Bowen monomer; Silux; Delton; NuvaSeal; Retroplast

Identifiers
CAS Number	1565-94-2
3D model (JSmol)	Interactive image
ChemSpider	14549
ECHA InfoCard	100.014.880
EC Number	216-367-7
PubChem CID	15284
UNII	454I75YXY0
CompTox Dashboard (EPA)	DTXSID7044841
- InChI: InChI=1S/C29H36O8/c1-19(2)27(32)36-17-23(30)15-34-25-11-7-21(8-12-25)29(5,6)22-9-13-26(14-10-22)35-16-24(31)18-37-28(33)20(3)4/h7-14,23-24,30-31H,1,3,15-18H2,2,4-6H3 Key: AMFGWXWBFGVCKG-UHFFFAOYSA-N
- SMILES: CC(=C)C(=O)OCC(COC1=CC=C(C=C1)C(C)(C)C2=CC=C(C=C2)OCC(COC(=O)C(=C)C)O)O

Properties
Chemical formula	C_{29}H_{36}O_{8}
Molar mass	512.599 g·mol^{−1}
Appearance	colorless oil

Hazards
- GHS labelling
Pictograms	(GHS05: Corrosive) (GHS07: Exclamation mark)
Signal word	Danger
Hazard statements	H315, H317, H318, H319
Precautionary statements	P261, P264, P272, P280, P302+P352, P305+P351+P338, P310, P321, P332+P313, P333+P313, P337+P313, P362, P363, P501
- Except where otherwise noted, data are given for materials in their standard state (at 25 °C [77 °F], 100 kPa). Infobox references

Bis-GMA (bisphenol A-glycidyl methacrylate) is a resin commonly used in dental composite, dental sealants, and dental cement. It is a diester derived from methacrylic acid and bisphenol A diglycidyl ether. Bearing two polymerizable groups, it is prone to form a crosslinked polymer that is used in dental restorations. For dental work, highly viscous bis-GMA is mixed with aluminosilicate particles, crushed quartz, and other related acrylates; changes to component ratios result in different physical properties in the end product. Bis-GMA was first incorporated into composite dental resins in 1962 by Rafael Bowen. Until matrix development work in the early 2000s, bis-GMA and related methacrylate monomers were the only options for organic matrix composition.

== Safety ==
Concerns have been raised about the potential for bis-GMA to break down into or be contaminated with the related compound bisphenol A. However, no negative health effects of bis-GMA use in dental resins have been found.

== Composition ==
Salivary esterases can slowly degrade bis-GMA-based sealants, forming bis-HPPP.
