= Southport Boats =

American offshore fishing boat manufacturer

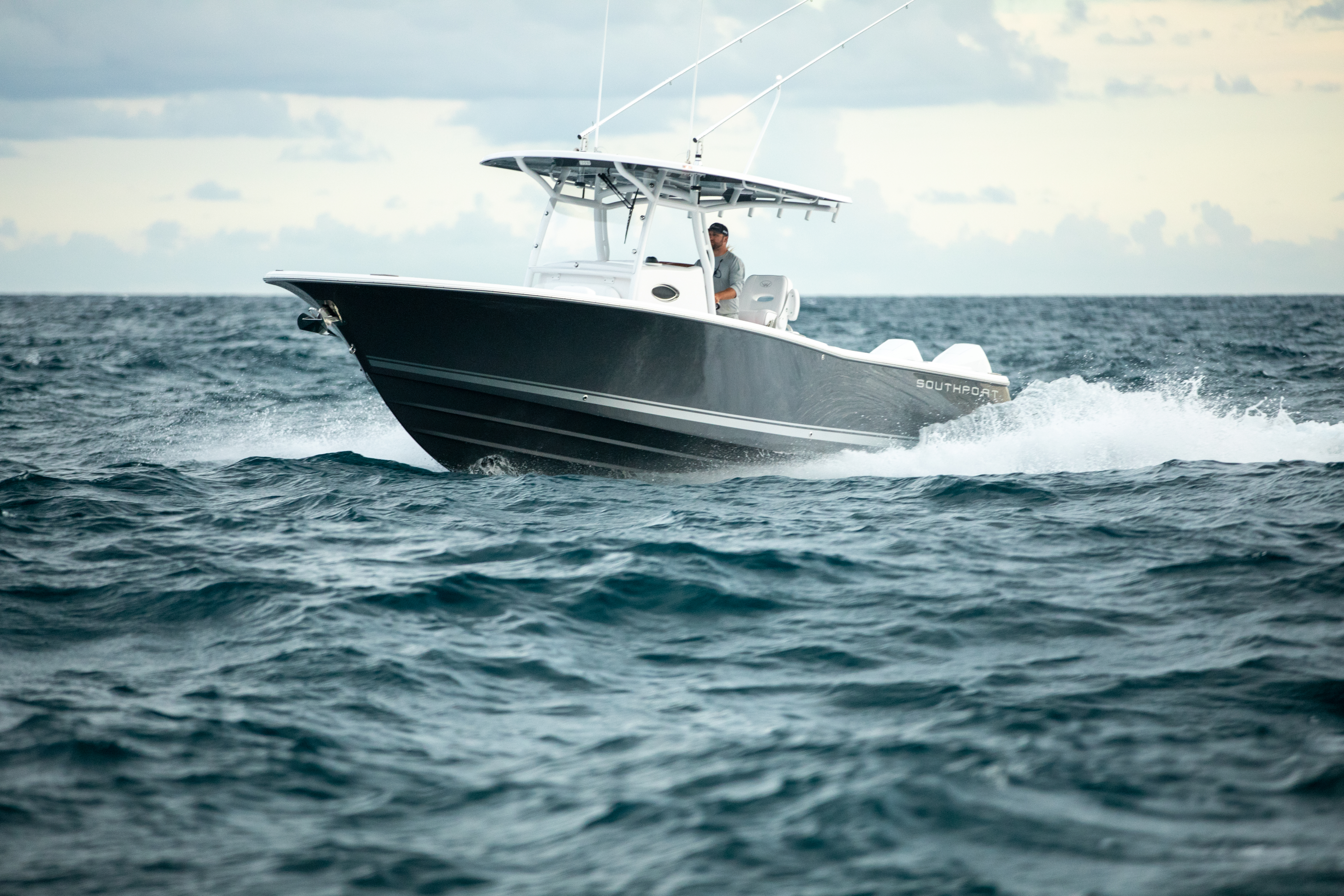
The Southport 30 FE in Fort Lauderdale, FL

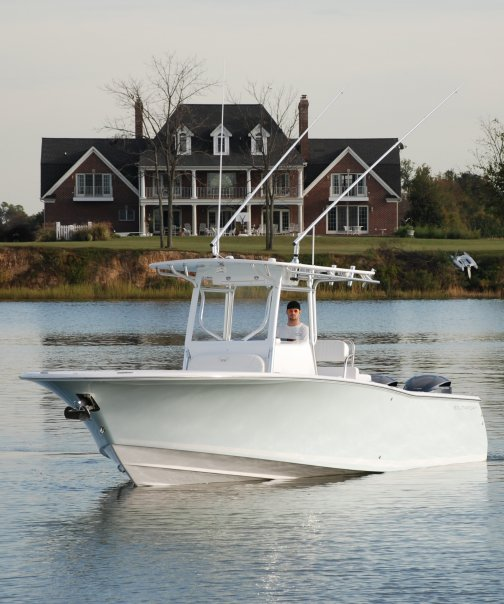
Southport 28CC, Hull #1, Ice Blue

Southport Boats is an American offshore fishing boat manufacturer based in South Gardiner, Maine. The Southport Hull was designed by naval architect C. Raymond Hunt and Associates. Southports are currently distributed through dealerships in the United States and Puerto Rico.

A Southport boat can be told apart from others in its class due to its wide beam, reverse transom and tumblehome aft, a clipper bow, and a "continuously variable deep-vee hull beginning at 22 degrees at the transom."

== Company history ==
Southport Boats began in North Carolina in 2003 as Southport Boat Works. In 2011, the Southport Boatworks brand was moved to Augusta, Maine under new ownership. Upon beginning operation in Maine, the company was re-branded as Southport Boats. In 2017, new company ownership moved the company to South Gardiner, ME, to its own dedicated 50,000 square-foot production facility. In 2018 Southport debuted the 33 DC, the brand's first step into the Dual Console market. In 2019, Southport debuted the 30 FE, as an evolutionary replacement for the Southport 292. The 30 offered modern layouts and spaces on the larger hull.

== Construction ==
Southport boats are built in the company's 50,000-square-foot (4,600 m^{2}) production plant in South Gardiner, Maine.

All Southports, like most other sport fishing boats, are made of fiberglass. The hull of the boat is made in a pre-fabricated mold, where the outer layer of gelcoat is applied first, then the layers of fiberglass. After the exterior hull is completed, the grid system is installed into the hull. A bonding agent called methacrylate is applied to ensure a complete bond with the grid system (the interior skeleton of the boat). The grid system is similar to the stringer system of older boats, but provides added strength because it is one integral piece including fore and aft as well as laterally running structural beams. The hull grid system, as well as any compartments not used for storage or fuel cells, are then completely filled with foam for basic flotation and vibration reduction.

The next step involves installing all wiring and assorted tanks and pumps. The grid system provides placement for all of these items, and a way to organize the wiring. The cockpit liner, or "main deck," is then bonded to the hull and stringer system with more methacrylate. Some of the parts, like the driving console, helm seats, and leaning post are constructed off-line and then installed into the completed hulls. After being detailed, the boats are wrapped in plastic from the gunwale up in order to protect the boat from damage during shipping.

== See also ==
- Center Console (boat)
- Four-stroke engine
