= HEMA =

HEMA may refer to:

- Historical European martial arts, martial arts of European origin
- HEMA (store), a Dutch department store
- ICAO code of Marsa Alam International Airport, Egypt
- Hydroxyethyl methacrylate
