= Methyl methacrylate (data page) =

Chemical data page

This page provides supplementary chemical data on Methyl methacrylate.

== Material Safety Data Sheet ==
The handling of this chemical may incur notable safety precautions. It is highly recommend that you seek the Material Safety Datasheet (MSDS) for this chemical from a reliable source such as ChemicalBook, and follow its directions.

== Structure and properties ==
Structure and properties
| Index of refraction, n_{D} | 1.4142 |
| Abbe number | ? |
| Dielectric constant, ε_{r} | 6.32 at 303.2 K |
| Bond strength | ? |
| Bond length | ? |
| Bond angle | ? |
| Magnetic susceptibility | 57.3 × 10^{−6}cm^{3}mol^{−1} |

== Thermodynamic properties ==
Phase behavior
| Triple point | ? K (? °C), ? Pa |
| Critical point | ? K (? °C), ? Pa |
| Std enthalpy change of fusion, Δ_{fus}H^{~~o~~} | 14.4 kJ/mol |
| Std entropy change of fusion, Δ_{fus}S^{~~o~~} | ? J/(mol·K) |
| Std enthalpy change of vaporization, Δ_{vap}H^{~~o~~} | 36.0 kJ/mol |
| Std entropy change of vaporization, Δ_{vap}S^{~~o~~} | ? J/(mol·K) |
Solid properties
| Std enthalpy change of formation, Δ_{f}H^{~~o~~}_{solid} | ? kJ/mol |
| Standard molar entropy, S^{~~o~~}_{solid} | ? J/(mol K) |
| Specific heat capacity, c_{p} | ? J/(mol K) |
Liquid properties
| Std enthalpy change of formation, Δ_{f}H^{~~o~~}_{liquid} | ? kJ/mol |
| Standard molar entropy, S^{~~o~~}_{liquid} | ? J/(mol K) |
| Specific heat capacity, c_{p} | 191.2 J/(mol K) |
Gas properties
| Std enthalpy change of formation, Δ_{f}H^{~~o~~}_{gas} | ? kJ/mol |
| Standard molar entropy, S^{~~o~~}_{gas} | ? J/(mol K) |
| Specific heat capacity, c_{p} | ? J/(mol K) |

== Spectral data ==
UV-Vis
| λ_{max} | ? nm |
| Extinction coefficient, ε | ? |
IR
| Major absorption bands | ? cm^{−1} |
NMR
| Proton NMR |
| Carbon-13 NMR |
| Other NMR data |
MS
| Masses of main fragments |

== Vapor pressure of liquid ==
| P in Pa | 100 | 1k | 10k | 100k |
| T in °C | -31 e | -1 e | 39.7 | 100.0 |

e - extrapolated data

== Thermal conductivity of liquid ==
| T in °C | 0 | 25 | 50 | 75 | 100 |
| Thermal Conductivity in W/m K | 0.156 | 0.147 | 0.137 | 0.127 | 0.117 |

This box:
- Except where noted otherwise, data relate to Standard temperature and pressure.
- Reliability of data general note.
