= Merkur (toy) =

Czech toy manufacturer

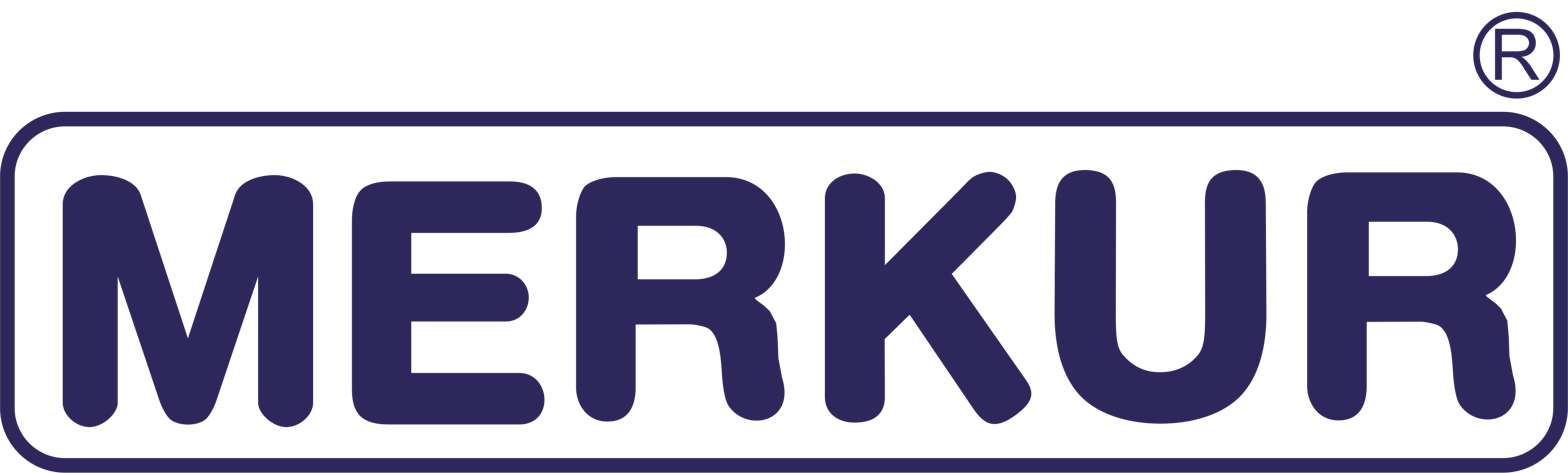
- Other names: Constructo, Build-O, Tecc
- Type: Construction set
- Inventor(s): Jaroslav Vancl
- Company: MERKUR TOYS s.r.o.
- Country: Czech Republic
- Availability: 1920; 105 years ago–present
- Materials: Steel
- Official website

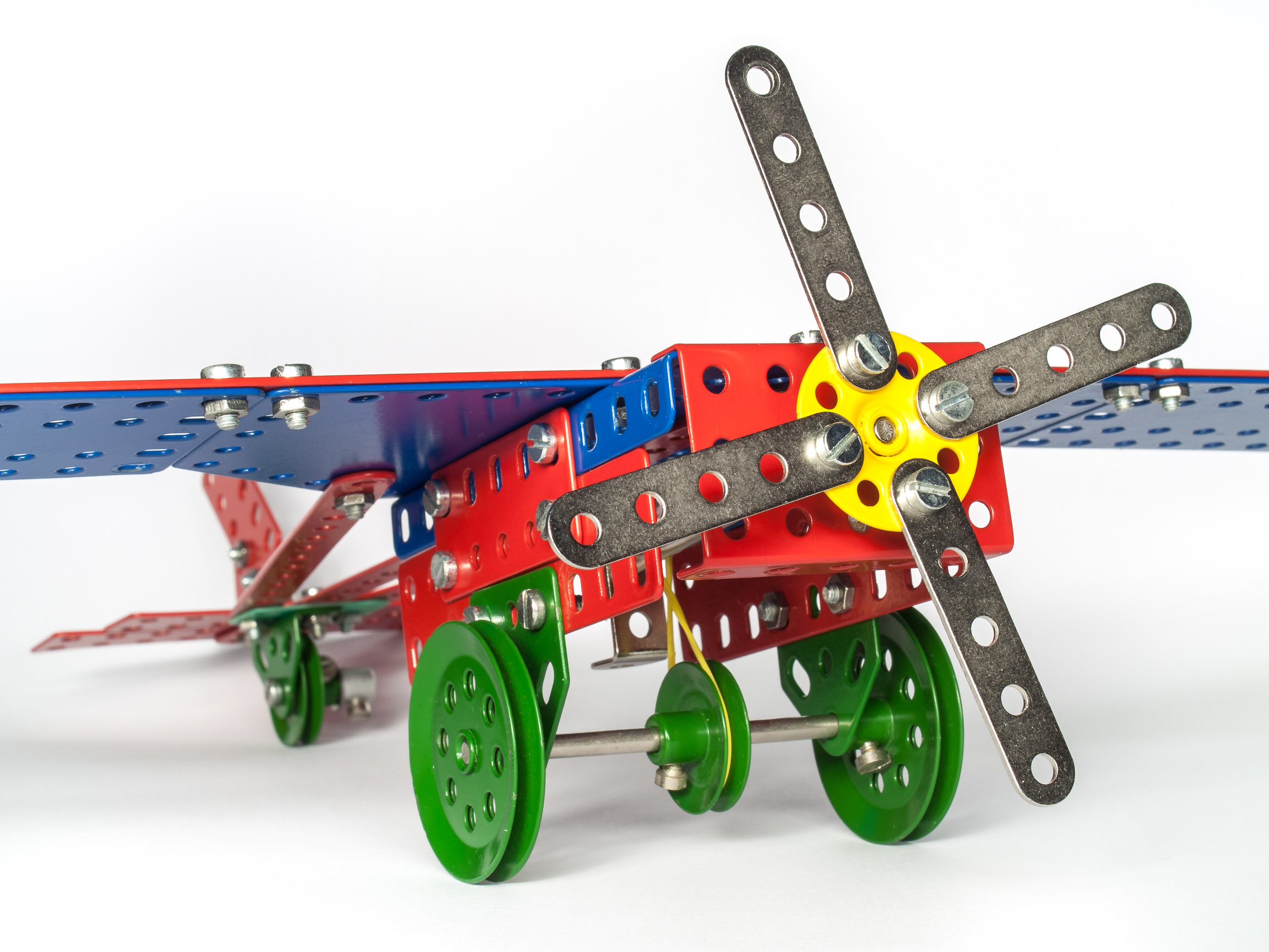
An Airplane built with the Merkur construction set

Merkur refers to a metal construction set built in Czechoslovakia (later the Czech Republic). It was also referred to as Constructo or Build-O in English-speaking countries and Tecc in the Netherlands.

Unlike Erector/Meccano, which was based on Imperial/customary measurements, Merkur used metric. There is 1×1 cm raster of connection holes on building parts, connected by M3.5 screws.

The brand was launched in 1920 and ran until 1940 when World War II put a halt to production. It was resumed in 1947. The private company was closed down and its assets nationalised by the Communist Czechoslovak state in 1953. The Merkur toys were made throughout the communist period and were exported all over Europe. The company was privatized by some of the former employees after 1989, but went into insolvency in 1993. Later on, Jaromír Kříž bought out the company and during three years he got back the production and saved this renowned Czech toy.

In 1961, Otto Wichterle used Merkur based apparatus for experimental production of the first soft contact lenses.

The factory and Merkur museum are located in Police nad Metují, Czech Republic.

Merkur also produces a wide range of toys, including metal 0 scale model trains and steam engines.
