= Wright Investors' Service Holdings, Inc. =

- Formerly: National Patent Development Corporation
- Company type: Holding company
- Industry: Investments
- Founded: 1960; 65 years ago
- Founders: Martin Pollak and Jerome Feldman
- Headquarters: Shelton, Connecticut, United States
- Products: Investing in inventions and patents and developing them
- Website: www.wrightinvestorsservice.com

Wright Investors' Service Holdings, formerly National Patent Development Corporation, is a United States private company (a Delaware corporation headquartered in Mount Kisco, New York) which is primarily a shell company. The initial aim was to invest in inventions and patents made in the USSR and other Eastern Bloc countries and commercialise them in the United States.

== History ==
National Patent Development Corporation (NPD) was based in New York City founded in 1959 by lawyers Martin Pollak and Jerome Feldman. It was incorporated in Delaware.

In 1961 Feldman and Pollak wrote a letter to Nikita Khrushchev proposing to buy US rights to inventions made in the USSR. The Soviet leadership agreed to cooperate and after three weeks in the USSR, NPD experts conferred with around 250 Soviet specialists and ultimately won patent rights to 14 inventions to be marketed in the United States by signing an agreement with Amtorg.

Using their Soviet connections, NPD then made inquiries in other Eastern bloc countries. In Czechoslovakia they met Otto Wichterle, the inventor of modern soft contact lenses. Then NPD bought the American rights to produce the lenses and sublicensed them to Bausch & Lomb which started to manufacture them in the USA.

In 1983, shares in National Patent Development reached $120, but sank to $48 in 1996. During the 1980s, the company had borrowed heavily to invest in products that were unsuccessful.

On December 19, 2012, NPD completed the merger of a wholly owned subsidiary of the company with and into The Winthrop Corporation.

In 2013, NPD renamed itself to Wright Investors' Service Holdings, Inc.

On July 17, 2018, Wright Investors' Service Holdings, Inc. (WISH) sold 100% of the issued and outstanding common stock of The Winthrop Corporation (Winthrop), a wholly owned subsidiary of WISH, to Khandwala Capital Management, Inc. Winthrop, through its wholly owned subsidiary Wright Investors' Service, Inc., is an investment management and financial advisory firm.

Wright Investors' Service Holdings has repeatedly offered to cede ownership of five dams in Connecticut, most recently to the town of Killingly, Connecticut in 2020. Some of the dams are over 200 years old. The state of Connecticut had refused to take over the dams six years prior, due to the projected repair and maintenance costs.
