= Vinyl ester resin =

Synthetic material

Vinyl ester resin, or often just vinyl ester, is a resin produced by the esterification of an epoxy resin with acrylic or methacrylic acids. The "vinyl" groups refer to the ester substituents, which are prone to polymerize and thus an inhibitor is usually added. The diester product is then dissolved in a reactive solvent, such as styrene, to approximately 35–45 percent content by weight. Polymerization is initiated by free radicals, which are generated by UV-irradiation or peroxides.

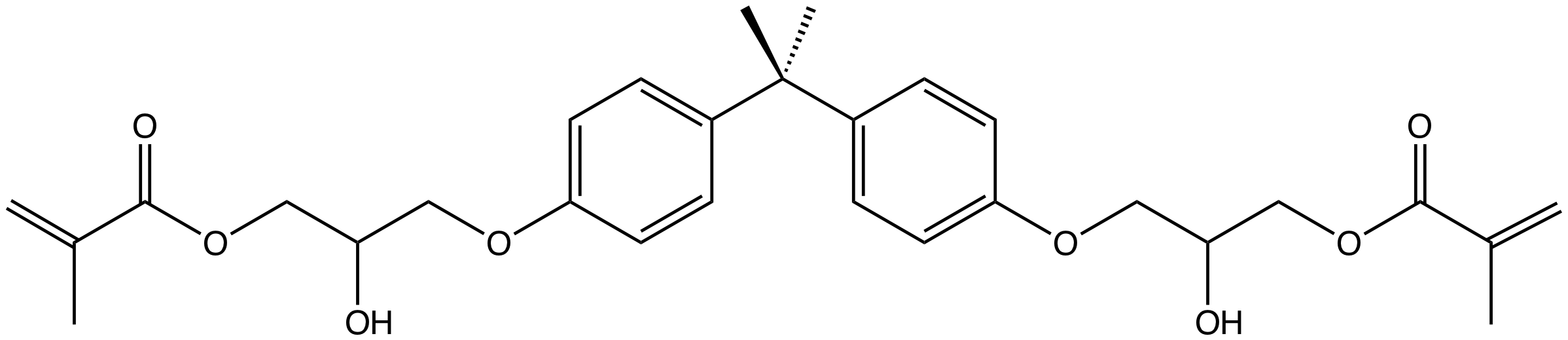
Bis-GMA, a typical "vinyl ester" derived from bisphenol A diglycidyl ether.

This thermoset material can be used as an alternative to polyester and epoxy materials as the thermoset polymer matrix in composite materials, where its characteristics, strengths, and bulk cost are intermediate between polyester and epoxy. Vinyl ester has lower resin viscosity (approx. 200 cps) than polyester (approx. 500 cps) and epoxy (approx. 900 cps).

== Uses ==
In homebuilt airplanes, the Glasair and Glastar kit planes made extensive use of vinyl ester fiberglass-reinforced structures. It is a common resin in the marine industry due to its corrosion resistance and ability to withstand water absorption. Vinyl ester resin is extensively used to manufacture FRP tanks and vessels as per BS4994. For laminating processes, vinyl ester is usually initiated with methyl ethyl ketone peroxide. It has greater strength and mechanical properties than polyester and less than epoxy resin.

Renewable precursors to vinyl ester resins have been developed.

Vinyl resins are often used in repair materials and laminating because they are waterproof and reliable.

Bisphenol A is a precursor in the production of multiple major classes of resins, including the vinyl ester resins along with epoxy resins and polycarbonate. This application usually begins with alkylation of BPA with epichlorohydrin.
