= Sun Odyssey 40 DS =

Sailboat class

Development
- Designer: Daniel Andrieu
- Location: France
- Year: 2000
- No. built: ~300
- Builder: Jeanneau
- Role: Cruiser
- Name: Sun Odyssey 40 DS

Boat
- Displacement: 16,380 lb (7,430 kg)
- Draft: 6.42 ft (1.96 m)

Hull
- Type: monohull
- Construction: fiberglass
- LOA: 40.00 ft (12.19 m)
- LWL: 33.33 ft (10.16 m)
- Beam: 13.00 ft (3.96 m)
- Engine: 39 hp (29 kW) diesel engine

Hull appendages
- Keel: fin keel with weighted bulb
- Ballast: 5,291 lb (2,400 kg)
- Rudder: spade-type rudder

Rig
- Rig type: Bermuda rig
- I foretriangle height: 49.75 ft (15.16 m)
- J foretriangle base: 13.92 ft (4.24 m)
- P mainsail luff: 42.83 ft (13.05 m)
- E mainsail foot: 15.75 ft (4.80 m)

Sails
- Sailplan: masthead sloop
- Mainsail area: 320 sq ft (30 m^{2})
- Jib/genoa area: 499 sq ft (46.4 m^{2})
- Spinnaker area: 1,163 sq ft (108.0 m^{2})
- Upwind sail area: 819 sq ft (76.1 m^{2})
- Downwind sail area: 1,482 sq ft (137.7 m^{2})

The Sun Odyssey 40 DS (Deck Salon) is a French sailboat that was designed by Daniel Andrieu as a cruiser and for the yacht charter role and was first built in 2000.

The boat uses the same hull design as the Sun Odyssey 40.

== Production ==
The design was built by Jeanneau in France, from 2000 to 2004, with about 300 boats completed, but it is now out of production.

== Design ==
The Sun Odyssey 40 DS is a recreational keelboat, built predominantly of fiberglass, with wood trim. It has a masthead sloop rig, with a deck-stepped mast, two sets of swept spreaders and aluminum spars with stainless steel wire rigging. The hull has a raked stem, a reverse transom with a swimming platform, an internally mounted spade-type rudder controlled by a single wheel and a fixed L-shaped fin keel with a weighted bulb or optional shoal-draft keel. The fin keel model displaces 16,380 lb (7,430 kg) and carries 5,291 lb (2,400 kg) of cast iron ballast, while the shoal draft version displaces 16,932 lb (7,680 kg) and carries 5,842 lb (2,650 kg) of cast iron ballast.

The boat has a draft of 6.42 ft (1.96 m) with the standard keel and 4.25 ft (1.30 m) with the optional shoal draft keel.

The boat is fitted with a diesel engine of 40 or 78 hp (30 or 58 kW) for docking and maneuvering. The fuel tank holds 48 U.S. gallons (180 L; 40 imp gal) and the fresh water tank has a capacity of 112 U.S. gallons (420 L; 93 imp gal).

The boat was built with three different interior layouts: a two-cabin, three cabin with one head and three-cabin with two heads. A typical three-cabin layout has sleeping accommodation for six people, with a double "V"-berth in the bow cabin, a U-shaped settee and two seats in the main cabin and two aft cabins, each with a double berth. The two-cabin layout omits the aft starboard cabin. The galley is located on the starboard side at the companionway ladder. The galley is L-shaped and is equipped with a two-burner stove, an ice box and a double sink. There are two heads, one just aft of the bow cabin on the starboard side and one on the port side in the aft cabin. Cabin maximum headroom is 81 in (206 cm).

For sailing downwind the design may be equipped with a symmetrical spinnaker of 1,163 sq ft (108.0 m^{2}).

The design has a hull speed of 7.74 kn (14.33 km/h).

== Operational history ==
In a 2000 review naval architect Robert Perry wrote, "The interior in plan form is conventional with a double berth forward, double quarter berth aft and two heads. There is the option of a single quarter berth to starboard just aft of the galley. It's a comfortable-looking layout that, from what I can see in the drawings, does not have a chart table. The small seats with table to port could work well as a nav station. The conventional interior is encapsulated in an unconventional deck. If you find the large, raised cabinhouse awkward to the eye, hold judgment until you step below and see the benefits of this wraparound, glass-type house. I'm not crazy about stocky-looking cabinhouses, but I think the light and visibility below will make up for the challenging aesthetics ... There are two cockpits available. You can have the cockpit with the wheel mounted catamaran- and powerboat-style on the aft face of the cabintrunk, or you can go with a pedestal-type wheel in the center of the cockpit. The advantage of the bulkhead-mounted wheel is that this leaves the rest of the cockpit wide open. With the wheel forward, the helmsman will also get some protection from the raised cabinhouse. Given the performance look of this hull, I would prefer to sail this boat from a wheel aft so that I could move from side to side depending upon which tack I was on."

== See also ==
- List of sailing boat types
