= Acrylic resin =

Thermoplastic or thermosetting plastic

Polyhydroxyethylmethacrylate is a typical acrylate resin.

An acrylic resin is a thermoplastic or thermosetting plastic substance typically derived from acrylic acid, methacrylic acid and acrylate monomers such as butyl acrylate and methacrylate monomers such as methyl methacrylate. Thermoplastic acrylics designate a group of acrylic resins typically containing both a high molecular weight and a high glass transition temperature which exhibit lacquer dry capability. Acrylic resins designed for use in two component systems for crosslinking with isocyanate are referred to as polyols and are made with the monomers previously mentioned as well as hydroxy monomers such as hydroxy ethyl methacrylate. Acrylic resins are produced in different liquid carriers such as a hydrocarbon solvent (solventborne acrylics or solution acrylics solventborne acrylic selector) or water in which case they are referred to as emulsions or dispersions and they are also provided in 100% solids bead form.

One example is polyhydroxyethylmethacrylate (pHEMA), which makes a crosslinked polymer when treated with polyisocyanates. Such materials are a useful component in some paints.

== Advantages as an ingredient in paint ==
Acrylic resin is a common ingredient in latex paint (UK: "emulsion paint"). Latex paints with a greater proportion of acrylic resin offer better stain protection, greater water resistance, better adhesion, greater resistance to cracking and blistering, and resistance to alkali cleaners compared to those with vinyl. Acrylic resin is considered extremely weatherproof and is well-suited for outdoor applications. In solid form, acrylic resin can last for decades. It does not yellow when exposed to sunlight, even after many years. Acrylic resins are the materials which when added to latex increases its gloss properties, mechanical durability (i.e. scratch resistance) and improves the gloss over vinyl-only resins.

== Microbial degradation ==
Melanin-producing Cladosporium fungi damaged dried acrylic resin samples in the Milan Cathedral.

== See also ==
- Acrylic fiber
- Acrylic rubber
