= Otto Wichterle =

Czech chemist and inventor (1913–1998)

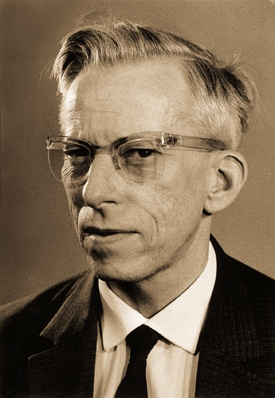
- Prof. Otto Wichterle
- Born: 27 October 1913; Prostějov, Moravia, Austria-Hungary
- Died: 18 August 1998 (aged 84); Stražisko, Czech Republic
- Education: Czech Technical University in Prague
- Spouse: Linda Wichterlová (m. 1938)

Signature
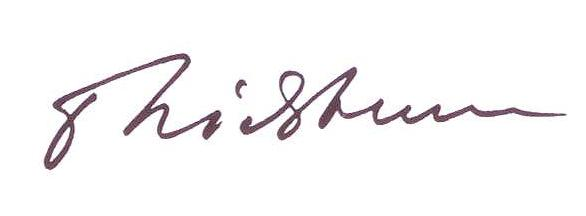

Otto Wichterle (Czech pronunciation: [ˈoto ˈvɪxtr̩lɛ]; 27 October 1913 – 18 August 1998) was a Czech chemist, best known for his invention of modern soft contact lenses.

Wichterle was the author or co-author of approximately 180 patents and over 200 publications. The studies and independent books covered various aspects of organic, inorganic and macromolecular chemistry, polymer science, and biomedical materials. He held a higher number of patents for organic synthesis, polymerization, fibres, the synthesis and shaping of biomedical materials, production methods and measuring devices related to biomedical products. This was typical of his attitude to scientific research, which, he considered, ought to serve society and its requirements by any means possible, without distinction as to "pure" and "applied" science.

== Schooling and chemistry background ==
Wichterle's father, Karel, was co-owner of a successful farm-machine factory and small car plant, but Otto chose science for his career. After finishing high school (today's Wolker Grammar School) in Prostějov, Wichterle began to study at the Chemical and Technological Faculty of the Czech Technical University (now the independent University of Chemistry and Technology, Prague) but he was also interested in medicine. He graduated in 1936, and stayed at the university. In 1939, he submitted his second doctorate thesis on chemistry, but the Protectorate regime blocked any further activity at the university. However, Wichterle was able to join the research institute at Baťa's works in Zlín and continue his scientific work.

At Baťa's institute Wichterle led the technical preparation of plastics, namely polyamide and caprolactam. In 1941, Wichterle's team invented the procedure to throw and spool polyamide thread, thus making the first Czechoslovak synthetic fiber under the name silon (the invention came independently of the original American nylon procedure in 1938). Wichterle was imprisoned by the Gestapo in 1942 but was released after a few months.

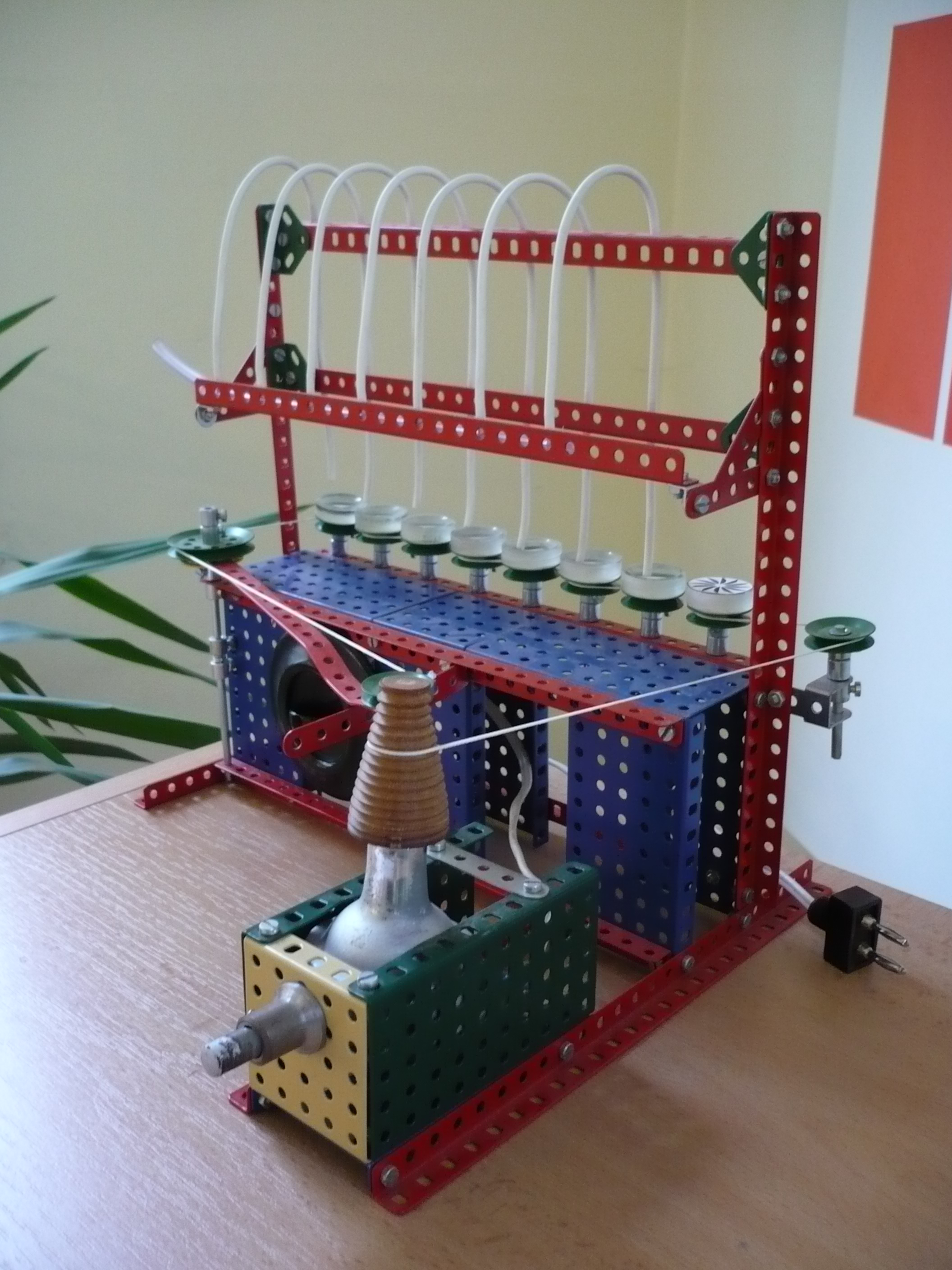
Merkur-based apparatus for centrifugal casting of contact lenses

After World War II, Wichterle returned to the university, specializing in organic chemistry, and was active in teaching general and inorganic chemistry. He wrote an inorganic chemistry textbook, the concept of which was ahead of its time, and also wrote a German and Czech organic chemistry textbook. In 1949 he expanded his second doctorate with the technology of plastics and devoted himself fully to the establishment of a new department of plastics technology.

== Contact lenses ==
=== Prototype development ===
In 1952, he was made dean of the newly established Institute of Chemical Technology in Prague. From that time on, Wichterle devoted himself to studying the synthesis of cross-linking hydrophilous gels, with the aim of finding a material suitable for use in permanent contact with living tissues. Wichterle accepted the help of one of his colleagues, Drahoslav Lím, and together they succeeded in preparing a cross-linking gel which absorbed up to 40% water, exhibited suitable mechanical properties and was transparent. This new material was the Poly(2-hydroxyethyl methacrylate) (pHEMA), that they patented in 1953. Wichterle thought pHEMA might be a suitable material for contact lenses and gained his first patent for soft contact lenses. In 1954 this material was first used as an orbital implant. In 1957 Wichterle produced around 100 soft lenses from closed polystyrene molds but the edges split and tore as the lenses were removed. In addition, they required hand finishing. He was determined to find a better way. Unfortunately, Wichterle and other prominent teachers had to leave the Institute of Chemical Technology after a political purge staged by its Communist leadership in 1958. Research into contact eye lenses at the Institute of Chemical Technology came to an end. The International Symposium on Macromolecular Chemistry held in Prague in 1957 convinced the state leadership of the need to establish a centre for research into synthetic polymers. The Institute of Macromolecular Chemistry of the Czechoslovak Academy of Sciences (CSAS) came into being in 1958, with Professor Wichterle appointed its director. Since the institute's building was under construction at that time, Professor Wichterle conducted the decisive experiments to transform hydrogels into a suitable contact lens shape at his home.

=== Early models ===
By late 1961 Wichterle succeeded in producing the first four hydrogel contact lenses on a home-made apparatus built using a children's building kit (Merkur), a bicycle dynamo belonging to one of his sons, and a bell transformer. Wichterle also made all the moulds and glass tubing needed to dose them with monomer. On Christmas afternoon, with the help of his wife Linda, using the machine on his kitchen table, Wichterle finally succeeded. He tried the lenses in his own eyes and although they were the wrong power they were comfortable. Thus, he invented a new way of manufacturing the lenses using a centrifugal casting procedure. A few days later, he completed his patent application and produced over 100 lenses by spin casting. He built several new prototype machines using Merkur toys, with increasing numbers of spindles which required the stronger motor taken from his gramophone. With these rudimentary devices, in the first four months of 1962, Wichterle and Linda made 5,500 lenses. The early experimental lenses were called Geltakt and the later production lenses Spofalens after the state enterprise SPOFA which manufactured them.

=== Patent ===
In 1965 National Patent Development Corporation (NPDC) bought the American rights to produce the lenses and then sublicensed the rights to Bausch & Lomb which started to manufacture them in the USA. In 1977 the patents were challenged, mainly by Continuous Curve Contact Lenses. Because of this, in May 1977 the Czechoslovak Academy of Sciences sold these patents to avoid any liability, if the court case failed. However, Wichterle and NPDC won the court case in 1983.

== Later recognition and Czechoslovakia reform ==
Wichterle came to be well-known beyond the frontiers of his country not only through his achievements but also because of his activities in international organizations, chief among which was the International Union of Pure and Applied Chemistry (IUPAC). He took part in the preparations for its Prague symposia in 1957 and 1965, which were much applauded by participants; he had a hand in the inauguration of its fifth, macromolecular, division, of which he was to become the first president, and he gained further credit by combining within it what were for normal administrative purposes the separate fields of pure and applied chemistry.

In 1970, Wichterle was expelled again from his position in the institute, this time for signing "The Two Thousand Words"—a manifesto asking for the continuation of the democratization process begun in 1968 during the Prague Spring. Punishment by the regime included removing him from his executive positions and making his research more and more difficult mainly by cutting off contacts from abroad and limiting his teaching opportunities. Full recognition did not come until the Velvet Revolution in 1989. In 1990, he was made president of the Czechoslovak Academy of Sciences till the dissolution of Czechoslovakia and was the honorary president of the Academy of Sciences of the Czech Republic after that.

== Honors and achievements ==
Wichterle was a member of a number of foreign academies of science, he received many awards and honorary doctorates from several universities.

- In 1991, Otto Wichterle was awarded honorary doctoral degrees from the University of Illinois at Chicago and from the Polytechnic University in Brooklyn, NY.
- The asteroid number 3899 was named after Wichterle in 1993.
- A prestigious secondary school in Ostrava (in the district of Poruba) in the Czech Republic was named after him on 1 September 2006.
- On 27 October 2021, Google celebrated Wichterle's 108th birth anniversary with a doodle on its homepage.

The Otto Wichterle Award, given by the Czech Academy of Sciences each year, is named after him. The award is given to nominees with scientific degrees and are no older than 35 in the calendar year of the submission. It is given to individuals who have made 'remarkable contributions to the advancement of scientific knowledge in a given area of science'.

== Publications ==
- Allgemeine organische Chemie, Berlin : Akademie-Verlag, 1955, 2nd ext. ed. 1959
