= Functionalized polyolefins =

Polymers with polar and nonpolar functionalities

Functionalized polyolefins are olefin polymers with polar and nonpolar functionalities attached onto the polymer backbone. There has been an increased interest in functionalizing polyolefins due to their increased usage in everyday life. Polyolefins are virtually ubiquitous in everyday life, from consumer food packaging to biomedical applications; therefore, efforts must be made to study catalytic pathways towards the attachment of various functional groups onto polyolefins in order to affect the material's physical properties.

Based on the polyolefin structure, functionalized polyolefin can be categorized into four main groups: randomly functionalized polyolefins, end-functionalized polyolefins, block polyolefins, and graft polyolefins.

== Randomly functionalized polyolefin ==
Randomly functionalized polyolefins have differing types, location, and amount of functionality on the polyolefin backbone. Randomly functionalized polyolefins can be synthesized through many familiar combination of polymerization techniques including: post-functionalization, ROMP/hydrogenation, ADMET/hydrogenation, radical polymerization, and catalytic copolymerization.

=== Post-functionalization ===
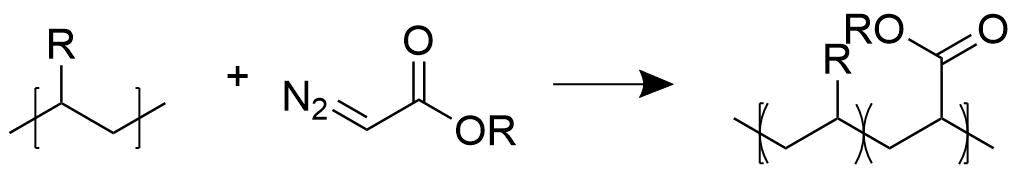
Carbene insertion

Post-functionalization of polyolefin occurs as the name suggests: functionalization occurs after a non-functionalized polyolefin is synthesized. One of the most common way to attach functionality onto a preexisting polymer backbone is through free radical reaction. Free radicals can be formed through plasma, peroxide initiation, etc. When there is a free radical on the polyolefin chain, maleic anhydride can be attached to promote further functionalization. Another approach is through direct insertion of carbenes onto the polyolefin backbone. Though post-functionalization techniques are viable for the insertion of functional groups, harsh conditions must be used since regular non-functionalized polyolefins are highly unreactive.

=== Ring-opening metathesis polymerization (ROMP) ===
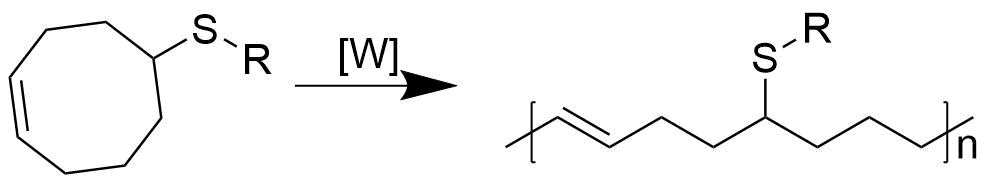
Tungsten complex catalyzed ring-opening metathesis polymerization

Ring-opening metathesis polymerization (ROMP) must occur first followed by hydrogenation of the opened product. For example, functionalized cyclooctenes can result in functionalized polyolefins via ruthenium complex catalyzed ROMP. Copolymers of ethyl and vinyl acetate can be synthesized via this process. First, a cycloctene functionalized with an ester functionality at the position 5 carbon reacts with a ruthenium complex. Next, the resulting open-ringed product is treated with hydrazine to hydrogenate the double bond resulting in ethane and vinyl acetate copolymer.

=== Acyclic diene metathesis (ADMET) ===
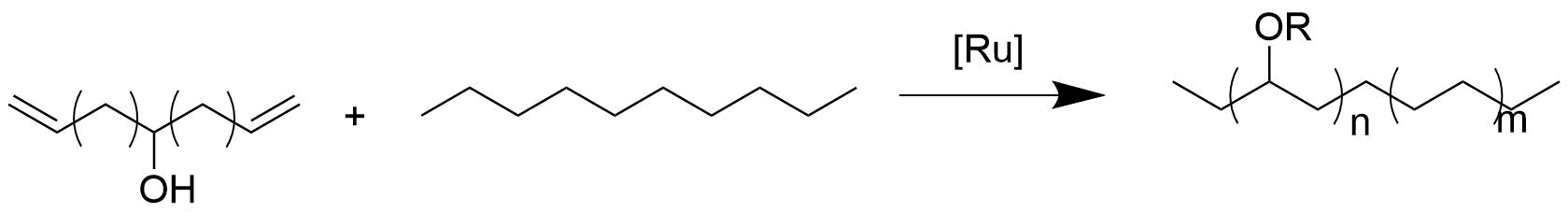
ADMET copolymerization with Ru catalyst

Acyclic diene metathesis (ADMET) is similar to ROMP in that subsequent hydrogenation is required. ADMET requires a certain type of diene in order for the polymerization to occur. Ruthenium complexes can once again be used for ADMET polymerization. In this case, an α,ω-diene monomer with functionality is required.

=== Radical polymerization ===
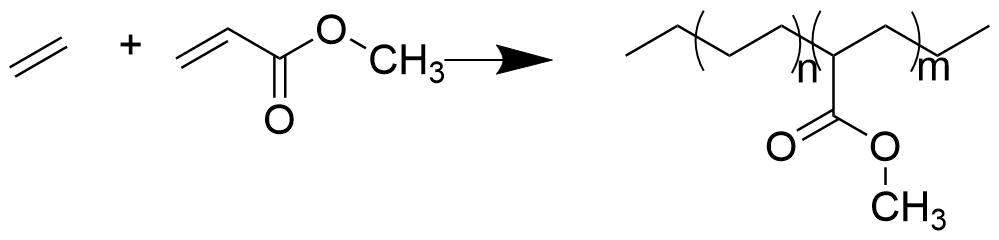
Copolymer via radical polymerization

Radical polymerization occurs with an olefin and a vinyl monomer. Since olefins are not very reactive, harsh conditions must be met in order for the polymerization to occur. Ethylene and ethyl acrylate can react together to perform free radical polymerization. In this process, boron trifluoride can be used as the protected group for the ethyl acrylate.

=== Catalytic polymerization ===
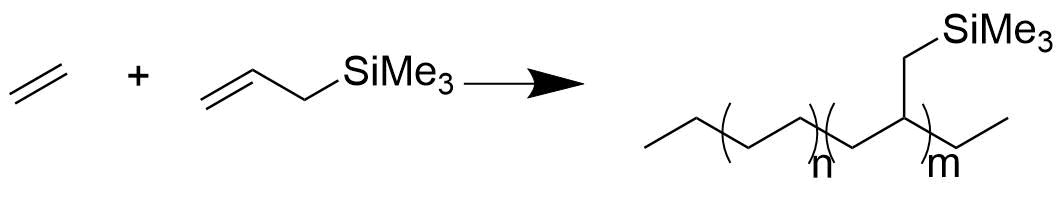
TMS functionalized polyolefin via Ti complex catalysis

Catalytic polymerization appears to have the most control compared to other polymerization methods for randomly functionalized polyolefins. Catalytic routes predominantly undergo a coordination/migratory insertion pathway. The functionality of the olefin highly affects the reactivity of the olefin, and hence its relative rate of coordination. Examples of early transition metal catalysts includes titanium and zirconium complexes. Early transition metals can easily form oxides; therefore, protection groups, like the use of methylaluminoxane (MAO) due to its Lewis acidity, can be used to prevent side reactions from happening. As a cocatalyst, MAO is well known for their use in metallocene chemistry as they activate metallocene complexes for olefin polymerization. To remove the MAO protecting group, the reaction can be treated with acid. Instead of MAO, trimethylsilyl (TMS) have also been used to protection functional groups such as amine, since the amine functionality can easily react with other olefins to form branched polymer chains.

Another useful reaction is the use of zirconium metallocene complexes to copolymerize olefin with borane monomer. After reaction with a borane monomer, such as 9-borabicyclonoane (9-BBN), subsequent functionalization can result in hydroxyl functionalities.

Turning from early transition metals to late transition metals, palladium and nickel catalysts have been used to copolymerize ethylene and methylacrylate.

== End functionalized polyolefin ==
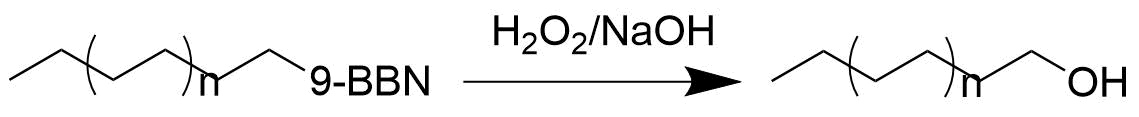
End functionalized BBN oxidation

End functionalized polyolefins are polyolefin with functionality either at one end or at both ends of the chain. One example of end functionalization is through living polymerization. Using a vanadium terminated polypropene chain, subsequent reaction with carbon monoxide and acid can result in an aldehyde terminated polypropene chain. This reaction moves forward under low temperature conditions (~-78 °C). Through metallocene supported polymerization, chain transfer can occur with the use of a borane chain transfer agent, which results in an end functionalized polymer chain. One advantage of this chain transfer process is the limited use of metals, which decreases cost.

== Block and graft polyolefin ==
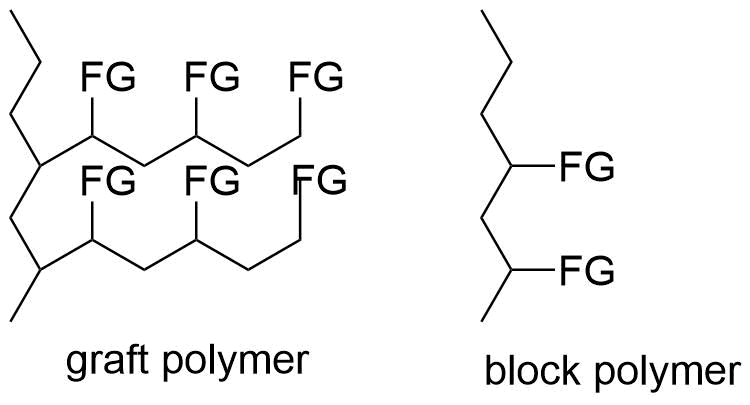
Graft vs block chain

Block and graft polyolefin can provide high amount of functional groups onto the polymer chain. Synthesis of both block and graft functionalized polyolefin proceed through a combination of polymerization reactions, most notably via coordination/insertion mechanism and radical polymerization. Some disadvantages of this method include the lack of controlled polymerization and the requirement of multi-step mechanisms.
