= Epichlorohydrin =

(±)-Epichlorohydrin
- Epichlorohydrin skeletal structure

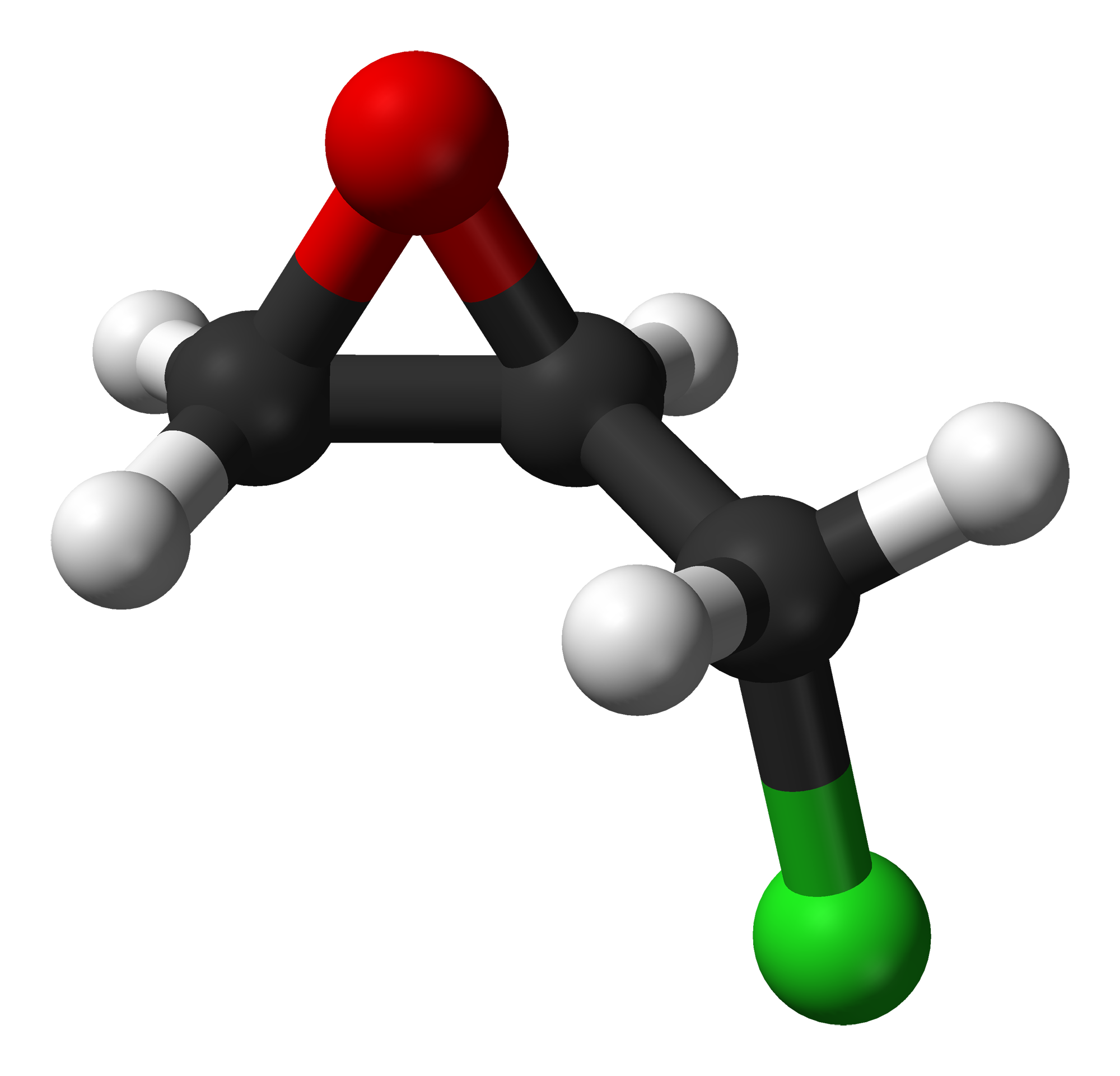
(R)-Epichlorohydrin
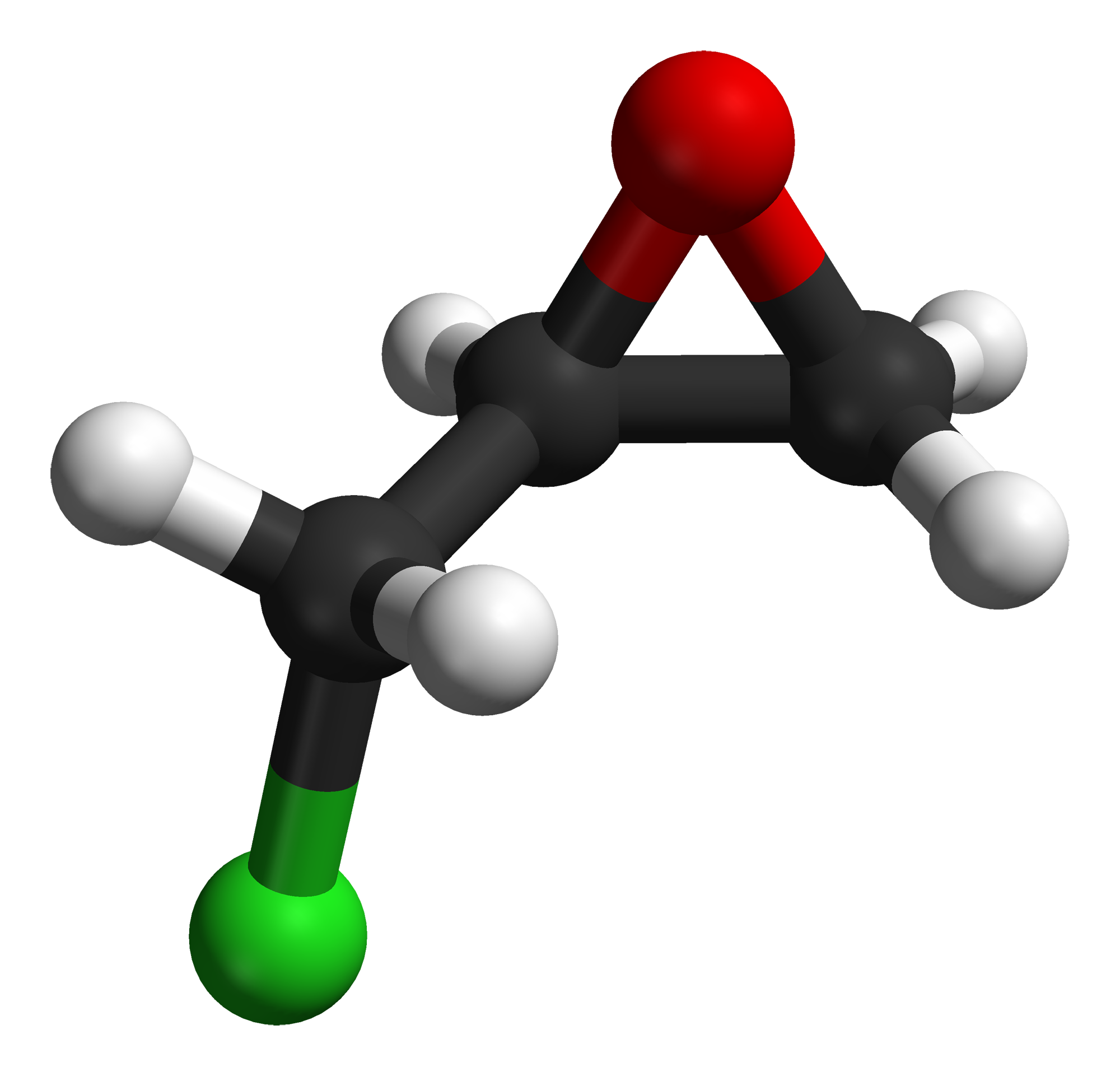
(S)-Epichlorohydrin

Names
- Preferred IUPAC name 2-(Chloromethyl)oxirane
- Other names (Chloromethyl)oxirane; Epichlorohydrin; 1-Chloro-2,3-epoxypropane γ-Chloropropylene oxide Glycidyl chloride ECH

Identifiers
CAS Number	106-89-8
3D model (JSmol)	Interactive image
Beilstein Reference	79785
ChEBI	CHEBI:37144
ChEMBL	ChEMBL1421613
ChemSpider	13837112
ECHA InfoCard	100.003.128
EC Number	203-439-8
Gmelin Reference	164180
KEGG	C14449
PubChem CID	7835
RTECS number	TX4900000
UNII	08OOR508C0
UN number	2023
CompTox Dashboard (EPA)	DTXSID1020566
- InChI: InChI=1S/C3H5ClO/c4-1-3-2-5-3/h3H,1-2H2 Key: BRLQWZUYTZBJKN-UHFFFAOYSA-N; InChI=1/C3H5ClO/c4-1-3-2-5-3/h3H,1-2H2 Key: BRLQWZUYTZBJKN-UHFFFAOYAY
- SMILES: ClCC1CO1

Properties
Chemical formula	C_{3}H_{5}ClO
Molar mass	92.52 g/mol
Appearance	colorless liquid
Odor	garlic or chloroform-like
Density	1.1812 g/cm^{3}
Melting point	−25.6 °C (−14.1 °F; 247.6 K)
Boiling point	117.9 °C (244.2 °F; 391.0 K)
Solubility in water	7% (20°C)
Vapor pressure	13 mmHg (20°C)

Hazards
- GHS labelling
Pictograms	(GHS02: Flammable) (GHS05: Corrosive) (GHS06: Toxic) (GHS07: Exclamation mark) (GHS08: Health hazard)
Signal word	Danger
Hazard statements	H226, H301, H311, H314, H317, H331, H350
Precautionary statements	P201, P202, P210, P233, P240, P241, P242, P243, P260, P264, P270, P271, P272, P280, P281, P301+P310, P301+P330+P331, P302+P352, P303+P361+P353, P304+P340, P305+P351+P338, P308+P313, P310, P311, P312, P321, P322, P330, P333+P313, P361, P363, P370+P378, P403+P233, P403+P235, P405, P501
NFPA 704 (fire diamond)	3 3 2
Flash point	32 °C (90 °F; 305 K)
Explosive limits	3.8–21%
- Lethal dose or concentration (LD, LC)
LC_{50} (median concentration)	3617 ppm (rat, 1 hr); 2165 ppm (rat, 1 hr); 250 ppm (rat, 8 hr); 244 ppm (rat, 8 hr); 360 ppm (rat, 6 hr)
LC_{Lo} (lowest published)	250 ppm (rat, 4 hr)
- NIOSH (US health exposure limits)
PEL (Permissible)	TWA 5 ppm (19 mg/m^{3}) [skin]
REL (Recommended)	Carcinogen
IDLH (Immediate danger)	Ca [75 ppm]
Safety data sheet (SDS)	External MSDS
- Except where otherwise noted, data are given for materials in their standard state (at 25 °C [77 °F], 100 kPa). verify (what is ?) Infobox references

Epichlorohydrin (abbreviated ECH) is an organochlorine compound and an epoxide. Despite its name, it is not a halohydrin. It is a colorless liquid with a pungent, garlic-like odor, moderately soluble in water, but miscible with most polar organic solvents. It is a chiral molecule generally existing as a racemic mixture of right-handed and left-handed enantiomers. Epichlorohydrin is a highly reactive electrophilic compound and is used in the production of glycerol, plastics, epoxy glues and resins, epoxy diluents and elastomers.

== Production ==
Epichlorohydrin is traditionally manufactured from allyl chloride in two steps, beginning with the addition of hypochlorous acid, which affords a mixture of two isomeric alcohols:

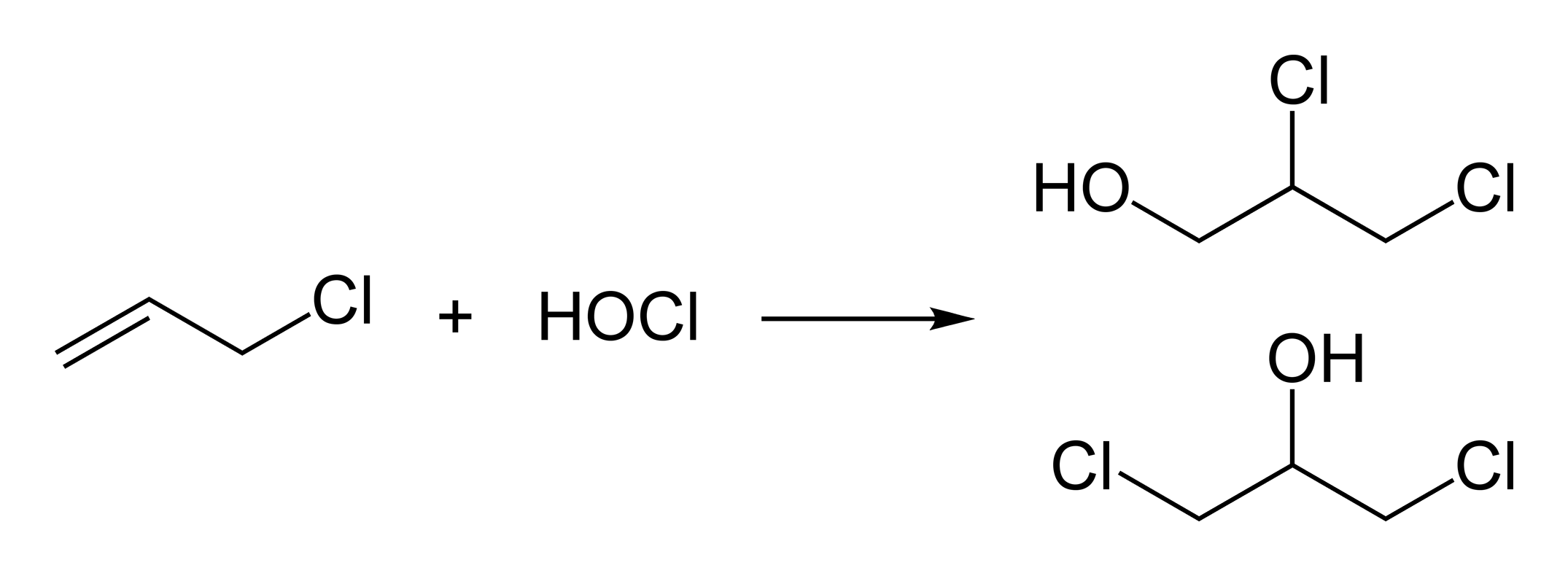

In the second step, this mixture is treated with base to give the epoxide:

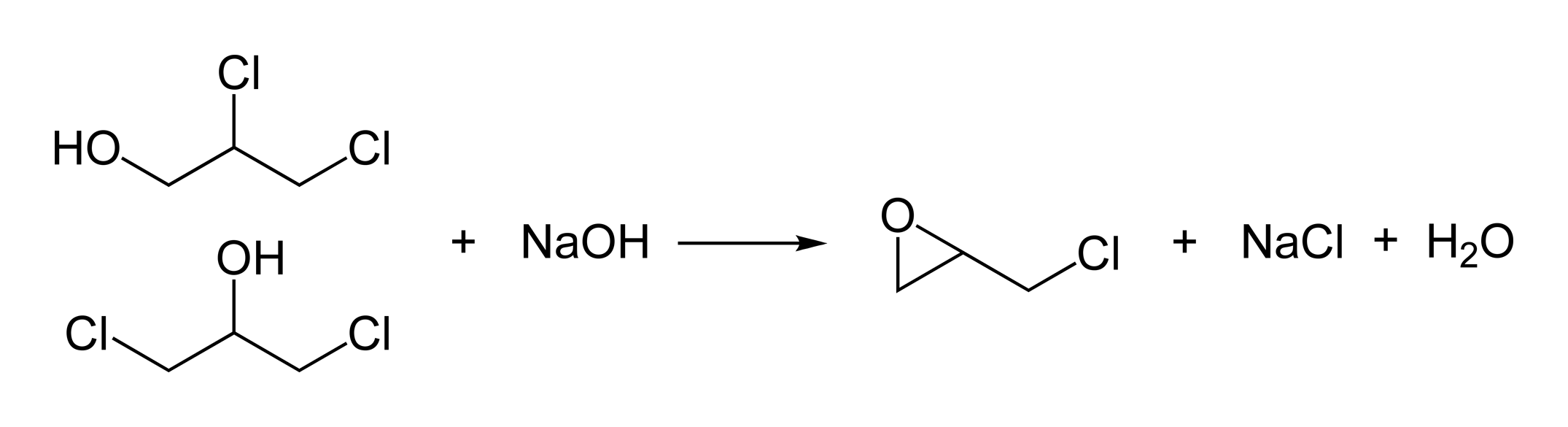

In this way, more than 800,000 tons (1997) of epichlorohydrin are produced annually.

=== Glycerol routes ===
Epichlorohydrin was first described in 1848 by Marcellin Berthelot. The compound was isolated during studies on reactions between glycerol and gaseous hydrogen chloride.

Reminiscent of Berthelot's experiment, glycerol-to-epichlorohydrin (GTE) plants have been commercialized. This technology capitalizes on the availability of cheap glycerol from biofuels processing. In the process developed by Dow Chemical, glycerol undergoes two substitution reactions when treated with hydrogen chloride in the presence of a carboxylic acid catalyst. This is the same intermediate formed in the allyl chloride/hypochlorous acid process, and is likewise then treated with base to form epichlorohydrin.

=== Other routes ===
Routes that involve fewer chlorinated intermediates have continued to attract interest. One such process entails epoxidation of allyl chloride.

== Applications ==
=== Glycerol and epoxy resins synthesis ===
Epichlorohydrin is mainly converted to bisphenol A diglycidyl ether, a building block in the manufacture of epoxy resins. It is also a precursor to monomers for other resins and polymers. Another usage is the conversion to synthetic glycerol. However, the rapid increase in biodiesel production, where glycerol is a waste product, has led to a glut of glycerol on the market, rendering this process uneconomical. Synthetic glycerol is now used only in sensitive pharmaceutical, and biotech applications where quality standards are very high.

=== Minor and niche applications ===
Epichlorohydrin is a versatile precursor in the synthesis of many organic compounds. For example, it is converted to glycidyl nitrate, an energetic binder used in explosive and propellant compositions. The epichlorohydrin is reacted with an alkali nitrate, such as sodium nitrate, producing glycidyl nitrate and alkali chloride. It is used as a solvent for cellulose, resins, and paints, and it has found use as an insect fumigant.

Polymers made from epichlorohydrin, e.g., polyamide-epichlorohydrin resins, are used in paper reinforcement and in the food industry to manufacture tea bags, coffee filters, and sausage/salami casings as well as with water purification.

An important biochemical application of epichlorohydrin is its use as crosslinking agent for the production of Sephadex size-exclusion chromatographic resins from dextrans.

== Safety ==
Epichlorohydrin is classified by several international health research agencies and groups as a probable or likely carcinogen in humans. Prolonged oral consumption of high levels of epichlorohydrin could result in stomach problems and an increased risk of cancer. Occupational exposure to epichlorohydrin via inhalation could result in lung irritation and an increased risk of lung cancer.

=== Regulation in the United States ===
After the Safe Drinking Water Act in 1974 the EPA began regulating a large group of chemicals including Epichlorohydrin. The bill required the EPA to establish safe chemical limits in drinking water, the EPA set the goal for Epichlorohydrin at zero to prevent health hazards linked to exposure from the chemical.

The Department of Transportation considers Epichlorohydrin to be a hazardous material and marine pollutant. However, minimum requirements have been made for safe transport on ships and barges.
