= Methacrylate =

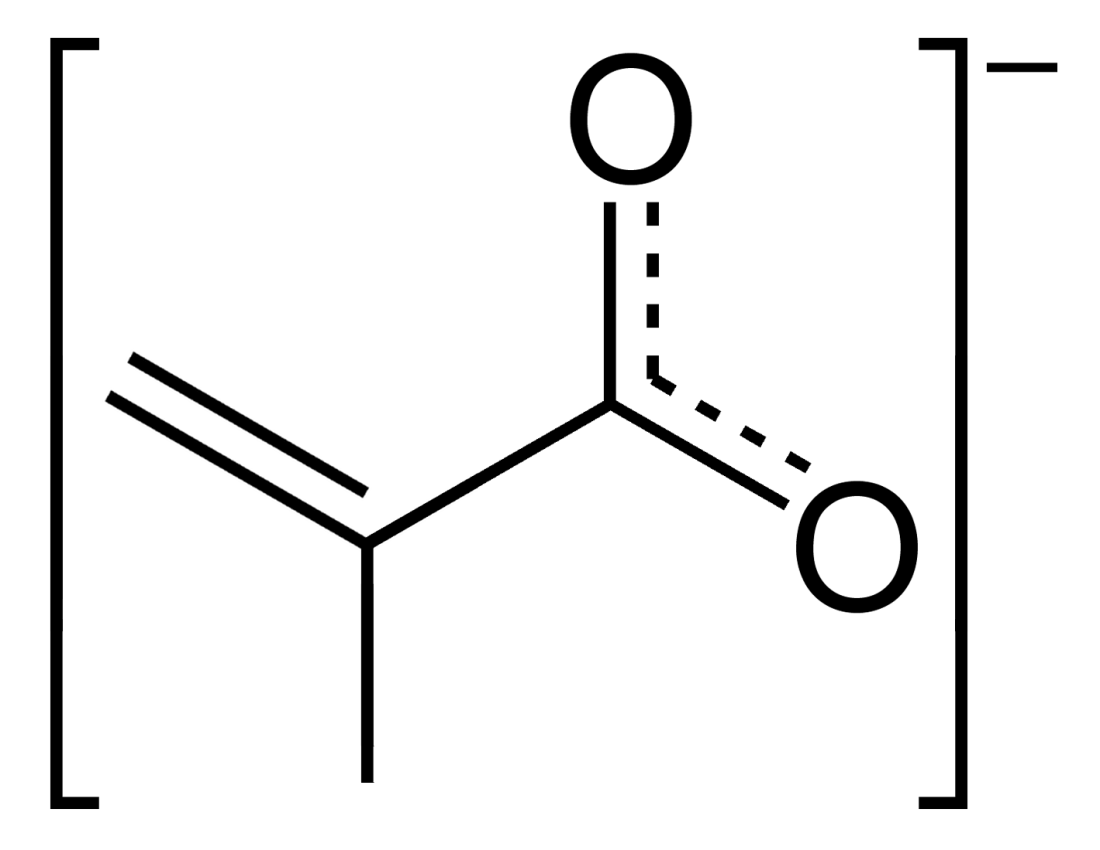
Methacrylate ion

Methacrylates are derivatives of methacrylic acid. These derivatives are mainly used to make poly(methyl methacrylate) and related polymers.

- Monomers
  - Methyl methacrylate
  - Ethyl methacrylate
  - Butyl methacrylate
  - Hydroxyethyl methacrylate
  - Glycidyl methacrylate
