= Robert Waymouth =

American chemist

Robert M. Waymouth (born 1960) is an American chemist. He is the Robert Eckles Swain Professor in Chemistry at Stanford University.

== Early life and education ==
He was born in 1960 in Warner Robins, Georgia. In 1982 he earned a B.S. in chemistry and a B.A. in mathematics from Washington and Lee University. He received a PhD in chemistry from the California Institute of Technology in 1987 and did postdoctoral research at the Institut fur Polymere in Zürich, Switzerland.

== Career ==
He became an assistant professor at Stanford in 1988 and a full professor in 1997. In 2000 he was named the Robert Eckles Swain Professor of Chemistry. He heads the Waymouth Group, which applies mechanistic principles to develop new concepts in catalysis. He has a particular interest in the disposal and recycling of plastics.
