= Methyl methacrylate =

Organic monomer

- Methyl methacrylate

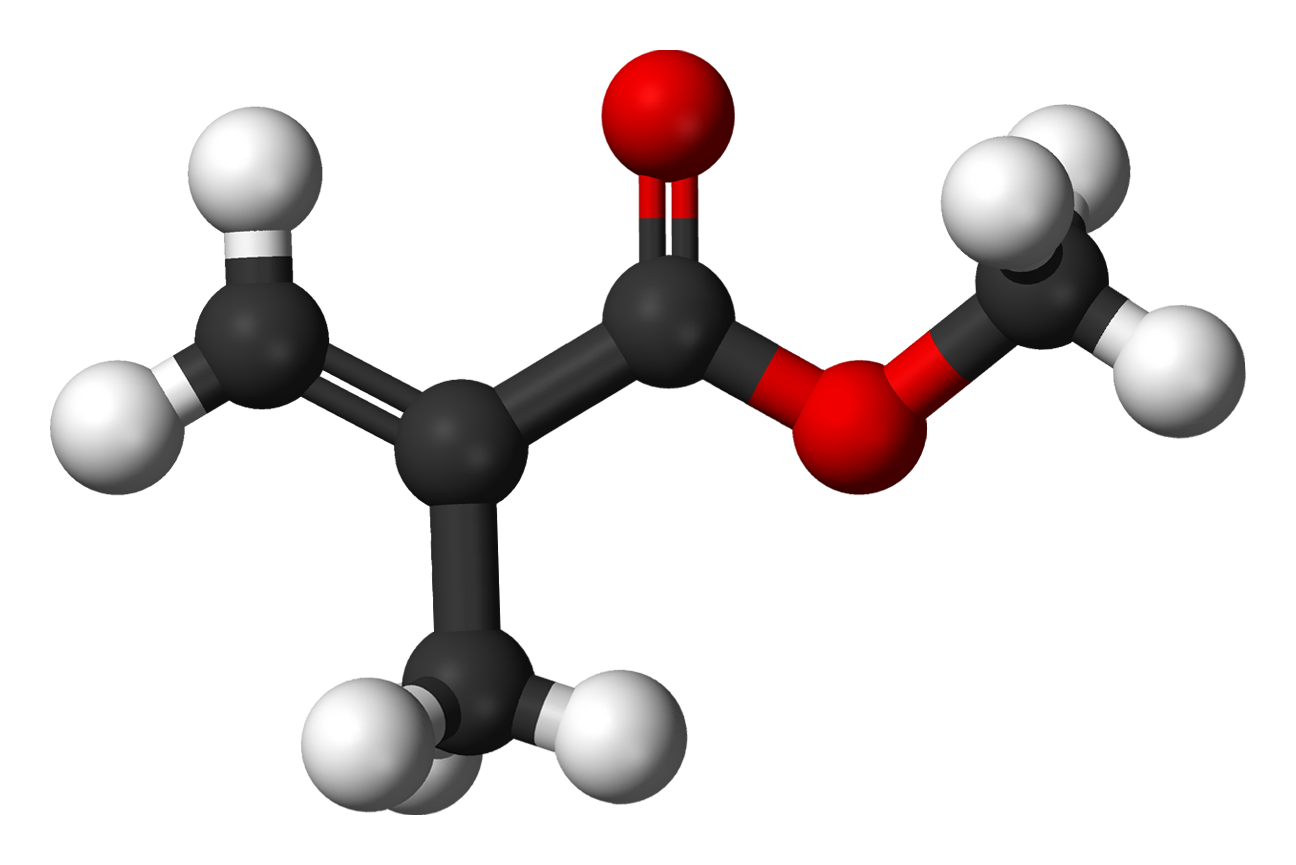

Names
- Preferred IUPAC name Methyl 2-methylprop-2-enoate
- Other names Methyl 2-methylpropenoate methyl methacrylate MMA; 2-(methoxycarbonyl)-1-propene

Identifiers
CAS Number	80-62-6
3D model (JSmol)	Interactive image
Beilstein Reference	605459
ChEBI	CHEBI:34840
ChEMBL	ChEMBL49996
ChemSpider	6406
ECHA InfoCard	100.001.180
EC Number	201-297-1
Gmelin Reference	2691
KEGG	C14527
PubChem CID	6658
RTECS number	OZ5075000
UNII	196OC77688
UN number	1247 (MSDS)
CompTox Dashboard (EPA)	DTXSID2020844
- InChI: InChI=1S/C5H8O2/c1-4(2)5(6)7-3/h1H2,2-3H3 Key: VVQNEPGJFQJSBK-UHFFFAOYSA-N
- SMILES: O=C(OC)C(=C)C

Properties
Chemical formula	C_{5}H_{8}O_{2}
Molar mass	100.117 g·mol^{−1}
Appearance	Colorless liquid
Odor	acrid, fruity
Density	0.94 g/cm^{3}
Melting point	−48 °C (−54 °F; 225 K)
Boiling point	101 °C (214 °F; 374 K)
Solubility in water	1.5 g/100 ml
log P	1.38 (Inchem CICADS)
Vapor pressure	29 mmHg (20 °C)
Magnetic susceptibility (χ)	−57.3·10^{−6} cm^{3}/mol
Viscosity	0.6 cP at 20 °C

Structure
Dipole moment	1.6–1.97 D

Hazards
- Occupational safety and health (OHS/OSH)
Main hazards	Flammable
- GHS labelling
Pictograms	(GHS02: Flammable) (GHS07: Exclamation mark)
Signal word	Danger
Hazard statements	H225, H315, H317, H335
Precautionary statements	P210, P233, P240, P241, P242, P243, P261, P264, P271, P272, P280, P302+P352, P303+P361+P353, P304+P340, P312, P321, P332+P313, P333+P313, P362, P363, P370+P378, P403+P233, P403+P235, P405, P501
NFPA 704 (fire diamond)	2 3 2
Flash point	2 °C (36 °F; 275 K)
Autoignition temperature	435 °C (815 °F; 708 K)
Explosive limits	1.7%-8.2%
- Lethal dose or concentration (LD, LC)
LD_{50} (median dose)	8420-10000 mg/kg (rat, oral); 5000-7500 mg/kg (rabbit, dermal)
LC_{50} (median concentration)	18750 ppm (rat, 4 hr); 4447 ppm (mouse, 2 hr); 3750 ppm (rat); 4808 ppm (mammal)
LC_{Lo} (lowest published)	4400 ppm (rat, 8 hr); 4400 ppm (rabbit, 8 hr); 4207 ppm (rabbit, 4.5 hr); 4567 ppm (guinea pig, 5 hr)
- NIOSH (US health exposure limits)
PEL (Permissible)	TWA 100 ppm (410 mg/m^{3})
REL (Recommended)	TWA 100 ppm (410 mg/m^{3})
IDLH (Immediate danger)	1000 ppm

Supplementary data page
- Methyl methacrylate (data page)
- Except where otherwise noted, data are given for materials in their standard state (at 25 °C [77 °F], 100 kPa). verify (what is ?) Infobox references

Methyl methacrylate (MMA) is an organic compound with the formula CH_{2}=C(CH_{3})COOCH_{3}. This colorless liquid, the methyl ester of methacrylic acid (MAA), is a monomer produced on a large scale for the production of poly(methyl methacrylate) (PMMA).

== History ==
MMA was discovered by Bernhard Tollens and his student W. A. Caspary in 1873, who noticed and described its tendency to change into a clear, hard, transparent substance especially in sunlight. Studies on acrylic esters slowly developed until Staudinger's theory of macromolecules and his research into the nature of polyacrylates allowed control over polymerization. The company Rohm and Haas, founded by German chemist Otto Röhm, who investigated the topic for three decades, was finally able to start its industrial production in 1931.

== Production and properties ==
Given the scale of production, many methods have been developed starting from diverse two- to four-carbon precursors. Two principal routes appear to be commonly practiced.

=== Cyanohydrin route ===
The principal route begins with the condensation of acetone and hydrogen cyanide:

(CH_{3})_{2}CO + HCN → (CH_{3})_{2}C(OH)CN

Sulfuric acid then hydrolyzes acetone cyanohydrin (ACH) to a sulfate ester-adduct, which is cracked to the ester:

(CH_{3})_{2}C(OH)CN + 2H_{2}SO_{4} → ((CH_{3})_{2}C(OSO_{3}H)C(O)NH_{2}·H_{2}SO_{4}
→ (CH_{3})_{2}C(OSO_{3}H)C(O)NH_{2} + H_{2}SO_{4}

Methanolysis gives ammonium bisulfate and MMA:

(CH_{3})_{2}C(OSO_{3}H)C(O)NH_{2} + CH_{3}OH → CH_{2}=C(CH_{3})C(O)OCH_{3} + NH_{4}HSO_{4}

Laboratory scale procedures are available for some of these steps.

This technology affords more than 3 billion kilograms per year, and the economics have been optimized. Nevertheless, the ACH route coproduces substantial amounts of ammonium bisulfate: roughly 1.1 kg/(kg MMA). The ammonium bisulfate can be converted to ammonium sulfate, which is a common fruit tree fertilizer.

=== Methyl propionate routes ===
The first stage involves carboalkoxylation of ethylene to produce methyl propionate (MeP):

C_{2}H_{4} + CO + CH_{3}OH → CH_{3}CH_{2}CO_{2}CH_{3}

The MeP synthesis is conducted in a continuous-stirred tank reactor at moderate temperature and pressure using proprietary agitation and gas-liquid mixing arrangement.

In a second set of reactions, MeP is condensed with formaldehyde in a single heterogeneous reaction step to form MMA:

CH_{3}CH_{2}CO_{2}CH_{3} + CH_{2}O → CH_{3}(CH_{2})CCO_{2}CH_{3} + H_{2}O

The reaction of MeP and formaldehyde takes place over a fixed bed of catalyst. This catalyst, caesium oxide on silica, achieves good selectivity to MMA from MeP. The formation of a small amount of heavy, relatively involatile compounds poisons the catalyst. The coke is easily removed and catalyst activity and selectivity restored by controlled, in-situ regeneration. The reactor product stream is separated in a primary distillation so that a crude MMA product stream, free from water, MeP and formaldehyde, is produced. Unreacted MeP and water are recycled via the formaldehyde dehydration process. MMA (>99.9%) is purified by vacuum distillations. The separated streams are returned to the process; there being only a small heavy ester purge stream, which is disposed of in a thermal oxidizer with heat recovered for use in the process.

=== Other routes to MMA ===
==== Via propionaldehyde ====
Ethylene is first hydroformylated to give propanal, which is then condensed with formaldehyde to produce methacrolein. The condensation is catalyzed by a secondary amine. Air oxidation of methacrolein to methacrylic acid completes the synthesis of the acid:

CH_{3}CH_{2}CHO + HCHO → CH_{2}=C(CH_{3})CHO + H_{2}O
CH_{2}=C(CH_{3})CHO + ½ O_{2} → CH_{2}=C(CH_{3})CO_{2}H

==== From isobutyric acid ====
As developed by Atochem and Röhm, isobutyric acid is produced by hydrocarboxylation of propene, using HF as a catalyst:

CH_{2}=CHCH_{3} + CO + H_{2}O → (CH_{3})_{2}CHCO_{2}H

Oxidative dehydrogenation of the isobutyric acid yields methacrylic acid. Metal oxides catalyse this process:

(CH_{3})_{2}CHCO_{2}H + O → CH_{2}=C(CH_{3})CO_{2}H + H_{2}O

==== Methyl acetylene (propyne) process ====
Using Reppe chemistry, methyl acetylene is converted to MMA. As developed by Shell, this process produces MMA in one step reaction with 99% yield with a catalyst system derived from palladium acetate, an organophosphine, and Bronsted acids:

CH≡CCH_{3} + CO + CH_{3}OH → CH_{2}=C(CH_{3})CO_{2}CH_{3}

==== Isobutylene routes ====
The reactions by the direct oxidation method consist of two-step oxidation of isobutylene or TBA with air to produce methacrylic acid and esterification by methanol to produce MMA.

CH_{2}=C(CH_{3})_{2}
or (CH_{3})_{3}C−OH + O_{2} → CH_{2}=C(CH_{3})−CHO + H_{2}O
CH_{2}=C(CH_{3})CHO + ½ O_{2} → CH_{2}=C(CH_{3})CO_{2}H
CH_{2}=C(CH_{3})CO_{2}H + CH_{3}OH → CH_{2}=C(CH_{3})CO_{2}CH_{3} + H_{2}O

A process using isobutylene as a raw material has been commercialized by Escambia Co. Isobutylene is oxidized to provide α-hydroxy isobutyric acid. The conversion uses N_{2}O_{4} and nitric acid at 5–10 °C in the liquid phase. After esterification and dehydration MMA is obtained. Challenges with this route, aside from yield, involve the handling of large amounts of nitric acid and NO_{x}. This method was discontinued in 1965 after an explosion at an operation plant.

==== Methacrylonitrile (MAN) process ====
MAN can be produced by ammoxidation from isobutylene:

(CH_{3})_{2}C=CH_{2} + NH_{3} + ^{3}/_{2} O_{2} → CH_{2}=C(CH_{3})CN + 3 H_{2}O

This step is analogous to the industrial route to acrylonitrile, a related commodity chemical. MAN can be hydrated by sulfuric acid to methacrylamide:

CH_{2}=C(CH_{3})CN + H_{2}SO_{4} + H_{2}O → CH_{2}=C(CH_{3})−CONH_{2}·H_{2}SO_{4}
CH_{2}=C(CH_{3})−CONH_{2}·H_{2}SO_{4} + CH_{3}OH → CH_{2}=C(CH_{3})COOCH_{3} + NH_{4}HSO_{4}

Mitsubishi Gas Chemicals proposed that MAN can be hydrated to methacrylamide without using sulfuric acid and is then esterified to obtain MMA by methylformate.

CH_{2}=C(CH_{3})CN + H_{2}O → CH_{2}=C(CH_{3})−CONH_{2}
CH_{2}=C(CH_{3})−CONH_{2} + HCOOCH_{3} → CH_{2}=C(CH_{3})COOCH_{3} + HCONH_{2}
HCONH_{2} → NH_{3} + CO

==== Esterification of methacrolein ====
Asahi Chemical developed a process based on direct oxidative esterification of methacrolein, which does not produce by-products such as ammonium bisulfate. The raw material is tert-butanol, as in the direct oxidation method. In the first step, methacrolein is produced in the same way as in the direct oxidation process by gas phase catalytic oxidation, is simultaneously oxidized and is esterified in liquid methanol to get MMA directly.

CH_{2}=C(CH_{3})−CHO + CH_{3}OH + ½ O_{2} → CH_{2}=C(CH_{3})−COOCH_{3} + H_{2}O

== Uses ==
The principal application, consuming approximately 75% of the MMA, is the manufacture of polymethyl methacrylate acrylic plastics (PMMA) via an exothermic polymerization reaction. Methyl methacrylate is also used for the production of the co-polymer methyl methacrylate-butadiene-styrene (MBS), used as a modifier for PVC. Another application is as cement used in total hip replacements as well as total knee replacements. Used as the "grout" by orthopedic surgeons to make the bone inserts fix into bone, it greatly reduces post-operative pain from the insertions but has a finite lifespan. Typically, the lifespan of methylmethacrylate as bone cement is 20 years before revision surgery is required. Cemented implants are usually limited to elderly populations that require more immediate short term replacements. In younger populations, cementless implants are used because their lifespan is considerably longer. Methyl methacrylate is also used in fracture repair in small exotic animal species using internal fixation.

MMA is a raw material for the manufacture of other methacrylates. These derivatives include ethyl methacrylate (EMA), butyl methacrylate (BMA) and 2-ethyl hexyl methacrylate (2-EHMA). Methacrylic acid (MAA) is used as a chemical intermediate as well as in the manufacture of coating polymers, construction chemicals and textile applications.

Wood can be impregnated with MMA and polymerized in situ to produce stabilized wood. It is also used for street and highway pavement markings.

MMA is the raw material in many adhesives. They have advantages over other adhesives in that they show a good degree of surface tolerance, rapid drying and flexibility.

== Environmental issues and health hazards ==
Methyl methacrylate (MMA) is a volatile, flammable liquid that can pose health risks through inhalation, skin contact, or eye exposure. Acute exposure may cause irritation of the eyes, skin, and respiratory tract, with symptoms including redness, coughing, headache, dizziness, and nausea at elevated concentrations.

In experimental animals, the oral LD_{50} is approximately 7–10 g/kg (rat), indicating relatively low acute toxicity. Repeated occupational exposure may cause allergic skin sensitization, and methyl methacrylate is recognized as a potent contact allergen, particularly among workers in the dental, orthopedic, and plastics industries.

Current evidence indicates that methyl methacrylate is not classifiable as to its carcinogenicity in humans (Group 3) by the International Agency for Research on Cancer (IARC), and long-term animal studies have not demonstrated carcinogenic effects.

Because of its high volatility and flammability, large releases of methyl methacrylate can present significant industrial hazards. In May 2026, an overheating storage tank containing methyl methacrylate at an aerospace manufacturing facility in Garden Grove, California prompted the evacuation of tens of thousands of residents while emergency crews worked to prevent a possible tank rupture or explosion. The evacuation order was lifted after the tank was stabilized and monitoring indicated no continuing threat to public health.

== See also ==
- Acrylate
- Methacrylates
- PMMA
