= Bisphenol A diglycidyl ether =

- Chemical structure of bisphenol A diglycidyl ether

Names
- Preferred IUPAC name 5,5-Dimethyl-3,7-dioxa-1,9(2)-bis(oxirana)-4,6(2,4)-dibenzenanonaphane
- Other names Diglycidyl ether of bisphenol A; 2,2-Bis(4-glycidyloxyphenyl)propane; Epoxide A

Identifiers
CAS Number	1675-54-3
3D model (JSmol)	Interactive image
Abbreviations	BADGE; DGEBA
ChemSpider	2199
ECHA InfoCard	100.015.294
EC Number	216-823-5
KEGG	C14348
MeSH	C019273
PubChem CID	2286
UNII	F3XRM1NX4H
CompTox Dashboard (EPA)	DTXSID6024624
- InChI: InChI=1S/C21H24O4/c1-21(2,15-3-7-17(8-4-15)22-11-19-13-24-19)16-5-9-18(10-6-16)23-12-20-14-25-20/h3-10,19-20H,11-14H2,1-2H3 Key: LCFVJGUPQDGYKZ-UHFFFAOYSA-N; InChI=1/C21H24O4/c1-21(2,15-3-7-17(8-4-15)22-11-19-13-24-19)16-5-9-18(10-6-16)23-12-20-14-25-20/h3-10,19-20H,11-14H2,1-2H3 Key: LCFVJGUPQDGYKZ-UHFFFAOYAQ
- SMILES: CC(C)(C1=CC=C(C=C1)OCC2CO2)C3=CC=C(C=C3)OCC4CO4

Properties
Chemical formula	C_{21}H_{24}O_{4}
Molar mass	340.419 g·mol^{−1}
- Except where otherwise noted, data are given for materials in their standard state (at 25 °C [77 °F], 100 kPa). verify (what is ?) Infobox references

Bisphenol A diglycidyl ether (commonly abbreviated DGEBA or DGBEA) is an organic compound and is a liquid epoxy resin. The compound is a colorless viscous liquid (commercial samples can appear pale straw-coloured). It is a key component of many epoxy resin formulations. Addition of further bisphenol A and a catalyst and heat can produce bisphenol A glycidyl ether epoxy resins of higher molecular weight that are solid.

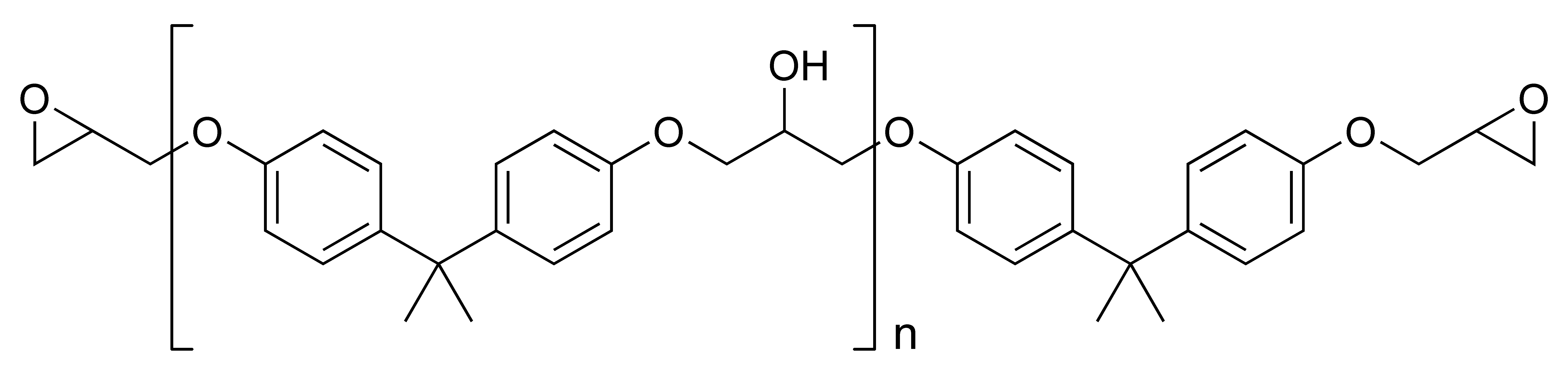
Structure of bisphenol-A diglycidyl ether epoxy resin: n denotes the number of polymerized subunits and is typically in the range from 0 to 25

== Preparation and reactions ==
BADGE is prepared by O-alkylation of bisphenol A with epichlorohydrin. This reaction mainly yield bisphenol A diglycidyl ether as well as some oligomer. The degree of polymerization may be as low as 0.1. The epoxide content of such epoxy resins is commonly expressed as the epoxide number (the number of epoxide equivalents in 1 kg of resin (eq/kg)) or as the equivalent weight (the weight in grams of resin containing 1 mole equivalent of epoxide (g/mol)). Since unsymmetrical epoxides are chiral, the bis epoxide consists of three stereoisomers, although these are not separated.

BADGE reacts with acrylic acid to give vinyl ester resins. The reaction results in opening of the epoxide ring, generating unsaturated esters at each terminus of the molecule. Such materials are often diluted with styrene and converted to resin. Epoxy resins are thermosetting polymers, which are crosslinked using hardeners (curing agents). The most common curing agents for epoxy resins are polyamines, aminoamides, and phenolic compounds.

BADGE slowly hydrolyzes to 2,2-bis[4(2,3-dihydroxypropoxy)phenyl]propane (bis-HPPP).

== Safety ==
BADGE is highly reactive and forms a number of species upon exposure to water or hydrogen chloride, and many of these compounds (including BADGE) are suspected endocrine disruptors. Hydrolysis of the ether bonds liberates bisphenol A, which is also strongly suspected of being an endocrine disruptor.

From the 1990s onward, concern has been raised over the use of BADGE-based epoxy resins in the lining of some cans for foodstuffs, with the chemical being found to leach into foods. BADGE-based epoxy coatings are extensively used for coating the inside of cans which come into contact with food and are thus food contact materials. The materials and analogues and conjugates have been extensively tested for and analytical methods developed.

== See also ==
- Bisphenol AF (BPAF)
- Bisphenol S (BPS)
- EPI-001
