= Methacrylic acid =

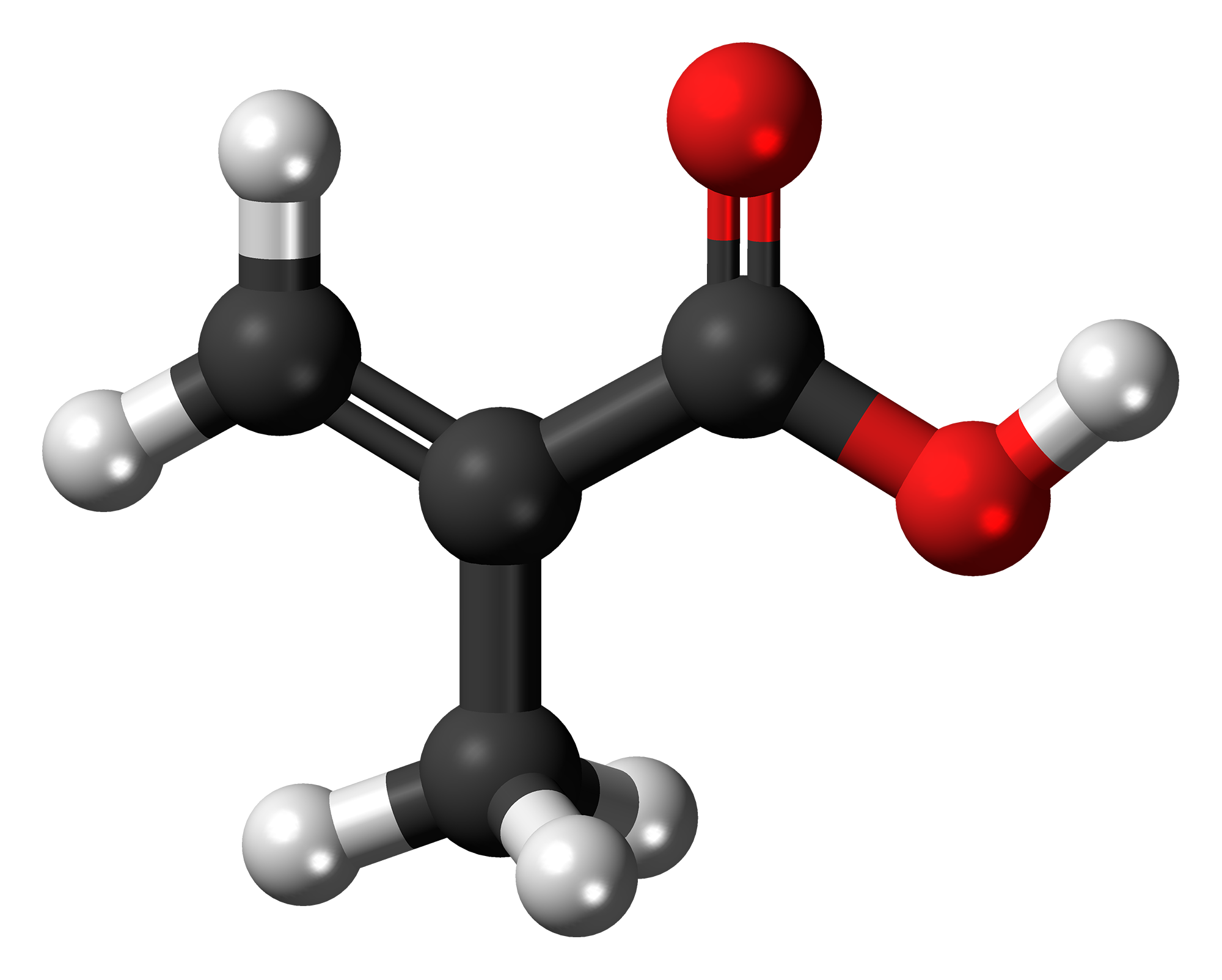

Names
- IUPAC name Methacrylic acid
- Preferred IUPAC name 2-Methylprop-2-enoic acid
- Other names Methacrylic acid 2-Methyl-2-propenoic acid α-Methacrylic acid 2-Methylacrylic acid 2-Methylpropenoic acid

Identifiers
CAS Number	79-41-4
3D model (JSmol)	Interactive image
Abbreviations	MAA
ChEBI	CHEBI:25219
ChemSpider	3951
ECHA InfoCard	100.001.096
EC Number	201-204-4
MeSH	C008384
PubChem CID	4093
UNII	1CS02G8656
CompTox Dashboard (EPA)	DTXSID3025542
- InChI: InChI=1S/C4H6O2/c1-3(2)4(5)6/h1H2,2H3,(H,5,6) Key: CERQOIWHTDAKMF-UHFFFAOYSA-N
- SMILES: CC(C(O)=O)=C

Properties
Chemical formula	C_{4}H_{6}O_{2}
Molar mass	86.09 g/mol
Appearance	Colorless liquid
Odor	Acrid, repulsive
Density	1.015 g/cm^{3}
Melting point	14 to 15 °C (57 to 59 °F; 287 to 288 K)
Boiling point	161 °C (322 °F; 434 K)
Solubility in water	9% (25 °C)
Vapor pressure	0.7 mmHg (20 °C)

Hazards
- GHS labelling
Pictograms	(GHS05: Corrosive) (GHS07: Exclamation mark)
Signal word	Danger
Hazard statements	H302, H312, H314
Precautionary statements	P260, P264, P270, P280, P301+P317, P301+P330+P331, P302+P352, P302+P361+P354, P304+P340, P305+P354+P338, P316, P317, P321, P330, P362+P364, P363, P405, P501
NFPA 704 (fire diamond)	3 2 2
Flash point	77.2 °C (171.0 °F; 350.3 K)
- NIOSH (US health exposure limits)
PEL (Permissible)	none
REL (Recommended)	TWA 20 ppm (70 mg/m^{3}) [skin]
IDLH (Immediate danger)	N.D.
- Except where otherwise noted, data are given for materials in their standard state (at 25 °C [77 °F], 100 kPa). verify (what is ?) Infobox references

Methacrylic acid, abbreviated MAA, is an organic compound with the formula CH_{2}=C(CH_{3})CO_{2}H. This colorless, viscous liquid is a carboxylic acid with an acrid unpleasant odor. It is soluble in warm water and miscible with most organic solvents. Methacrylic acid is produced industrially on a large scale as a precursor to its esters, especially methyl methacrylate (MMA), and to poly(methyl methacrylate) (PMMA).

== Production ==
In the most common route, methacrylic acid is prepared from acetone cyanohydrin, which is converted to methacrylamide sulfate using sulfuric acid. This derivative in turn is hydrolyzed to methacrylic acid, or esterified to methyl methacrylate in one step. Another route to methacrylic acid starts with isobutylene, which obtainable by dehydration of tert-butanol. Isobutylene is oxidized sequentially to methacrolein and then methacrylic acid. Methacrolein for this purpose can also be obtained from formaldehyde and ethylene. Yet a third route involves the dehydrogenation of Isobutyric acid.

Various green routes have been explored but they have not been commercialized. Specifically, the decarboxylation of itaconic acid, citraconic acid, and mesaconic acids affords methacrylic acid. Salts of methacrylic acid have been obtained by boiling citra- or meso-brompyrotartaric acids with alkalis.

Pyrolysis of ethyl methacrylate efficiently gives methacrylic acid.

== Uses and occurrence ==
The main use of methacrylic acid is its polymerization to poly(methyl methacrylate).

It is used in some nail primers to help acrylic nails adhere to the nail plate.

Copolymers consisting partially of methacrylic acid are used in certain types of tablet coatings in order to slow the tablet's dissolution in the digestive tract, and thus extend or delay the release of the active ingredient.

Monocarboxylic unsaturated acids such as methacrylic acid and acrylic acid are used in the production of vinyl ester resins.

MAA esters occur naturally in the oil of Roman chamomile.

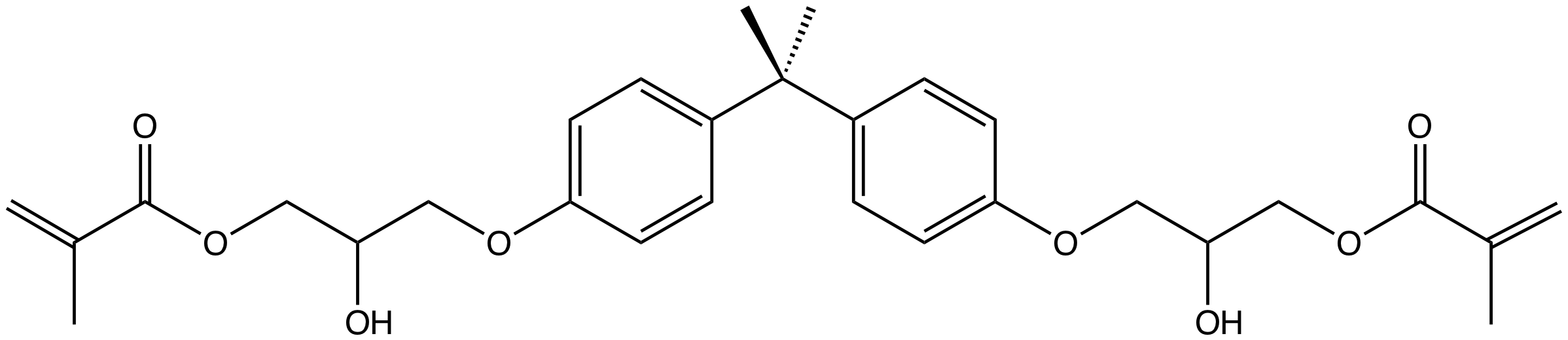
Typical vinyl ester resin derived from bisphenol A diglycidyl ether and methacrylic acid.

== Reactions ==
For commercial applications, MAA is polymerized using azobisisobutyronitrile as a thermally activated free-radical catalyst. Otherwise, MAA is relatively slow to polymerize thermally or photochemically.

Methacrylic acid undergoes several reactions characteristic of α,β-unsaturated acids (see acrylic acid). These reactions include the Diels–Alder reaction and Michael additions. Esterifications are brought about by acid-catalyzed condensations with alcohols, alkylations with certain alkenes, and transesterifications. Epoxide ring-opening gives hydroxyalkyl esters. Sodium amalgam reduces it to isobutyric acid. A polymeric form of methacrylic acid was described in 1880.

== See also ==
- Lactic acid
