= 1-Vinylimidazole =

Names
- Preferred IUPAC name 1-Ethenyl-1H-imidazole
- Other names N-Vinylimidazole

Identifiers
CAS Number	1072-63-5
3D model (JSmol)	Interactive image
ChEBI	CHEBI:44575
ChemSpider	59558
ECHA InfoCard	100.012.739
PubChem CID	66171
UNII	ODY9ION63A
CompTox Dashboard (EPA)	DTXSID0061458
- InChI: InChI=1S/C5H6N2/c1-2-7-4-3-6-5-7/h2-5H,1H2 Key: OSSNTDFYBPYIEC-UHFFFAOYSA-N
- SMILES: C=CN1C=CN=C1

Properties
Chemical formula	C_{5}H_{6}N_{2}
Molar mass	94.117 g·mol^{−1}
Density	1.039 g/mL
Boiling point	192–194 °C (378–381 °F; 465–467 K)
- Except where otherwise noted, data are given for materials in their standard state (at 25 °C [77 °F], 100 kPa). Infobox references

1-Vinylimidazole is a water-soluble basic monomer that forms quaternizable homopolymers by free-radical polymerization with a variety of vinyl and acrylic monomers. The products are functional copolymers, which are used as oil field chemicals and as cosmetic auxiliaries. 1-Vinylimidazole acts as a reactive diluent in UV lacquers, inks, and adhesives.

== Preparation ==
The synthesis and properties of 1-vinylimidazole were described in a comprehensive article by Walter Reppe in 1957. Imidazole is first reacted with potassium hydroxide solution to form potassium imidazolate and the formed water is removed by distillation. Zinc oxide and potassium hydroxide are added to the basic catalyst potassium imidazolate and the free imidazole is ethinylated in 1,4-dioxane at 130 °C with ethine in an autoclave. The yield is 62%.

Synthese von 1-Vinylimidazol nach Reppe

In a laboratory process, imidazole reacts in a two-phase system in the presence of a phase-transfer catalyst with 1,2-dichloroethane to give 1-(2-chloroethyl)imidazole and the latter is converted upon release of hydrogen chloride into 1-vinylimidazole in 92% yield.

Synthese von 1-Vinylimidazol über 1-Chlorethylimidazol

Another lab scale procedure reports the vinylation of imidazole with bromoethene and kieselguhr-supported cesium fluoride in acetonitrile with a yield of 65%.

== Properties ==
1-vinylimidazole is a colorless to brown, light-sensitive, hygroscopic and slightly alkaline reacting liquid with unpleasant, amine-like, fishy smell. The compound is very soluble in water and alcohols. The free-radical polymerization of 1-vinylimidazole proceeds very slowly at pH 9, but at pH 1 it is as fast as that of quaternized 1-vinylimidazole.

Polymerisation von 1-Vinylimidazoliumhydrochlorid

== Applications ==
1-Vinylimidazole is used because of its high reactivity for free-radical (UV) polymerization as reactive diluent in UV lacquers, inks and adhesives for coatings and lacquers. It is also used for the functionalization of polymer surfaces by UV-induced grafting to improve wettability and adhesiveness.

1-Vinylimidazole can be quaternized with n-alkyl iodides to 3-n-alkyl-1-vinylimidazolium iodides or with dimethylsulfate to 3-methyl-1-vinylimidazolium methosulfate. The resulting quaternary ammonium compounds can be free-radically polymerized in aqueous solution with the water-soluble azo initiator 4,4'-azobisvaleric acid.

Polymerisation von quartären 1-Vinylimidazoliumverbindungen

Copolymers of quaternary N-vinylimidazolium salts and polar monomers (in particular N-vinylpyrrolidone) are cationic polyelectrolytes and are suitable, inter alia, as flocculants for water treatment, as flotation auxiliaries for coal and ore processing, as additives for drilling fluids and cementations in the extraction of oil, as emulsion cleavers for the dewatering of crude oil emulsions in refineries, and as corrosion inhibitors for iron alloys.

Copolymers of quaternary N-vinylimidazolium salts and polymerizable unsaturated carboxylic acids (such as methacrylic acid or sulfonic acids, such as 2-acrylamido-2-methylpropanesulfonic acid) reduce the electrostatic charge, for example of hair, and are therefore used in shampoos for improving wet combability.

1-Vinylimidazole polymerizes radically in an aqueous or alcoholic solution to form homopolymers with average molar masses of from 2,000 to 50,000, which, however, often still contain relatively high residual monomer contents (> 600 ppm). By adding sulfur-containing chain regulators, such as mercaptoethanol, the undesired residual content of the N-vinylimidazole can be reduced to less than 50 ppm, although the molar mass of the polymer obtained also decreases.

Hydrogels from poly-1-vinylimidazole very efficiently bind a large number of heavy metal ions (except Pb^{2+}), which can be selectively and quantitatively eluted from the hydrogel.

1-Vinylimidazole can be copolymerized free-radically with a variety of vinyl and acrylic monomers. Water-soluble copolymers with vinylpyrrolidone are used as color transfer inhibitors in detergent preparations,

Copolymerisation von NVI und NVP zu Poly(NVI-co-NVP)

with vinyl acetate as a coating of lithographic printing plates, with acrylic acid esters or methacrylic acid esters or 2-hydroxyethyl methacrylate as adhesion promoters in paints or with acrylonitrile as precursors for carbon fibers.
