= Topical drug delivery =

Route of drug administration

Topical drug delivery (TDD) is a route of drug administration that allows the topical formulation to be delivered across the skin upon application, hence producing a localized effect to treat skin disorders like eczema. The formulation of topical drugs can be classified into corticosteroids, antibiotics, antiseptics, and anti-fungal. The mechanism of topical delivery includes the diffusion and metabolism of drugs in the skin. Historically, topical route was the first route of medication used to deliver drugs in humans in ancient Egyptian and Babylonian in 3000 BCE. In these ancient cities, topical medications like ointments and potions were used on the skin. The delivery of topical drugs needs to pass through multiple skin layers and undergo pharmacokinetics, hence factor like dermal diseases minimize the bioavailability of the topical drugs. The wide use of topical drugs leads to the advancement in topical drug delivery. These advancements are used to enhance the delivery of topical medications to the skin by using chemical and physical agents. For chemical agents, carriers like liposomes and nanotechnologies are used to enhance the absorption of topical drugs. On the other hand, physical agents, like micro-needles is other approach for enhancement ofabsorption. Besides using carriers, other factors such as pH, lipophilicity, and drug molecule size govern the effectiveness of topical formulation.

== History ==
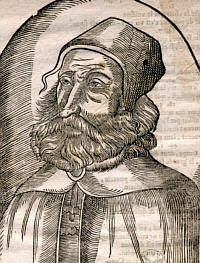
Claudius Galenus

In ancient times, human skin was used as a layer for self-expression by painting cosmetic products on it. They used those products as a protection for their skin from the sun and dry environment. Later on in 2000 BCE, the Chinese used topical remedies that wrap in bandages to treat skin diseases. The contact between these topical remedies and skin deliver its therapeutic effect on the skin. The newer development of topical drugs occurred between 130 and 200 AD. This development was made by Claudius Galenus, a Greek physician. He first loaded the herb medication to Western medicine and formulated it as cream. More recently in the 1920s, some observations were made when applying topical skin, such as to determine its systemic effects. In 1938, Zondek successfully managed urogenital infections after applying chloroxylenol on the skin by the use of disinfectant in ointment form. After some years, observations were made from various experiments. These experiments led to the development of skin toxicology in the mid-1970s, including symptoms like irritation, skin inflammation, and skin photo-toxicity upon application of topical drugs. After the development of toxicology, a mathematical model was also created for skin diffusion coefficient formulated by Michaels. This formulation suggests how they related to the aqueous solubility and partition coefficient in skin.

== Skin absorption ==
=== Skin layers ===
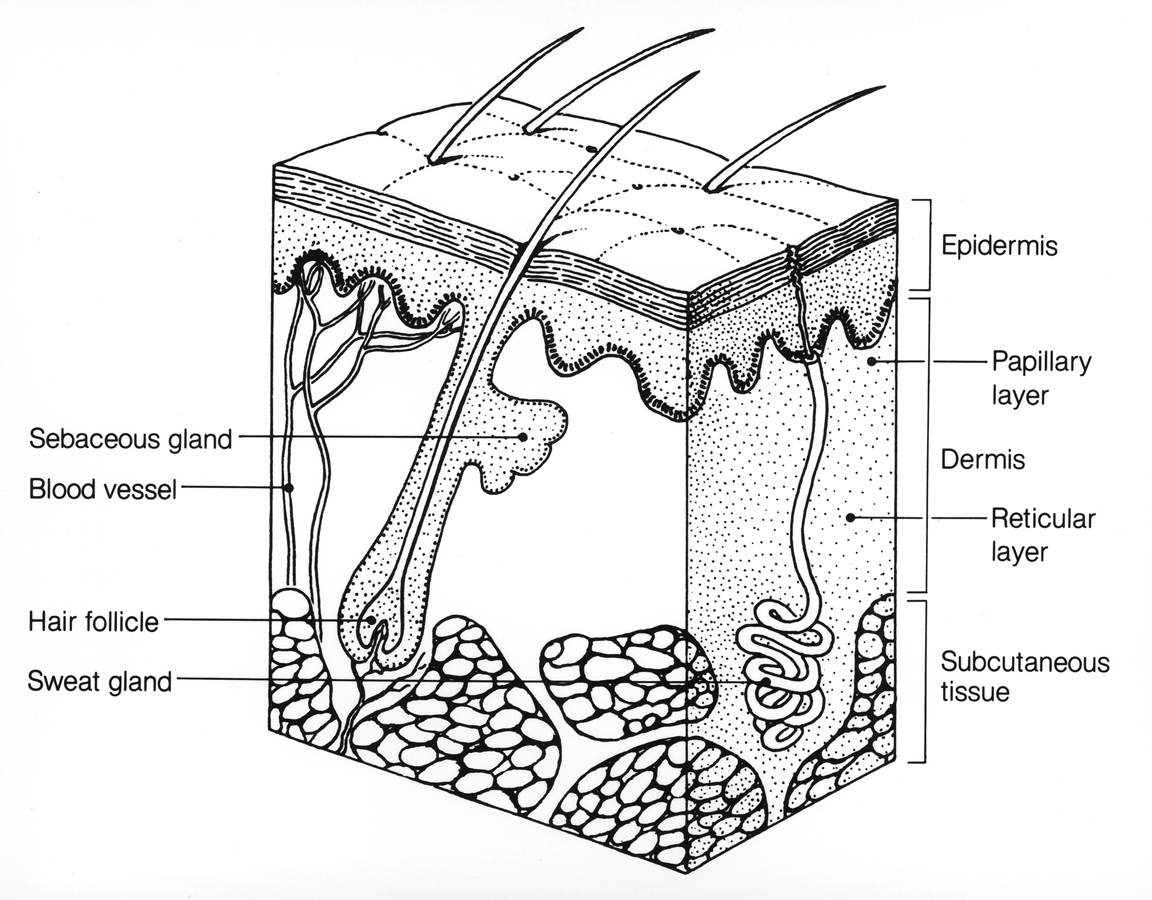
Skin layers

The human body's largest organ is the skin layers, which protects against foreign particles. Human skin contains several layers, including the subcutaneous layer, the dermis, the epidermis, the stratum corneum, and the appendages. Each of these layers have an effect on the absorption of topical drug. When the topical drug is applied to the skin, it must pass via the stratum corneum, which is the outermost skin layer. Stratum corneum's function includes prevention of water loss in skin and inhibit the penetration of foreign molecules into the dermal layers. Hence, it also prevents the hydrophilic molecules to get absorbed into the skin since it is made out of bilayered lipids. With this barrier, stratum corneum affects the permeability of topical drugs. Another part of the skin is called the appendages, and it is known as the "shortcut" for topical drug delivery. The shortcut pathway allows the drug molecules to first pass the stratum corneum barrier via hair follicles.

=== Diffusion ===
When drugs are applied to skin topically, the drug molecules will undergo passive diffusion. This process occurs down the concentration gradient when drug molecules move to one area to another region. Diffusion is described by a mathematical equation. The drug molecule (J), known as flux and it represents the entry of topical drug molecules across the skin membrane. The skin membrane is the area (A) for the topical drug molecules to travel across. The skin membrane thickness is known as (h) in the expression, and it determines the diffusion path length. The (C) is the concentration of the diffusing substance across the skin layers and the (D) is the diffusion coefficient. The expression illustrates the transportation of topical drug molecules across the stratum corneum membrane through diffusion.

Diffusion expression:

$J= ADC/h$

=== Mechanism ===
Upon application of the topical drug on the skin, it will diffuse to the outer layer of the skin, known as stratum corneum. There are three routes possible for the drugs to cross the skin. The first route is through the appendages. It is known as the "first cut" where the drug molecules will be partitioned into the sweat gland to bypass the stratum corneum barrier. If the drug molecules are not transported via the "first cut", they usually remain in the stratum corneum's bilayered lipids, where the drug molecules transport through either the transcellular route or paracellular route into the deeper area of the skin like subcutaneous layer. For the paracellular route, it means that the solutes transport via the junction between the cell. When the topical drug molecules transport via the paracellular route, it needs to travel across the stratum corneum, which is a highly fat region, but between the cells. On the other hand, the topical drug molecules may travel through the transcellular route. This route allows molecules to be transported via the cell. Transcellular route transports the drug molecule into the bilayered lipid cells found in stratum corneum. Inside of the bilayered lipids in the stratum corneum is a water-soluble environment, and the drug molecules will diffuse through these bilayered lipids into deeper area of the skin. During the transportation of the topical drug molecules, it can bind to the keratin that exists as one of the skin components in the stratum corneum.

=== Skin metabolism ===
The activities of skin metabolism are commonly occurring on the skin surface, appendages, the stratum corneum, and the viable epidermis. This process comprises phase one hydrolysis, reduction, and oxidation, also known as functionalization phase. If phase one is insufficient to metabolize the drugs, phase two conjugation reaction occurs. This phase includes glucuronidation, sulfation, and acetylation. It is found that phase two activities are lower than phase two in the skin. One common example is thearylamine-type hair dye, after it is applied topically, it will undergo metabolism in the skin through enzyme N-acetyltransferase, thus resulting in a N-acetylated metabolite. These metabolic enzymes cause the loss of topical drug activities, thus reducing its bioavailability. They may eventually form atoxic compound that reaches to the systemic circulation and causes damage to the skin layers. The longer the topical drug remains in the skin, the greater amount of it will be metabolized by the underlying enzymes. To reduce such an effect, the topical drug needs to remain on the skin for a shorter period of time. Also, certain amount of topical molecules needs to be applied to the skin and cause metabolic enzymes saturation.

=== Factors affect topical absorption ===
The amount of topical drug molecules being delivered to the skin is affected solely by the physicochemical properties of the topical drug. The first factor is the weight of the drug molecule. The smaller of the drug molecular weight or particle size, the higher rate of its diffusion and absorption into the skin. The second factor is the lipophilicity of the drug molecules, since the three pathways for absorption are quite lipophilic. The higher lipophilicity of it, the easier of the drug molecules to be absorbed when compared to the hydrophilic drug molecules. The third parameter is the pH level of the skin. The pH of the skin layers are basic, hence basic topical drugs will be absorbed better than acidic topical drugs. These factors are vital to determine the permeability of topical drug delivery.

== Skin permeability enhancers ==
=== Colloidal System ===
Colloidal system is one of the techniques used for topical drug delivery into the skin and functions as skin permeability enhancers. They are known as carriers and can be classified into nanoparticles, liposomes, and nanoemugel.

==== Liposome ====
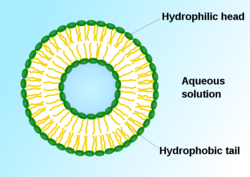
Liposome

Liposomes contain a bilayer of phospholipids in a sphere shape that may exist as one or more than one bilayer of phospholipids. With this structure, its function is to trap hydrophilic or lipophilic drug molecules within the spherical bilayers. The hydrophilic drug molecule sticks to the hydrophilic head since it is polar and favours water. On the other hand, the lipophilic drug molecules will be entrapped in the phospholipid tails of the bilayer due to its lipophilic nature. With these mechanisms, liposomes will behave like carriers and carry the lipophilic or hydrophilic drug molecules into the stratum corneum and release them into deeper layers of the skin by interacting with the bilayers lipids found in stratum corneum. The Use of liposome as carrier enhances the overall permeability of topical drug into the skin to reach the target site. For example, a drug like amphotericin B, is used to treat fungal infections. The drug is loaded into liposome and this carrier enhances the penetration of amphotericin B into the skin, regardless of its molecular weight.

==== Nanoemulgel ====
Nanoemulgel is another type of enhancer for delivery of topical drugs into the skin. The formulation process for nanoemulgel is produced by incorporating the nanoemulsion into a gel matrix. The gels are made out of aqueous bases and it allows for a more rapid release of drugs through dissolution. The use of nanoemulgel enhances patient compliance because the use of gel is less greasy than traditional cream or ointment, hence there is less incident in skin irritation. Nanoemulgel increases the topical drug bioavailability by inserting the lipophilic drug molecules into the oil droplet of the nanoemulgel and it will travel through the skin layers. With its high dissolution rate, the nanoemulgel produces a high concentration gradient toward the skin, thus allowing for a rapid uptake of oil droplet into the stratum corneum. Also, the surfactant being incorporated into the nanoemulgel has the ability to penetrate through the bilayer lipid by interrupting the hydrogen bond between the lipid in the skin to further enhance its permeability. In terms of treatment, the use of nanoemulgel is against cancer cells and useful in skin cancer. Also, the formulation of nanoemulgel with methoxsalen is used to treat psoriasis. The carrier enhances both the penetration and accumulation of methoxsalen in the skin layers.

=== Physical Agents ===
==== Micro-needles ====
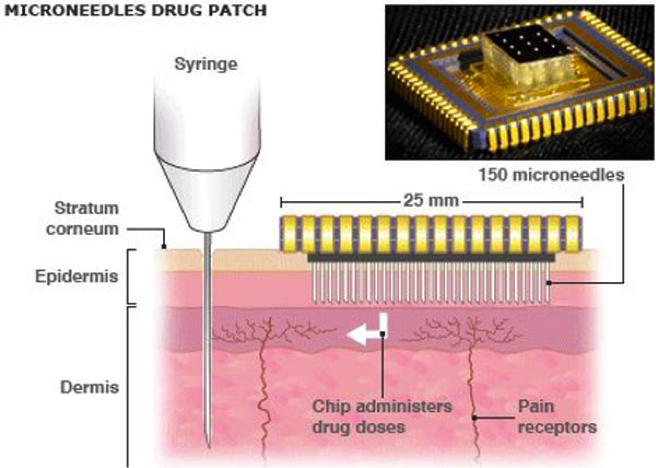
Micro-needles

Micro-needle belongs to the physical enhancer to improve absorption of topical drug molecules into the skin. It is known as 'poke and patch' because it uses tiny needles and stick into the skin across the stratum corneum. These tiny needles ensure that they will not contact the nerve endings or cutaneous blood vessels under the skin, hence they can be removed easily from the skin. There are several types of micro-needle, the first one is solid micro-needles. The solid micro-needles are used to project into the skin. Once the needles are removed after insertion, the topical drugs are applied to skin. This enhances the ability of drugs to diffuse across the viable epidermis. The second type is the dissolvable micro-needle. These types of needles are composed of materials that allow them to dissolve after poking into the skin, hence no need to remove the needles after injection. The third type of micro-needle is the swell-able micro-needles, which consist of hydrogel. After poking its needle into the skin, it allows the skin interstitial fluid diffuse into the micro-needles, thus it will swell to diffuse the drug molecules across the skin. It is found that micro-needles are safe and effective in enhancing skin permeability.
