= Acetylene =

Hydrocarbon compound (HC≡CH)

- Acetylene

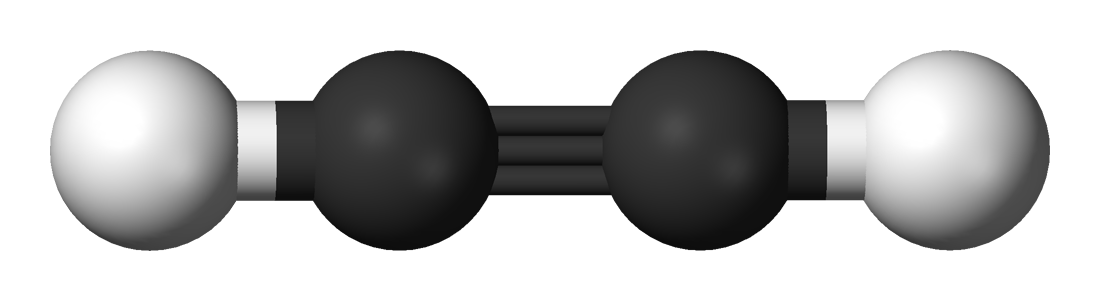
- Acetylene

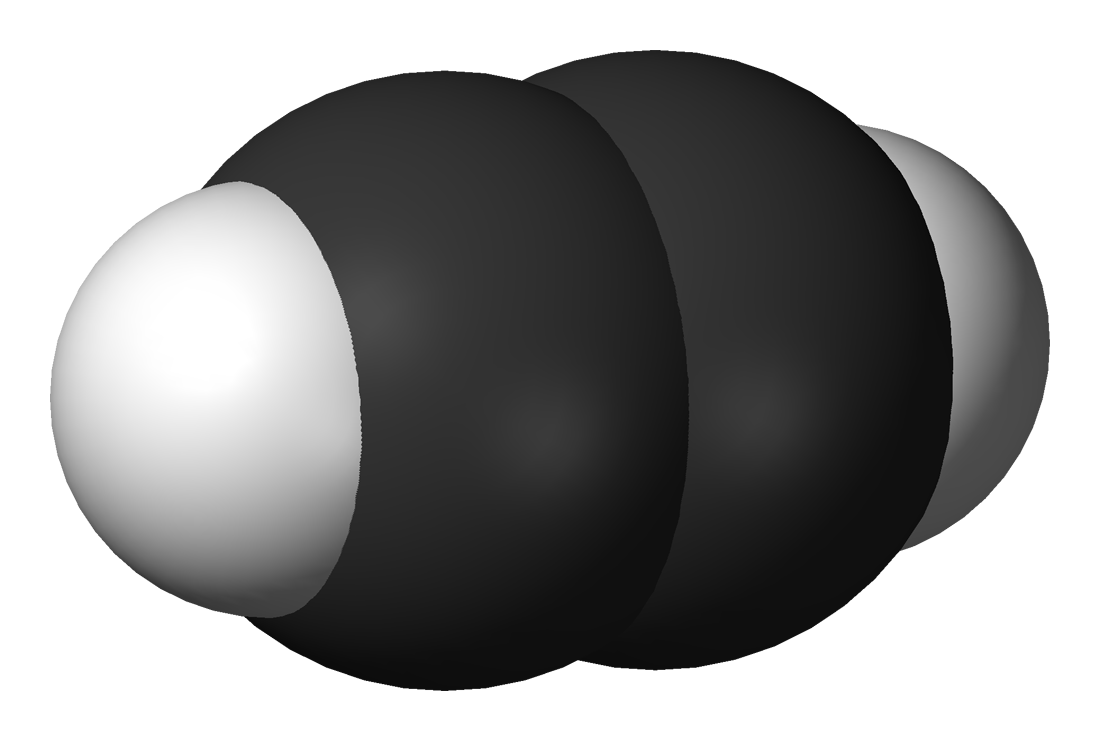

Names
- Preferred IUPAC name Acetylene
- Systematic IUPAC name Ethyne

Identifiers
CAS Number	74-86-2
3D model (JSmol)	Interactive image
Beilstein Reference	906677
ChEBI	CHEBI:27518
ChEMBL	ChEMBL116336
ChemSpider	6086
ECHA InfoCard	100.000.743
EC Number	200-816-9
Gmelin Reference	210
KEGG	C01548
PubChem CID	6326
RTECS number	AO9600000
UNII	OC7TV75O83
UN number	1001 (dissolved); 3138 (in mixture with ethylene and propylene)
CompTox Dashboard (EPA)	DTXSID6026379
- InChI: InChI=1S/C2H2/c1-2/h1-2H Key: HSFWRNGVRCDJHI-UHFFFAOYSA-N; InChI=1/C2H2/c1-2/h1-2H Key: HSFWRNGVRCDJHI-UHFFFAOYAY
- SMILES: C#C

Properties
Chemical formula	C_{2}H_{2}
Molar mass	26.038 g·mol^{−1}
Appearance	Colorless gas
Odor	Odorless
Density	1.1772 g/L = 1.1772 kg/m^{3} (0 °C, 101.3 kPa)
Melting point	−80.8 °C (−113.4 °F; 192.3 K) Triple point at 1.27 atm
Sublimation conditions	−84 °C; −119 °F; 189 K (1 atm)
Solubility in water	slightly soluble
Solubility	slightly soluble in alcohol soluble in acetone, benzene
Vapor pressure	44.2 atm (20 °C)
Acidity (pK_{a})	25
Conjugate acid	Ethynium
Conjugate base	Acetylide
Magnetic susceptibility (χ)	−20.8×10^{−6} cm^{3}/mol
Thermal conductivity	21.4 mW·m^{−1}·K^{−1} (300 K)

Structure
Molecular shape	Linear

Thermochemistry
Heat capacity (C)	44.036 J·mol^{−1}·K^{−1}
Std molar entropy (S^{⦵}_{298})	200.927 J·mol^{−1}·K^{−1}
Std enthalpy of formation (Δ_{f}H^{⦵}_{298})	227.400 kJ·mol^{−1}
Gibbs free energy (Δ_{f}G^{⦵})	209.879 kJ·mol^{−1}
Std enthalpy of combustion (Δ_{c}H^{⦵}_{298})	1300 kJ·mol^{−1}

Hazards
- GHS labelling
Pictograms	(GHS02: Flammable) (GHS04: Compressed Gas) (GHS07: Exclamation mark)
Signal word	Danger
Hazard statements	H220, H230, H336
Precautionary statements	P202, P210, P233, P261, P271, P304, P312, P340, P377, P381, P403, P405, P501
NFPA 704 (fire diamond)	1 4 3
Autoignition temperature	300 °C (572 °F; 573 K)
Explosive limits	2.5–100%
- NIOSH (US health exposure limits)
PEL (Permissible)	none
REL (Recommended)	C 2500 ppm (2662 mg/m^{3})
IDLH (Immediate danger)	N.D.
- Except where otherwise noted, data are given for materials in their standard state (at 25 °C [77 °F], 100 kPa). verify (what is ?) Infobox references

Acetylene (systematic name: ethyne) is a chemical compound with the formula C_{2}H_{2} and structure HC≡CH. It is a hydrocarbon and the simplest alkyne. This colorless gas is widely used as a fuel and a chemical building block. It is unstable in its pure form and thus is usually handled as a solution. Pure acetylene is odorless, but commercial grades usually have a marked odor due to impurities such as divinyl sulfide and phosphine.

As an alkyne, acetylene is unsaturated because its two carbon atoms are bonded together in a triple bond. The carbon–carbon triple bond places all four atoms in the same straight line, with CCH bond angles of 180°. Although indefinitely persistent (i.e., kinetically "stable") at 1 atm at room temperature, acetylene is nevertheless a highly endothermic (i.e., thermodynamically unstable) molecule, with a standard enthalpy of formation of +54.2 kcal/mol. This is a result of the high energy content of the triple bond. The energy stored therein is released when acetylene is burned (or otherwise undergoes a chemical reaction).

== Discovery ==
Acetylene was discovered in 1836 by Edmund Davy, who identified it as a "new carburet of hydrogen". It was an accidental discovery while attempting to isolate potassium metal. By heating potassium carbonate with carbon at very high temperatures, he produced a residue of what is now known as potassium carbide, (K_{2}C_{2}), which reacted with water to release the new gas. It was rediscovered in 1860 by French chemist Marcellin Berthelot, who coined the name acétylène. Berthelot's empirical formula for acetylene (C_{4}H_{2}), as well as the alternative name "quadricarbure d'hydrogène" (hydrogen quadricarbide), were incorrect because many chemists at that time used the wrong atomic mass for carbon (6 instead of 12). Berthelot was able to prepare this gas by passing vapours of organic compounds (methanol, ethanol, etc.) through a red hot tube and collecting the effluent. He also found that acetylene was formed by sparking electricity through mixed cyanogen and hydrogen gases. Berthelot later obtained acetylene directly by passing hydrogen between the poles of a carbon arc.

== Preparation ==
=== Partial combustion of hydrocarbons ===
Since the 1950s, acetylene has mainly been manufactured by the partial combustion of methane in the US, much of the EU, and many other countries:

3 CH_{4} + 3 O_{2} → C_{2}H_{2} + CO + 5 H_{2}O

It is a recovered side product in production of ethylene by cracking of hydrocarbons. Approximately 400,000 tonnes were produced by this method in 1983. Its presence in ethylene is usually undesirable because of its explosive character and its ability to poison Ziegler–Natta catalysts. It is selectively hydrogenated into ethylene, usually using Pd–Ag catalysts.

=== Dehydrogenation of alkanes ===
The heaviest alkanes in petroleum and natural gas are cracked into lighter molecules which are dehydrogenated at high temperature:

C_{2}H_{6} → C_{2}H_{2} + 2 H_{2}
2 CH_{4} → C_{2}H_{2} + 3 H_{2}

This last reaction is implemented in the process of anaerobic decomposition of methane by microwave plasma.

=== Carbochemical method ===
The first sample of acetylene produced was by Edmund Davy in 1836, via hydrolysis (decomposition using water) of potassium carbide. Subsequently, the first industrial method for synthesis was by hydrolysis of calcium carbide:

CaC_{2} + 2 H_{2}O → Ca(OH)_{2} + C_{2}H_{2}

This reaction was discovered by Friedrich Wöhler in 1862, but a suitable commercial scale production method which allowed acetylene to be put into wider scale use was not found until 1892 by the Canadian inventor Thomas Willson while searching for a viable commercial production method for aluminum.

As late as the early 21st century, China, Japan, and Eastern Europe produced acetylene primarily by this method.

The use of this technology has since declined worldwide with the notable exception of China, with its emphasis on coal-based chemical industry, as of 2013. Otherwise oil has increasingly supplanted coal as the chief source of reduced carbon.

Calcium carbide production requires high temperatures, ~2000 °C, necessitating the use of an electric arc furnace. In the US, this process was an important part of the late-19th century revolution in chemistry enabled by the massive hydroelectric power project at Niagara Falls.

== Bonding ==
Bond lengths and angles in acetylene

In terms of valence bond theory, in each carbon atom the 2s orbital hybridizes with one 2p orbital thus forming an sp hybrid. The other two 2p orbitals remain unhybridized. The two ends of the two sp hybrid orbital overlap to form a strong σ valence bond between the carbons, while on each of the other two ends hydrogen atoms attach also by σ bonds. The two unchanged 2p orbitals form a pair of weaker π bonds.

Since acetylene is a linear symmetrical molecule, it possesses the D_{∞h} point group.

== Physical properties ==
=== Changes of state ===
At atmospheric pressure, acetylene cannot exist as a liquid and does not have a melting point. The triple point on the phase diagram corresponds to the melting point (−80.8 °C) at the minimal pressure at which liquid acetylene can exist (1.27 atm). At temperatures below the triple point, solid acetylene can change directly to the vapour (gas) by sublimation. The sublimation point at atmospheric pressure is −84.0 °C.

=== Other ===
At room temperature and atmospheric pressure, the solubility of acetylene in acetone is 27.9 g per kg. For the same amount of dimethylformamide (DMF), the solubility is 51 g. At 20.26 bar, the solubility increases to 689.0 and 628.0 g for acetone and DMF, respectively. These solvents are used in pressurized gas cylinders.

== Applications ==
=== Welding ===
Approximately 20% of acetylene is supplied by the industrial gases industry for oxyacetylene gas welding and cutting due to the high temperature of the flame. Combustion of acetylene with oxygen produces a flame of over 3,600 K (3,330 °C; 6,020 °F), releasing 11.8 kJ/g. Oxygen with acetylene is the hottest burning common gas mixture. Acetylene is the third-hottest natural chemical flame after dicyanoacetylene's 5,260 K (4,990 °C; 9,010 °F) and cyanogen at 4,798 K (4,525 °C; 8,177 °F). Oxy-acetylene welding was a popular welding process in previous decades. The development and advantages of arc-based welding processes have made oxy-fuel welding nearly extinct for many applications. Acetylene usage for welding has dropped significantly. On the other hand, oxy-acetylene welding equipment is quite versatile – not only because the torch is preferred for some sorts of iron or steel welding (as in certain artistic applications), but also because it lends itself easily to brazing, braze-welding, metal heating (for annealing or tempering, bending or forming), the loosening of corroded nuts and bolts, and other applications. Bell Canada cable-repair technicians still use portable acetylene-fuelled torch kits as a soldering tool for sealing lead sleeve splices in manholes and in some aerial locations. Oxyacetylene welding may also be used in areas where electricity is not readily accessible. Oxyacetylene cutting is used in many metal fabrication shops. For use in welding and cutting, the working pressures must be controlled by a regulator, since above 15 psi (100 kPa), if subjected to a shockwave (caused, for example, by a flashback), acetylene decomposes explosively into hydrogen and carbon.

=== Chemicals ===
Acetylene is useful for many processes, but few are conducted on a commercial scale.

One of the major chemical applications is ethynylation of formaldehyde. Acetylene adds to aldehydes and ketones to form α-ethynyl alcohols:

The reaction gives butynediol, with propargyl alcohol as the by-product. Copper acetylide is used as the catalyst.

In addition to ethynylation, acetylene reacts with carbon monoxide to give acrylic acid, or acrylic esters. Metal catalysts are required. These derivatives form products such as acrylic fibers, glasses, paints, resins, and polymers. Except in China, use of acetylene as a chemical feedstock has declined by 70% from 1965 to 2007 owing to cost and environmental considerations. In China, acetylene is a major precursor to vinyl chloride.

=== Historical uses ===
Prior to the widespread use of petrochemicals, coal-derived acetylene was a building block for several industrial chemicals. Thus acetylene can be hydrated to give acetaldehyde, which in turn can be oxidized to acetic acid. Processes leading to acrylates were also commercialized. Almost all of these processes became obsolete with the availability of petroleum-derived ethylene and propylene.

=== Niche applications ===
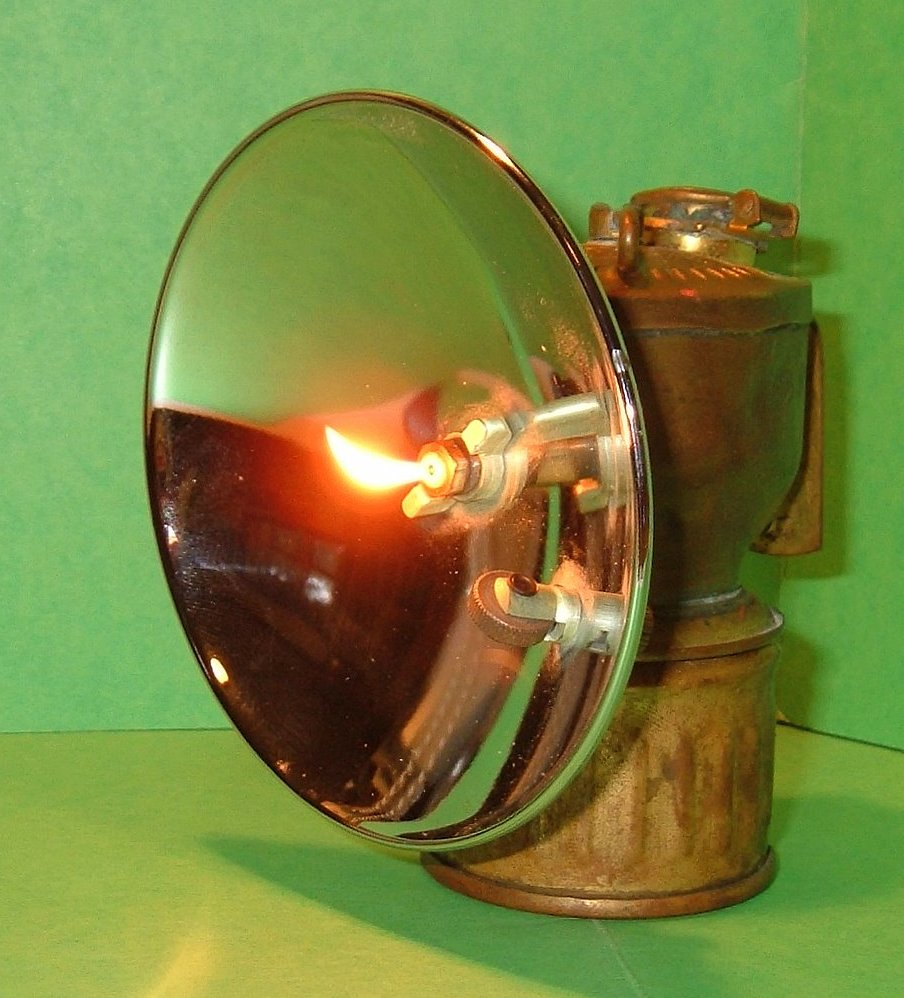
A "carbide lamp", which burns acetylene produced by hydrolysis of calcium carbide.

In 1881, the Russian chemist Mikhail Kucherov described the hydration of acetylene to acetaldehyde using catalysts such as mercury(II) bromide. Before the advent of the Wacker process, this reaction was conducted on an industrial scale.

The polymerization of acetylene with Ziegler–Natta catalysts produces polyacetylene films. Polyacetylene, a chain of CH centres with alternating single and double bonds, was one of the first discovered organic semiconductors. Its reaction with iodine produces a highly electrically conducting material. Although such materials are not useful, these discoveries led to the developments of organic semiconductors, as recognized by the Nobel Prize in Chemistry in 2000 to Alan J. Heeger, Alan G MacDiarmid, and Hideki Shirakawa.

In the 1920s, pure acetylene was experimentally used as an inhalation anesthetic.

Acetylene is sometimes used for carburization (that is, hardening) of steel when the object is too large to fit into a furnace.

Acetylene is used to volatilize carbon in radiocarbon dating. The carbonaceous material in an archeological sample is treated with lithium metal in a small specialized research furnace to form lithium carbide (also known as lithium acetylide). The carbide can then be reacted with water, as usual, to form acetylene gas to feed into a mass spectrometer to measure the isotopic ratio of carbon-14 to carbon-12.

Acetylene combustion produces a strong, bright light and the ubiquity of carbide lamps drove much acetylene commercialization in the early 20th century. Common applications included coastal lighthouses, street lights, and automobile and mining headlamps. In most of these applications, direct combustion is a fire hazard, and so acetylene has been replaced, first by incandescent lighting and many years later by low-power/high-lumen LEDs. Nevertheless, acetylene lamps remain in limited use in remote or otherwise inaccessible areas and in countries with a weak or unreliable central electric grid.

== Natural occurrence ==
The energy richness of the C≡C triple bond and the rather high solubility of acetylene in water make it a suitable substrate for bacteria, provided an adequate source is available. A number of bacteria living on acetylene have been identified. The enzyme acetylene hydratase catalyzes the hydration of acetylene to give acetaldehyde:

C_{2}H_{2} + H_{2}O → CH_{3}CHO

Acetylene is a moderately common chemical in the universe, often associated with the atmospheres of gas giants. One curious discovery of acetylene is on Enceladus, a moon of Saturn. Natural acetylene is believed to form from catalytic decomposition of long-chain hydrocarbons at temperatures of 1,700 K (1,430 °C; 2,600 °F) and above. Since such temperatures are highly unlikely on such a small distant body, this discovery is potentially suggestive of catalytic reactions within that moon, making it a promising site to search for prebiotic chemistry.

== Reactions ==
=== Vinylation reactions ===
In vinylation reactions, H−X compounds add across the triple bond. Alcohols and phenols add to acetylene to give vinyl ethers. Thiols give vinyl thioethers. Similarly, vinylpyrrolidone and vinylcarbazole are produced industrially by vinylation of 2-pyrrolidone and carbazole.

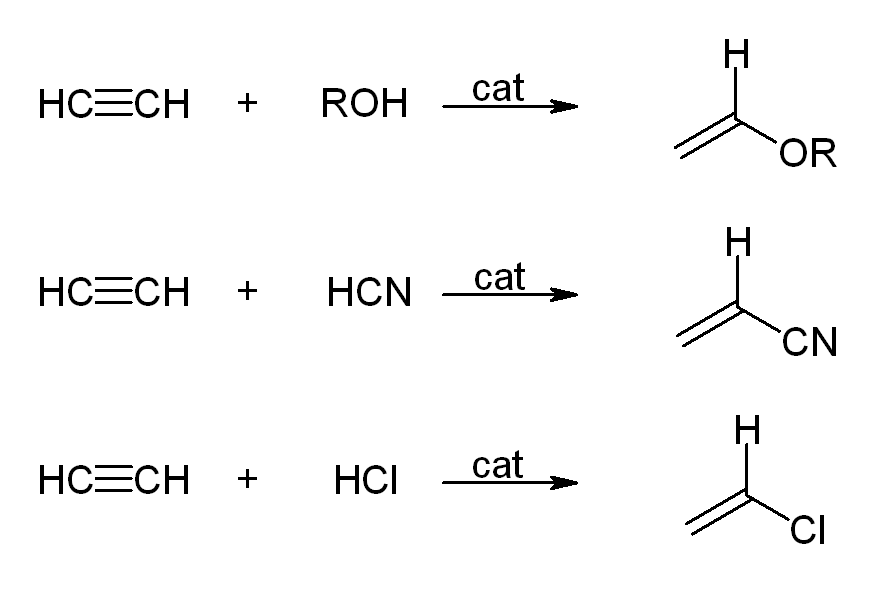

The hydration of acetylene is a vinylation reaction, but the resulting vinyl alcohol isomerizes to acetaldehyde. The reaction is catalyzed by mercury salts. This reaction once was the dominant technology for acetaldehyde production, but it has been displaced by the Wacker process, which affords acetaldehyde by oxidation of ethylene, a cheaper feedstock. A similar situation applies to the conversion of acetylene to the valuable vinyl chloride by hydrochlorination versus the oxychlorination of ethylene.

Vinyl acetate is used instead of acetylene for some vinylations, which are more accurately described as transvinylations. Higher esters of vinyl acetate have been used in the synthesis of vinyl formate.

=== Organometallic chemistry ===
Acetylene and its derivatives (2-butyne, diphenylacetylene, etc.) form complexes with transition metals. Its bonding to the metal is somewhat similar to that of ethylene complexes. These complexes are intermediates in many catalytic reactions such as alkyne trimerisation to benzene, tetramerization to cyclooctatetraene, and carbonylation to hydroquinone:

Fe(CO)_{5} + 4 C_{2}H_{2} + 2 H_{2}O → 2 C_{6}H_{4}(OH)_{2} + FeCO_{3} at basic conditions (50–80 °C, 20–25 atm).

Metal acetylides, species of the formula L_{n}M−C_{2}R, are also common. Copper(I) acetylide and silver acetylide can be formed in aqueous solutions with ease due to a favorable solubility equilibrium.

=== Acid–base reactions ===
Acetylene has a pK_{a} of 25. Acetylene can be deprotonated by a superbase to form an acetylide:

HC≡CH + RM → RH + HC≡CM

Various organometallic and inorganic reagents are effective.

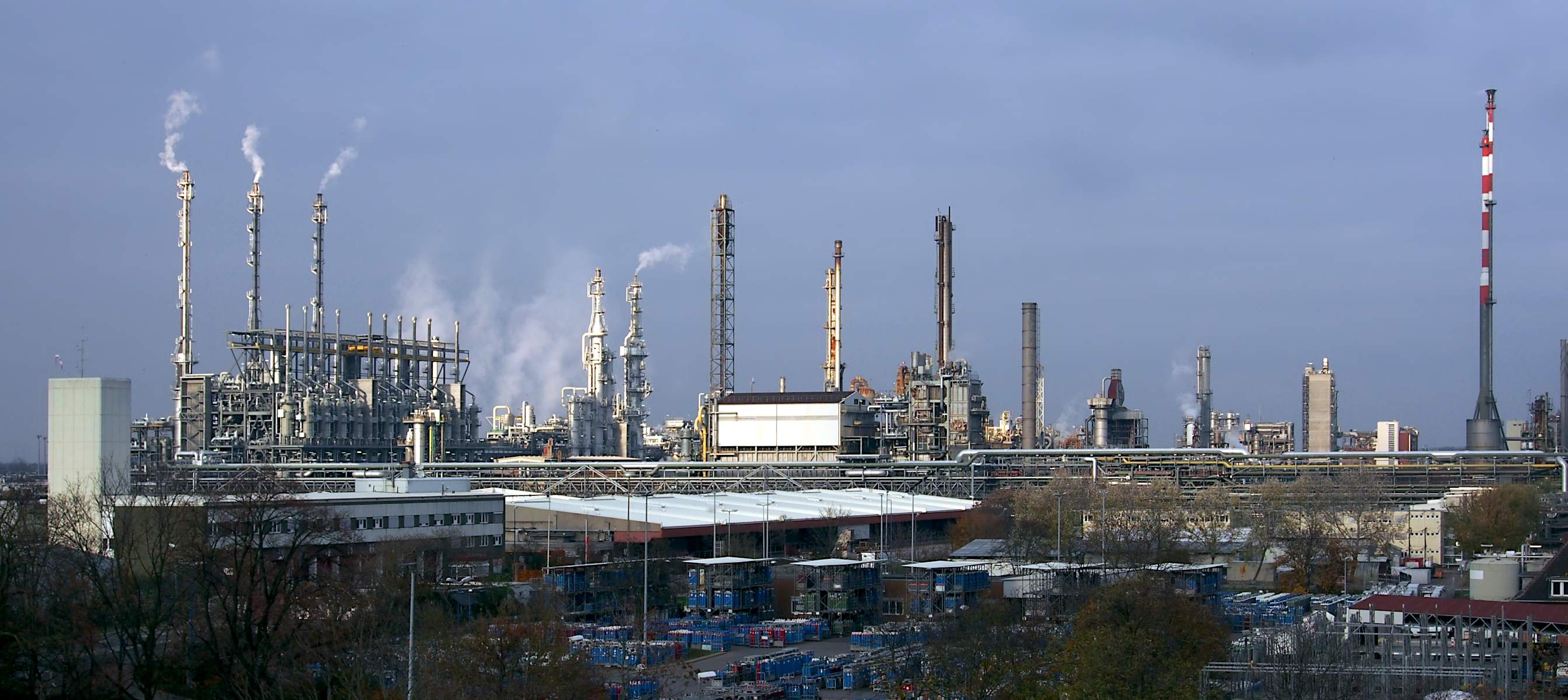
The new acetylene plant of BASF, commissioned in 2020

=== Hydrogenation ===
Acetylene can be semihydrogenated to ethylene, providing a feedstock for a variety of polyethylene plastics.

== Safety and handling ==
Acetylene is not especially toxic, but when generated from calcium carbide, or CaC_{2}, it can contain toxic impurities such as traces of phosphine and arsine, which gives it a distinct garlic-like smell. It is also highly flammable, as are most light hydrocarbons, hence its use in welding. Its most singular hazard is associated with its intrinsic instability, especially when it is pressurized: under certain conditions acetylene can react in an exothermic addition-type reaction to form a number of products, typically benzene and/or vinylacetylene, possibly in addition to carbon and hydrogen. Although it is stable at normal pressures and temperatures, if it is subjected to pressures as low as 15 psig it can explode. The safe limit for acetylene therefore is 101 kPa_{gage}, or 15 psig. Additionally, if acetylene is initiated by intense heat or a shockwave, it can decompose explosively if the absolute pressure of the gas exceeds about 200 kilopascals (29 psi). It is therefore supplied and stored dissolved in acetone or dimethylformamide (DMF), contained in a gas cylinder with a porous filling, which renders it safe to transport and use, given proper handling. Acetylene cylinders should be used in the upright position to avoid withdrawing acetone during use.

Information on safe storage of acetylene in upright cylinders is provided by the OSHA, Compressed Gas Association, United States Mine Safety and Health Administration (MSHA), EIGA, and other agencies.

Copper catalyses the decomposition of acetylene, and as a result acetylene should not be transported in copper pipes.

Cylinders should be stored in an area segregated from oxidizers to avoid exacerbated reaction in case of fire/leakage. Acetylene cylinders should not be stored in confined spaces, enclosed vehicles, or in locations where heavy moving objects may strike them, to avoid unintended leakage leading to explosive atmosphere. In the US, National Electric Code (NEC) requires consideration for hazardous areas including those where acetylene may be released during accidents or leaks. Consideration may include electrical classification and use of listed Group A electrical components in US. Further information on determining the areas requiring special consideration is in NFPA 497. In Europe, ATEX also requires consideration for hazardous areas where flammable gases may be released during accidents or leaks.
