= 2-Acrylamido-2-methylpropane sulfonic acid =

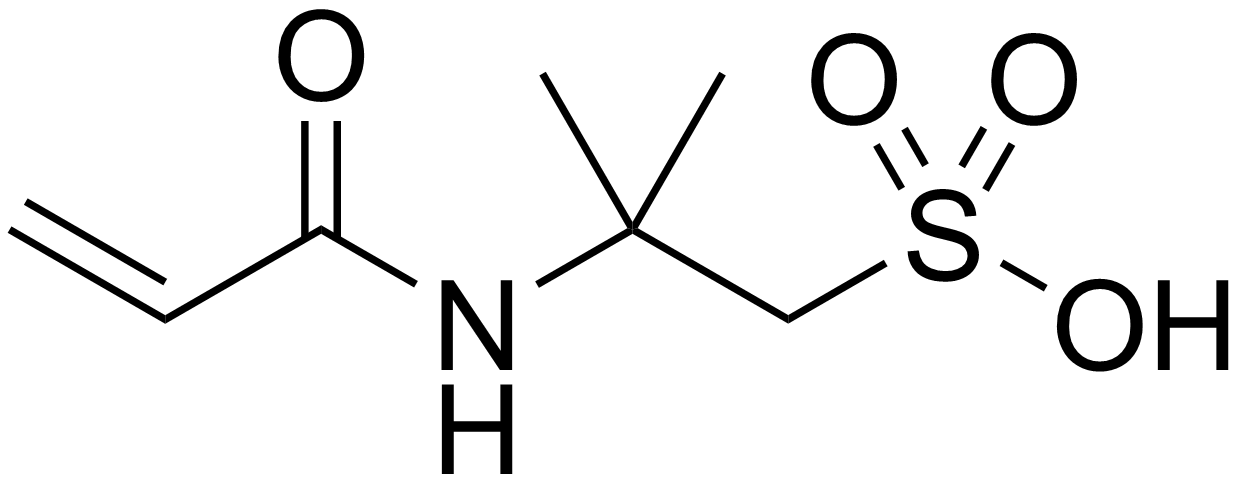

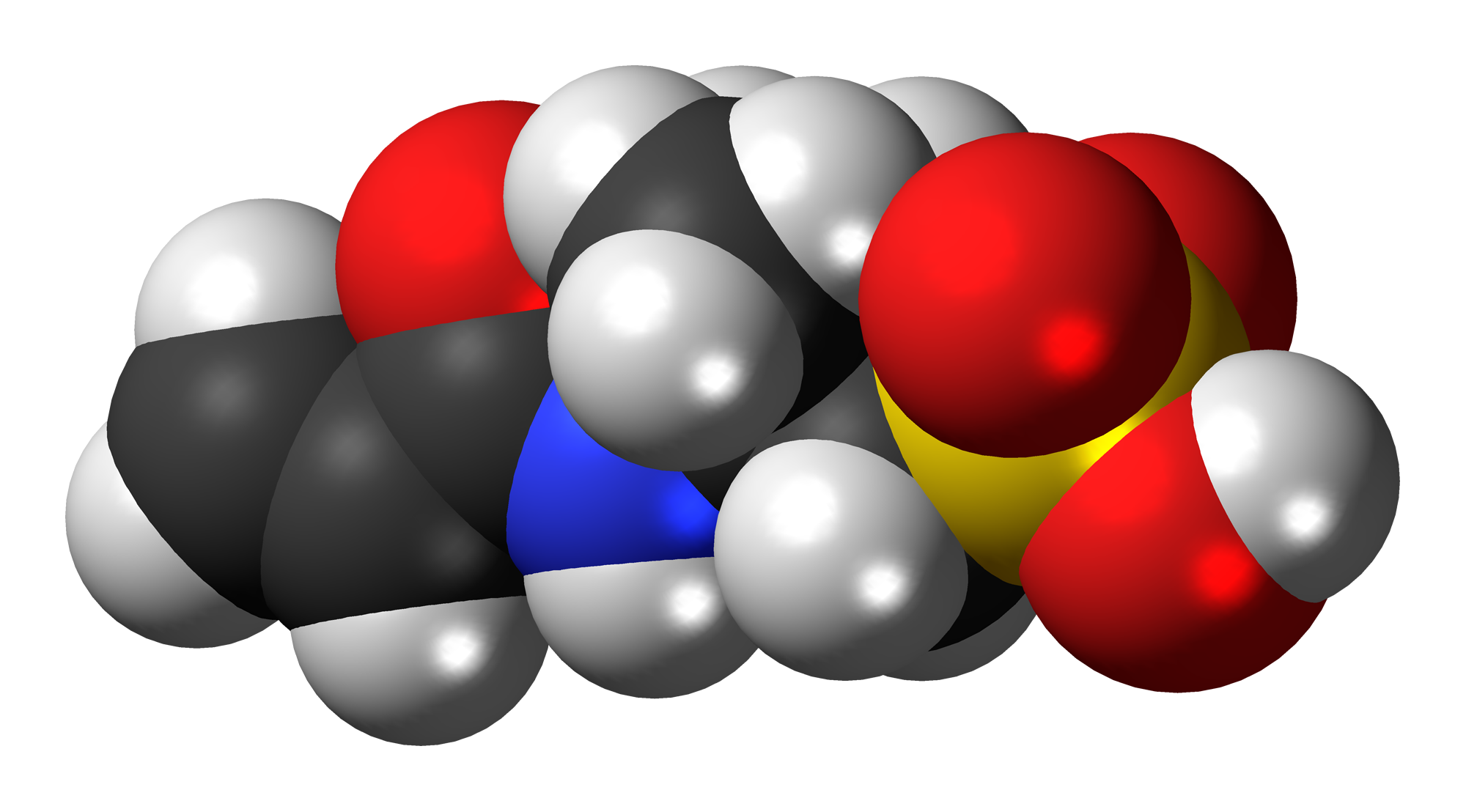

Names
- Preferred IUPAC name 2-Methyl-2-(prop-2-enamido)propane-1-sulfonic acid
- Other names 2-Acrylamido-2-methylpropane sulfonic acid; 2-Acrylamido-2-methylpropanesulfonic acid; 2-Acrylamido-2-methyl-1-propane sulfonic acid

Identifiers
CAS Number	15214-89-8
3D model (JSmol)	Interactive image
Abbreviations	AMPS
ChEMBL	ChEMBL1907040
ChemSpider	58836
ECHA InfoCard	100.035.683
EC Number	925-482-8
PubChem CID	65360
UNII	490HQE5KI5
CompTox Dashboard (EPA)	DTXSID5027770
- InChI: InChI=1S/C7H13NO4S/c1-4-6(9)8-7(2,3)5-13(10,11)12/h4H,1,5H2,2-3H3,(H,8,9)(H,10,11,12) Key: XHZPRMZZQOIPDS-UHFFFAOYSA-N; InChI=1/C7H13NO4S/c1-4-6(9)8-7(2,3)5-13(10,11)12/h4H,1,5H2,2-3H3,(H,8,9)(H,10,11,12) Key: XHZPRMZZQOIPDS-UHFFFAOYAO
- SMILES: O=C(NC(CS(=O)(=O)O)(C)C)C=C

Properties
Chemical formula	C_{7}H_{13}NO_{4}S
Molar mass	207.24 g·mol^{−1}
Appearance	White crystalline powder or granular particles
Density	1.1 g/cm^{3} (15.6 °C)
Melting point	195 °C (383 °F; 468 K)

Hazards
NFPA 704 (fire diamond)	3 0 1
- Except where otherwise noted, data are given for materials in their standard state (at 25 °C [77 °F], 100 kPa). verify (what is ?) Infobox references

2-Acrylamido-2-methylpropane sulfonic acid (AMPS) was a trademark name by The Lubrizol Corporation. It is a reactive, hydrophilic, sulfonic acid acrylic monomer used to alter the chemical properties of wide variety of anionic polymers. In the 1970s, the earliest patents using this monomer were filed for acrylic fiber manufacturing. Today, there are over several thousands patents and publications involving use of AMPS in many areas including water treatment, oil field, construction chemicals, hydrogels for medical applications, personal care products, emulsion coatings, adhesives, and rheology modifiers. Lubrizol discontinued the production of this monomer in 2017 due to copy-cat production from China and India destroying the profitability of this product.

== Production ==
AMPS is made by the Ritter reaction of acrylonitrile and isobutylene in the presence of sulfuric acid and water. The patent literature describes batch and continuous processes that produce AMPS in high purity (to 99.7%) and improved yield (up to 89%, based on isobutene) with the addition of liquid isobutene to an acrylonitrile / sulfuric acid / phosphoric acid mixture at 40 °C.

== Properties ==
- Hydrolytic and thermal stability: The geminal dimethyl group and the sulfomethyl group combine to sterically hinder the amide functionality and provide both hydrolytic and thermal stabilities to AMPS-containing polymers.
- Polarity and hydrophilicity: The sulfonate group gives the monomer a high degree of hydrophilicity and anionic character at wide range of pH. In addition, AMPS is absorbing water readily and also imparts enhanced water absorption and transport characteristics to polymers.
- Solubility: AMPS is very soluble in water and dimethylformamide (DMF) and also shows limited solubility in most polar organic solvents.

Solvent	Solubility (gAMPS/100 g solvent)
Water	150
Dimethylformamide	>100
N-Methyl-2-pyrrolidone	80
Methanol	8.7

- Inhibition of divalent cation precipitation: Sulfonic acid in AMPS is a very strong ionic group and ionizes completely in aqueous solutions. In applications where the precipitation of mineral salts is undesirable, the incorporation of a polymer containing even a small quantity of AMPS can significantly inhibit the precipitation of divalent cations. The result is a significant reduction in the precipitation of a wide variety of mineral salts, including calcium, magnesium, iron, aluminium, zinc, barium and chromium.
- Determining viscosity-average molecular weight (Mark-Houwink constants)

Na-AMPS	0.01N	0.05N	0.1N	0.5N	1.0N	5.0N
K × 10^{5}	0.67	1.47	1.67	1.32	3.34	5.01
ν	1.02	0.91	0.88	0.86	0.77	0.72

- Reactivity ratio: AMPS reacts well with a variety of vinyl monomers. M_{2}= AMPS or ^{†} sodium salt of AMPS

M_{1}	r_{1}	r_{2}	Remark
Acrylonitrile	1.2	0.7	DMF
Acrylic acid	0.74	0.19	Water, pH=7.0
Acrylic acid	1.58	0.11	Water, pH=2~4
Itaconic acid	0.46	0.04	DMF, 70 °C, Benzoyl Peroxide
Acrylamide	0.98	0.49 ^{†}	Water, K_{2}S_{2}O_{8}
Styrene	1.13	0.31	DMF, 60 °C, AIBN
Vinyl Acetate	0.05	11.60 ^{†}	Methanol, 60 °C,
N-Vinylpyrrolidone	0.13	0.66 ^{†}	60 °C, AIBN
2-hydroxyethyl methacrylate	0.86	0.90	Water, 60 °C, AIBN
2-Hydroxypropyl methacrylate	6.30	0.04	Water, 80 °C, (NH_{4})_{2}S_{2}O_{8}
N,N-Dimethylacrylamide	1.26	0.68 ^{†}	Water, 30 °C, K_{2}S_{2}O_{8}
N-Vinylformamide	0.32	0.39 ^{†}	VA-044

== Applications ==
- Acrylic fiber: A number of enhanced performance characteristics are imparted to acrylic, modified-acrylic, polypropylene and polyvinylidene fluoride fibers: dye receptivity, moisture absorbency, and static resistance.
- Coating and adhesive: Its sulfonic acid group gives the monomers ionic character over a wide range of pH. Anionic charges from AMPS fixed on polymer particles enhance the chemical and shear stabilities of polymer emulsion and also reduce the amount of surfactants leaching out of paint film. It improves the thermal and mechanical properties of adhesives, and increases the adhesive strength of pressure-sensitive adhesive formulations.
- Detergents: Enhances the washing performance of surfactants by binding multivalent cations and reducing dirt attachment.
- Personal care: Strong polar and hydrophilic properties introduced to a high molecular weight AMPS homopolymer are exploited as a very efficient lubricant characteristic for skin care.
- Medical hydrogel: High water-absorbing and swelling capacity when AMPS is introduced to a hydrogel are keys to medical applications. Hydrogel with AMPS showed uniform conductivity, low electrical impedance, cohesive strength, appropriate skin adhesion, and biocompatible and capable of repeated use and have been used to electrocardiograph (ECG) electrodes, defibrillation electrode, electrosurgical grounding pads, and iontophoretic drug delivery electrodes. In addition, polymers derived from AMPS are used as the absorbing hydrogel and the tackifier component of wound dressings. Is used due to its high water absorption and retention capability as a monomer in superabsorbents e. g. for baby diapers.
- Oil field applications: Polymers in oil field applications have to stand hostile environments and require thermal and hydrolytic stability and the resistance to hard water containing metal ions. For example, in drilling operations where conditions of high salinity, high temperature and high pressure are present, AMPS copolymers can inhibit fluid loss and be used in oil field environments as scale inhibitors, friction reducers and water-control polymers, and in polymer flooding applications.
- Water treatment applications: The cation stability of the AMPS-containing polymers are very useful for water treatment processes. Such polymers with low molecular weights cannot only inhibit calcium, magnesium, and silica scale in cooling towers and boilers, but also help corrosion control by dispersing iron oxide. When high molecular weight polymers are used, they can be used to precipitate solids in the treatment of industrial effluent stream.
- Crop protection: increases in dissolved and nanoparticulate polymer formulations bioavailability of pesticides in aqueous-organic formulations.
- Membranes: It increases water flow, retention and fouling resistance of asymmetric ultrafiltration and microfiltration membranes and is being studied as an anionic component in polymer fuel cell membranes.
- Construction applications: Superplasticizers with AMPS are used to reduce water in concrete formulations. Benefits of these additives include improved strength, improved workability, improved durability of cement mixtures. Redispersible polymer powder, when AMPS is introduced, in cement mixtures control air pore content and prevent agglomeration of powders during the spray-drying process from the powder manufacturing and storage. Coating formulations with AMPS-containing polymers prevent calcium ions from being formed as lime on concrete surface and improve the appearance and durability of coating.

== See also ==
- PolyAMPS
- Hydrogel
