= Hydrogel fiber =

Hydrogel made into a fibrous state

Hydrogel fiber is a hydrogel made into a fibrous state, where its width is significantly smaller than its length. The hydrogel's specific surface area at fibrous form is larger than that of the bulk hydrogel, and its mechanical properties also changed accordingly. As a result of these changes, hydrogel fiber has a faster matter exchange rate and can be woven into different structures.

As a water swollen network with usually low toxicity, hydrogel fiber can be used in a variety of biomedical applications such as drug carrier, optical sensor, and actuator.

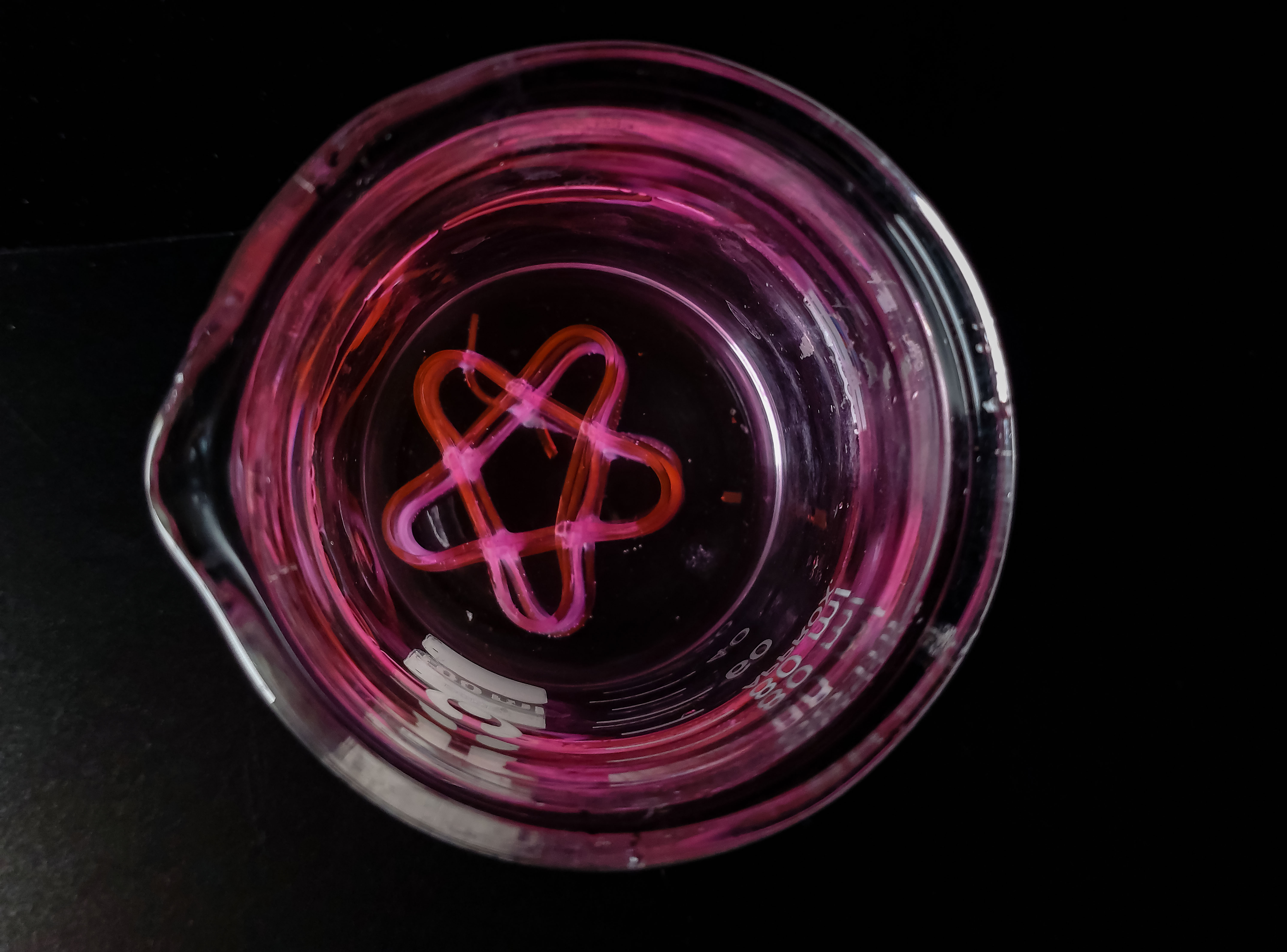
A pentagram made from hydrogel fiber.

But the production of hydrogel fiber can be challenging as the hydrogel is crosslinked and can not be shaped into a fibrous state after polymerization. To make hydrogel into a fibrous state, the pregel solution must be made into fibrous form and then crosslinked while maintaining this shape.

== Production method ==
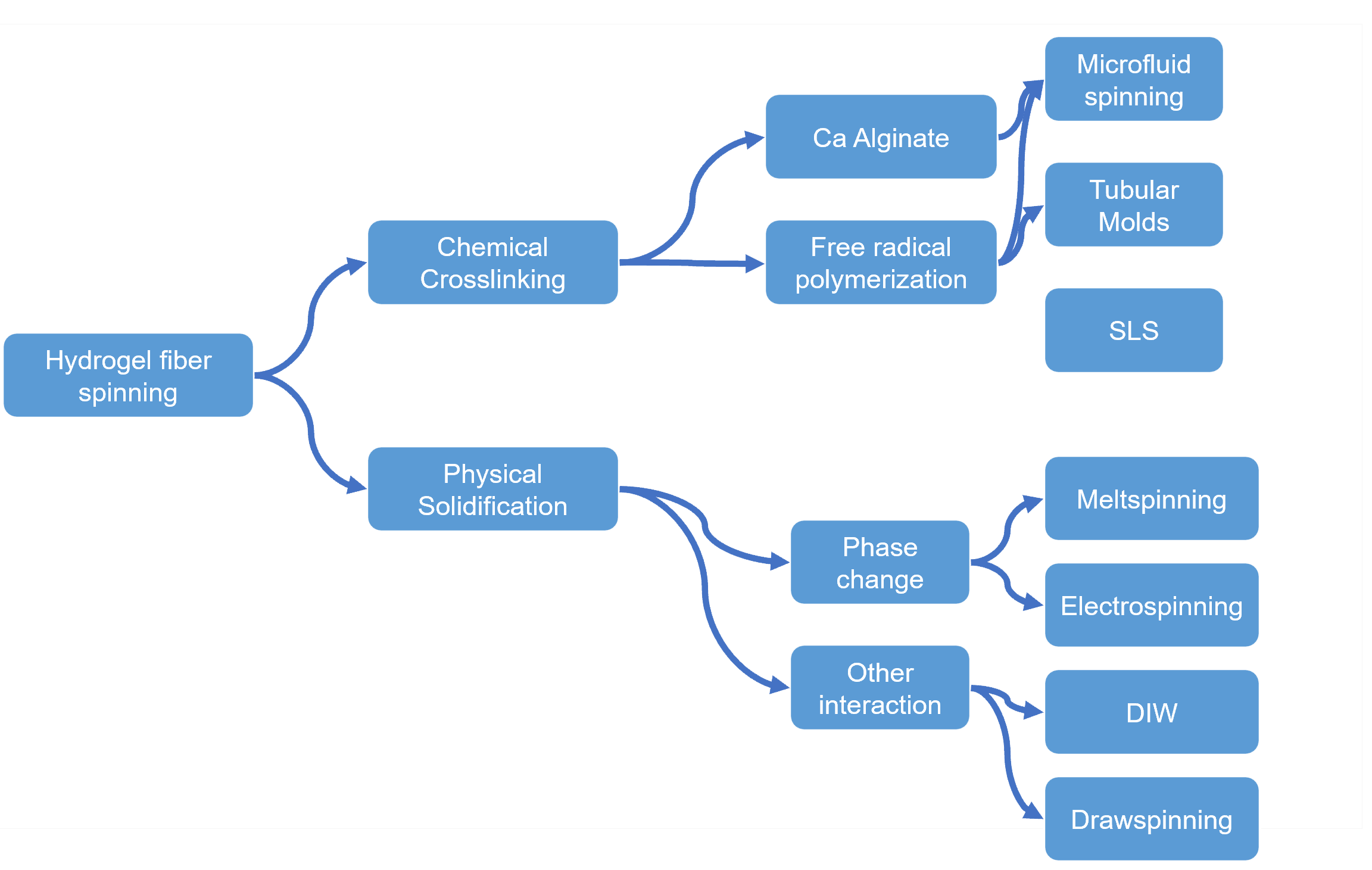
The schematic summary of the production method

To produce hydrogel fiber, the solidification of the pregel solution is the most important step. The pregel solution needs to be solidified while maintaining its fibrous shape. To achieve this, several methods based on chemical crosslinking, phase change, rheological property change have been developed.

=== Physical solidification based ===
Change in physical interactions can be utilized for the solidification process, and the fibrous state is usually achieved outside of the extrusion nozzle. Due to the reversibility of those physical interactions, subsequent crosslinking is traditionally required.

==== Electrospinning ====
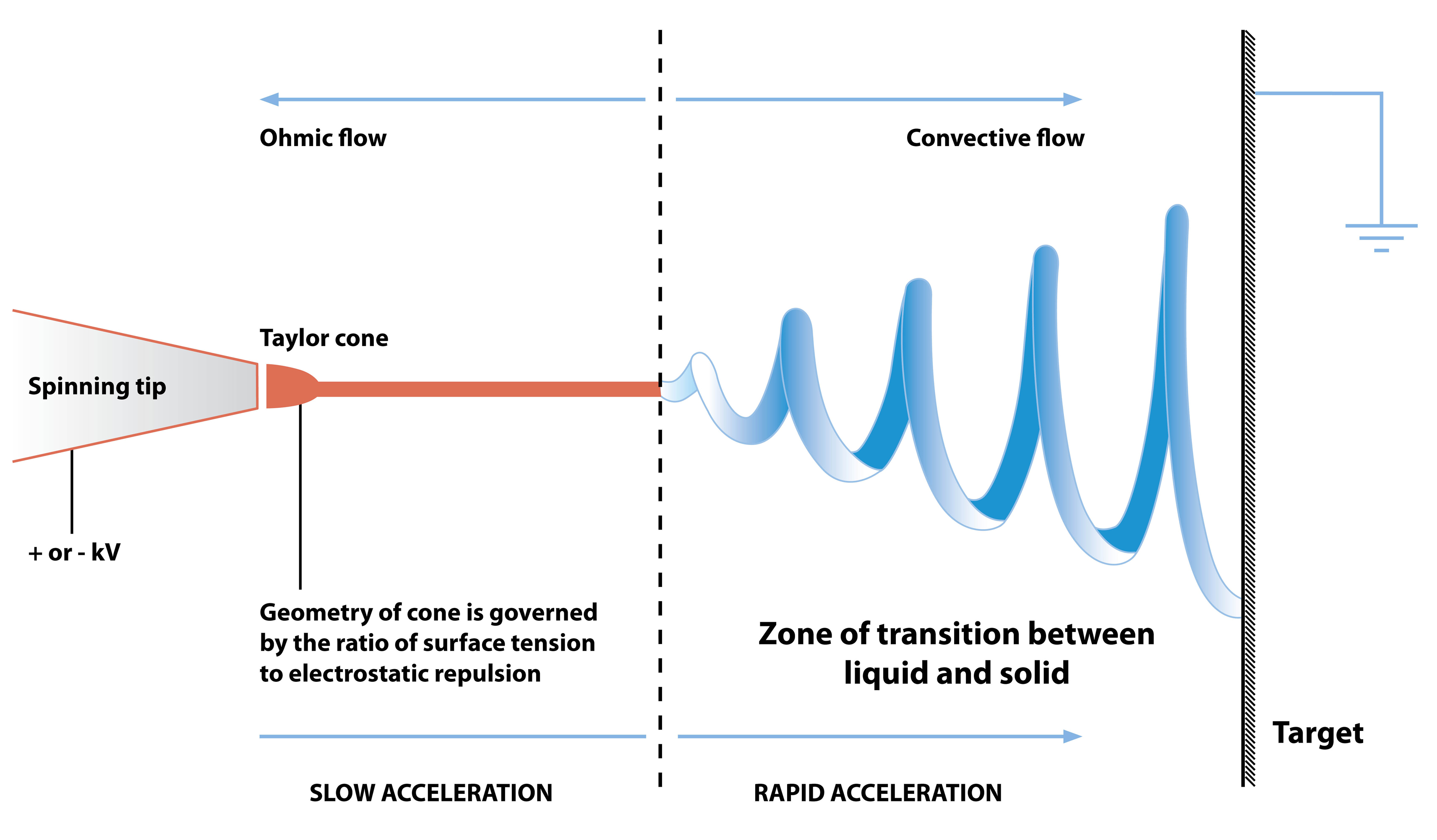
Solidification during electrospinning.

Hydrogel fiber can be produced by electrospinning with solidification done by the evaporation of the solvent. The fibrous state is created by the combination of electrostatic repulsion and the surface tension of the solution. But subsequent crosslinking is usually needed to form a crosslinked network. One advantage of electrospun hydrogel fiber is that it has a diameter in range in the order between nm to μm, which is desirable for fast matter exchange. However, utilization of single fiber can be hard to achieve due to the weak mechanical strength of the microscopic fiber and its entanglements after production.

An example of this method would be the production of polyacrylamide (PAAM) semi-interpretation network developed by Tahchi et al. Where the first linear PAAM (provide solidification) was mixed with AAM monomer (form subsequent network) and crosslinker N,N′-methylenebisacrylamide (MBA). During the electrospinning process, the linear PAAM provided the required physical properties to achieve electrospinning, while the AAM monomer and MBA crosslinker were used to form a second crosslinked network inside the PAAM fiber. Although no crosslinking was formed between the first and second networks, the physical entanglement will prevent linear PAAM from leaking.

==== Drawspinning ====
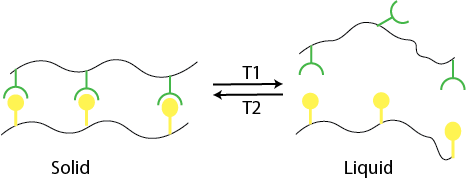
A schematic illustration of supermolecular crosslinking.

Through supramolecular chemistry, pregel solution can solidify through reversible supramolecular interactions such as host-guest interactions. Such interaction can be manipulated through the mechanical force or the temperature. When energy exerted to the network is high enough, physical crosslinking point will break and the polymer will be at liquid state, after leaving the nozzle, the crosslinking can be rapidly formed to solidify the solution.

A case would be the Host–Guest Chemistry reported by Scherman et al. Where the formation of inclusion complex between Cucurbit[8]uril and 1-benzyl-3-vinylimidazolium bromide (BVIm) formed physical crosslinking point for the network. The formation of this physical crosslinking point is controlled by the temperature of the solution. By heating up the solution and cooling it down rapidly at extrusion nuzzle, the hydogel fiber is formed. Also, subsequent crosslinking is performed to form a perment network.

==== Meltspinning ====
Some hydrophilic polymer can be made into hydrogel fiber via melt-spinning method, where the solidification is done by the phase transition from the molten state. Similar to the electro-spinning, the pregel solution was kept liquid in the container. After leaving the nuzzle at filament state, the fiber solidified after the encounter of cool ambient air and maintained their shape.

An example would be the meltspinning apparatus built by Long et al., where meltspinning of polylactic acid (PLA) and polycaprolactone (PCL) fiber are achieved.

==== Direct ink writing ====
Similar to the draw spinning technique the direct ink writing technique utilized reversible physical solidification to produce hydrogel fibers. The pregel solution was liqufied through shear thinning process which can be generated by adding microscopic particles such as mircrogel. After leaving the nuzzle, the hydrogel will solidify and retain their shape, and network will be made perment after crosslinking.

An example would be the production of the fiber developed by Lewis et al. Where Silk fibroin was used to generate the desired shear-thinning properties. And the network was formed when the solvent was subsequently changed.

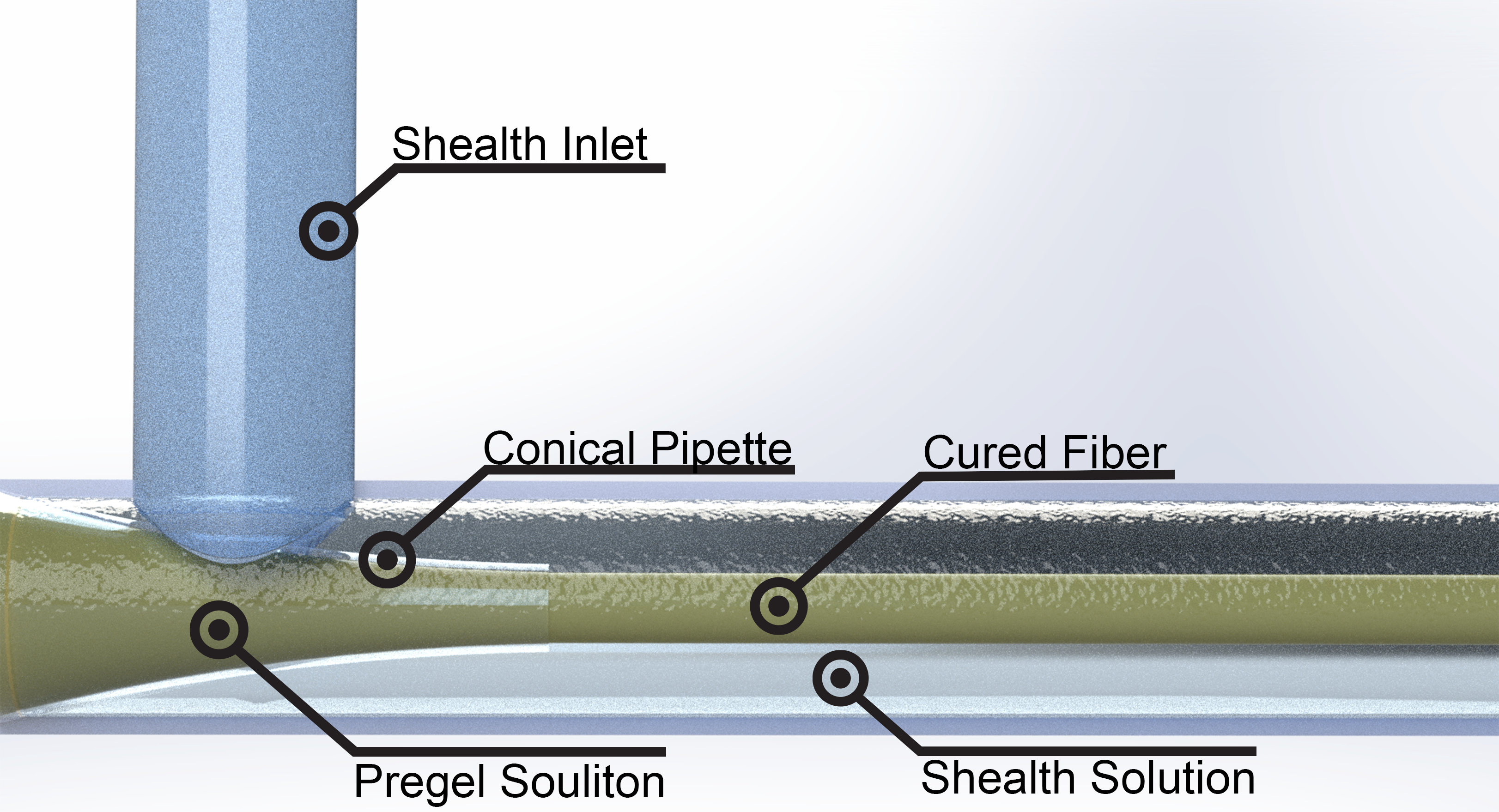
A schematic presentation of a typical microfluid spinning device.

=== Chemical crosslink based ===
Similar to physical solidification, some chemical crosslinking methods have been developed to produce hydrogel fibers. And the key for the achievement of hydrogel production through the chemical crosslinking method is the effective separation between the formed network and the tube wall.

==== Microfluid spinning ====
Many microfluid device-based methods have been developed to produce hydrogel fibers.

===== Crosslinking of alginate =====
One of the most commonly used fiber production methods is the crosslinking of sodium alginate by CaCl_{2}, where the formed calcium alginate will act as the crosslinking point to link the alginate chains together to form the network and solidified the polymer. Afterward, this alginate hydrogel fiber can be used as a template for the polymerization of secondary networks. Additionally, by controlling the fluid dynamics inside the microfluid device, the diameter and the shape of the resulting fiber can be tuned without doing modification to the devices.

A practice would be the production of alginate solution reported by Yang et al. They used the sodium alginate as core fluid and CaCl_{2} as shealth fluid, the crosslinked network (hydrogel fiber) formed once this two fluid met, the laminar flow kept its tubular shape during the reaction.

===== Photoinitiated crosslinking =====
Other photoinitiated free radical polymerization reactions can also be used for fiber production. In this case, the shealth fluid was only used to separate the core fluid from the tube wall. Also, to achieve the solidification rapid enough, a more concentrated monomer solution was usually used.

An example would be the production of 4-hydroxybutyl acrylate fiber reported by Beebe et al. The microfluid device they used was built with ethylvinyl acetate caplliary and PDMS rubber. The core fluid was a mixture of 4-hydroxybutyl acrylate, acrylic acid, ethyleneglycol dimethacrylate (crosslinker), 2,2′-dimethoxy-2-phenyl-acetonephenone (photoinitiator). The sheath fluid was only for separation. The crosslinked network was formed by free radical polymerization when the UV light met the core fluid.

==== Polymerization in tubular molds ====
Although only being able to produce short hydrogel fibers, production of hydrogel fiber by polymerizing the hydrogel network inside a tubular mold and push out the fiber forcefully can also be achieved. But the friction will increase with the increasing length, and only short hydrogel fibers are feasible.

A case would be the production of poly(acrylamide-co-poly(ethylene glycol) diacrylate) fiber reported by yun et al. The pregel solution was a mixture of AAM, poly(ethylene glycol) diacrylate (PEGDA, crosslinker), and 2-hydroxy-2-methylpropiophenone (photoinitiator). The mixture was injected into a tubular mold and extracted through hydrostatic force afterwards.

==== Self-lubricate spinning ====
An interesting phenomenon called self-lubricate spinning can facilitate the demolding of the fiber and enables the continuous production of hydrogel fiber from tubular mold. During the polymerization process, if an inert second polymer is present, it will be particularly expelled from the formed network and being able to move with relative ease. The linear polymer on the surface of the crosslinked network also contains water solvent due to the osmic pressure, thus, a lubrication layer is formed. Therefore, the solidified polymer fiber can exit the tube with decreased friction force and continuous production can be achieved.

An example would be the production the PAAM/PAMPS semi-interpenetration network hydrogel fiber reported by Zhao et al. The pregel solution was the mixture of PAMPS, AAM, PEGDA (crosslinker), and 2-hydroxy-4'-(2-hydroxyethoxy)-2-methylpropiophenone (photoinitiator). The pregel solution was fed into a PTFE tube at a constant speed, with UV light being used to initiate the reaction.

== Characterization methods ==
=== Surface morphology ===
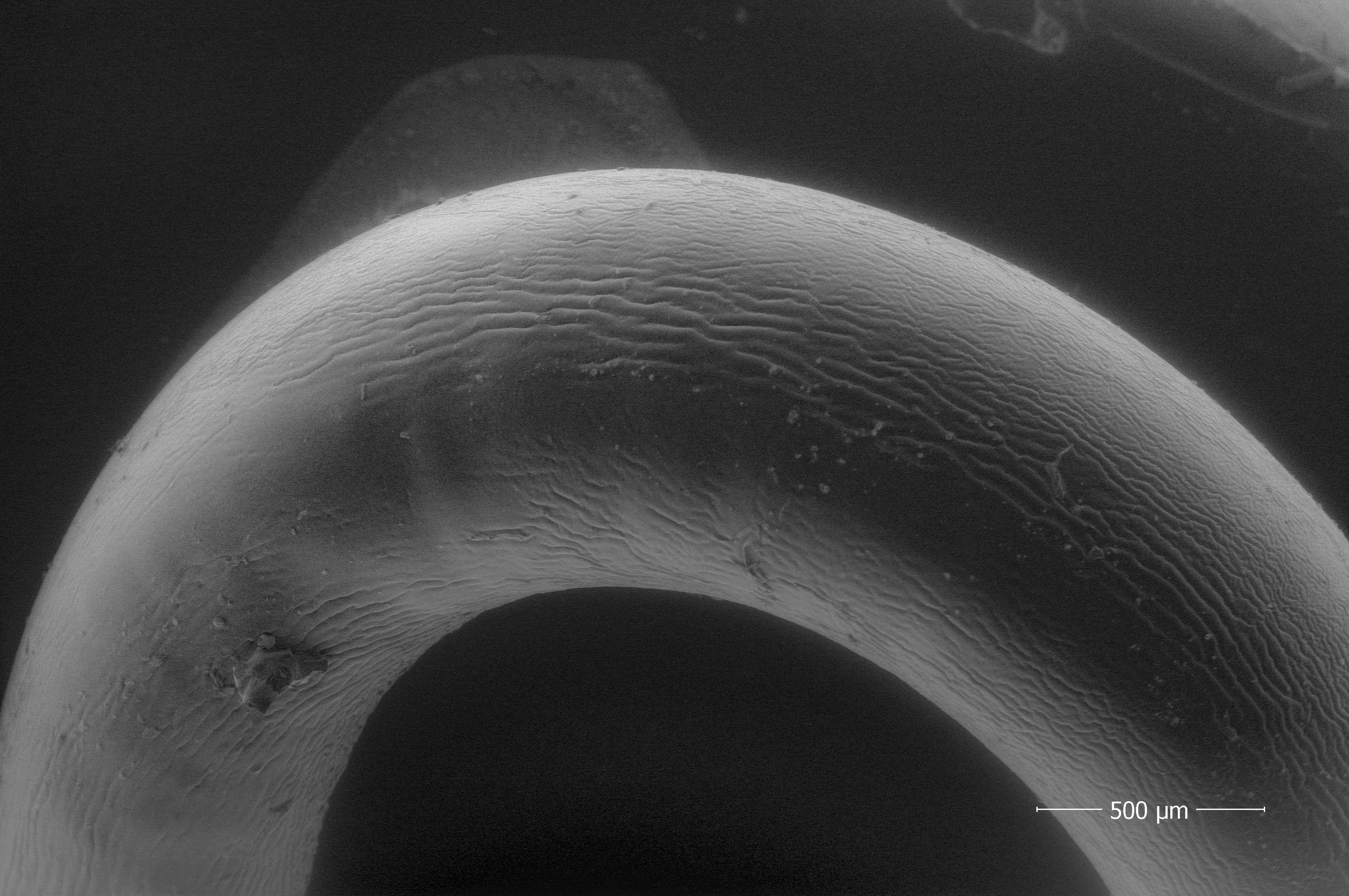
ESEM Image of hydrogel fiber

The surface morphology and shape of the cross-section can be observed via scanning electron microscope (SEM) imaging after removal of solvent. Also, environmental scanning electron microscope (ESEM) can be used to observe wet hydrogel fibers. But different treatments will affect the surface morphology of the hydrogel fiber drastically. If the hydrogel fiber was dried directly, a smooth surface would be obtained because of the collapse of the polymer network after the removal of the solvent. If the hydrogel fiber was lyophilized, a porous surface will usually be found due to the pore-forming effect of the ice crystal. ESEM can directly observe the surface morphology. The resulting image usually indicates a smooth surface with some wrinkled formed due to the gradual loss of water.

=== Mechanical properties ===
The mechanical properties of the fibers are tested, but the process can be tricky due to practical reasons. The mechanical properties are tested with Universal Test Machine by fixing the hydrogel fibers between two holders. However, due to the compress of the holder, hydrogel fiber might have a trend to break at the holding point. Also, the loss of water during the test will impact the resulting data, and precaution needs to be taken to meditate the loss. And the tensile strength of the hydrogel fiber is usually smaller than 1 MPa.

=== Optical properties ===
Optical properties are tested for optical sensing-related applications. This can include light attenuation, refractive index, transmission, etc. These optical properties are significantly influenced by the composition of the hydrogel.

=== Biocompatibility ===
Cell toxicity tests are performed for applications such as cell growth scaffolds. By growing the cell with the ability to produce fluorescent protein, the growth of the cell can be monitored with fluorescent imaging techniques.

== Applications ==
=== Optical fiber sensors ===
Transparent hydrogel fibers can be used as optical fiber, and stimuli-responsive functional groups can be grafted on to create optical sensors. For example, in the research done by Yun et al. the glucose-sensitive phenylboronic acid was grafted onto the polymer network. When the glucose concentration changes, the adsorption of the phenylboronic acid will change accordingly and can be recorded with the light intensity at a certain wavelength.

=== Additive manufacture ===
Although suffering from poor mechanical strength, some approach has been made to construct hydrogel fiber with textile methods. Also, the electrospun, meltspun, DIW method can produce hydrogel fiber structures at higher dimensions directly.

=== Biomedical scaffolds ===
Hydrogel fiber can be used to fabricate scaffolds for cell growth and drug release.

=== Actuators ===
Stimuli-responsive hydrogel fibers can be used as actuators and soft robots. By braiding the hydrogel fiber together, the force of the single fiber can be magnified. Also, due to the slipping between hydrogel fibers, the stain of the bending can be reduced to further enhance the performance.
