= PolyAMPS =

Polymer

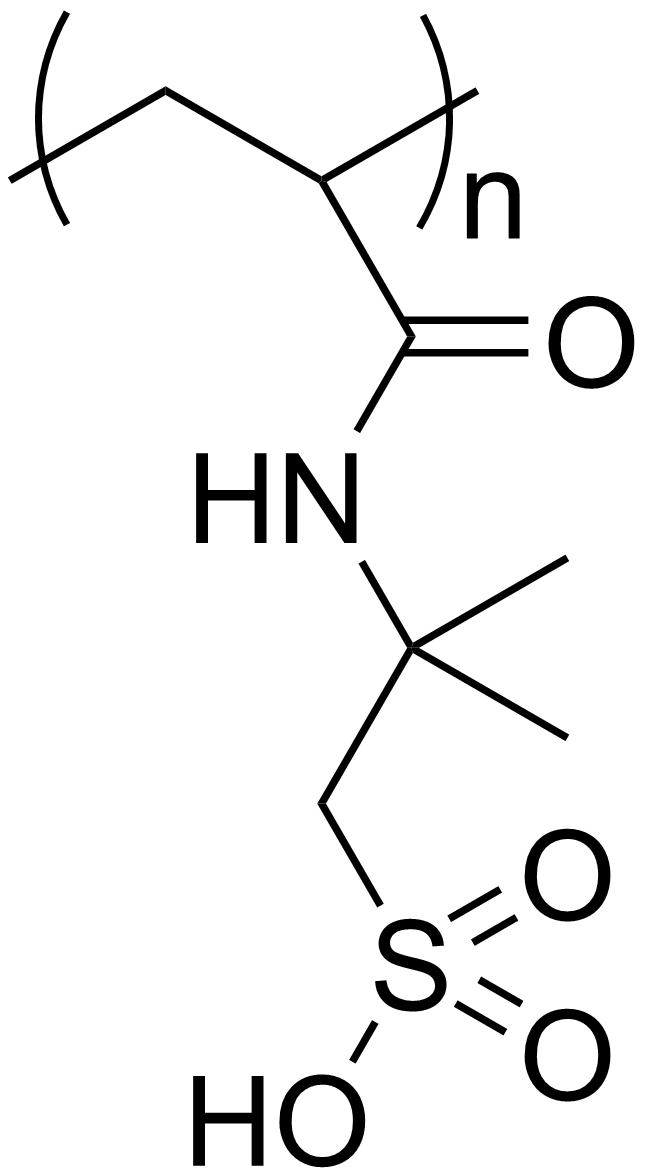
Chemical structure of polyAMPS

PolyAMPS, or poly(2-acrylamido-2-methyl-1-propanesulfonic acid) (AMPS being a trademark of the Lubrizol Corporation), is an organic polymer. It is water-soluble, forms gels when cross linked, and acts as a strong anionic polyelectrolyte. It can be used for ion exchange resins, and can form hydrogels.

== See also ==
- 2-Acrylamido-2-methylpropane sulfonic acid (AMPS)
