= Skin appendage =

Anatomical term

Skin appendages

Details
- System: Integumentary system

Identifiers
- Latin: adnexa cutis
- TH: H3.12.00.3.00001
- FMA: 71012

Skin appendages (or adnexa of skin) are anatomical skin-associated structures that serve a particular function including sensation, contractility, lubrication and heat loss in animals. In humans, some of the more common skin appendages are hairs (sensation, heat loss, filter for breathing, protection), arrector pilli (smooth muscles that pull hairs straight), sebaceous glands (secrete sebum onto hair follicle, which oils the hair), sweat glands (can secrete sweat with strong odour (apocrine) or with a faint odour (merocrine or eccrine), and nails (protection).

Skin appendages are derived from the skin, and are usually adjacent to it.

== Glands ==
- Sweat glands are distributed all over the body except nipples and outer genitals. Although the nipples do have the mammary glands, these are known as modified sweat glands.
- Sebaceous glands are typically found in the opening shafts of hair. They are not on the palms of the hands or the soles of the feet. These glands secrete an antibacterial moisture known as sebum fluid. The sebum also softens the hands. The secretion activity is related to hormonal release. If acne is occurring, it is because these gland ducts are blocked.
- Eccrine (merocrine) glands are most common. The secretions are very watery that contain some electrolytes
- Apocrine glands produce a fatty secretion, thus giving away an odorous smell. These are located in the inguinal and axillary regions of the body, and include the mammary glands.
