= N-Vinylpyrrolidone =

2-Pyrrolidone
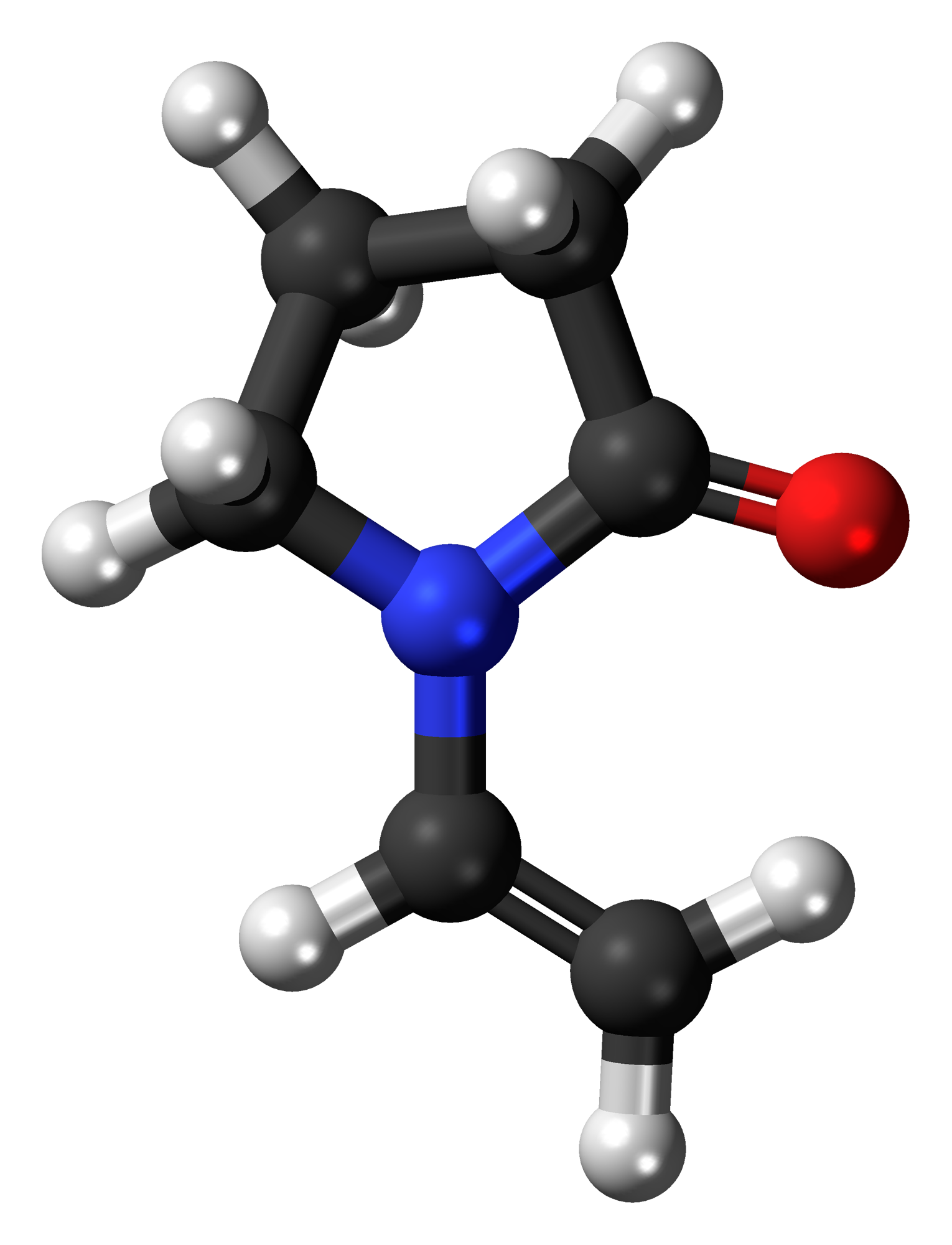

Names
- Preferred IUPAC name 1-Ethenylpyrrolidin-2-one
- Other names 1-Vinylpyrrolidin-2-one; 1-Ethenyl-2-pyrrolidone; N-Ethenyl-2-pyrrolidone; N-Vinyl-2-pyrrolidone; 1-Vinyl-2-pyrrolidone; N-Vinylbutyrolactam

Identifiers
| CAS Number | 88-12-0 |
| 3D model (JSmol) | Interactive image |
| ChemSpider | 6651 |
| ECHA InfoCard | 100.001.637 |
| PubChem CID | 6917 |
| UNII | 76H9G81541 |
| CompTox Dashboard (EPA) | DTXSID2021440 |
- InChI: InChI=1S/C6H9NO/c1-2-7-5-3-4-6(7)8/h2H,1,3-5H2 Key: WHNWPMSKXPGLAX-UHFFFAOYSA-N; InChI=1/C6H9NO/c1-2-7-5-3-4-6(7)8/h2H,1,3-5H2 Key: WHNWPMSKXPGLAX-UHFFFAOYAI
- SMILES: O=C1N(C=C)CCC1

Properties
| Chemical formula | C_{6}H_{9}NO |
| Molar mass | 111.144 g·mol^{−1} |
| Density | 1.04 g/cm^{3} |
| Melting point | 13–14 °C (55–57 °F; 286–287 K) |
| Boiling point | 92–95 °C (198–203 °F; 365–368 K) 11 mmHg |
| Vapor pressure | 0.1 mmHg (24 °C) |
| Refractive index (n_{D}) | 1.512 |

Hazards
| Flash point | 95 °C (203 °F; 368 K) |
| Autoignition temperature | 685 °C (1,265 °F; 958 K) |
- Except where otherwise noted, data are given for materials in their standard state (at 25 °C [77 °F], 100 kPa). verify (what is ?) Infobox references

N-Vinylpyrrolidone (NVP) is an organic compound consisting of a 5-membered lactam ring linked to a (2 carbon) vinyl group. It is a colorless liquid although commercial samples can appear yellowish.

It is produced industrially by vinylation of 2-pyrrolidone, i.e. the base-catalyzed reaction with acetylene. It is the precursor to polyvinylpyrrolidone (PVP), an important synthetic material. The NVP monomer is commonly used as a reactive diluent in ultraviolet and electron-beam curable polymers applied as inks, coatings or adhesives.

== Synthesis ==
Starting from γ-Butyrolactone, 2-pyrrolidone is synthesized by treatment with ammonia. Subsequently, acetylene is used to introduce the vinyl group.

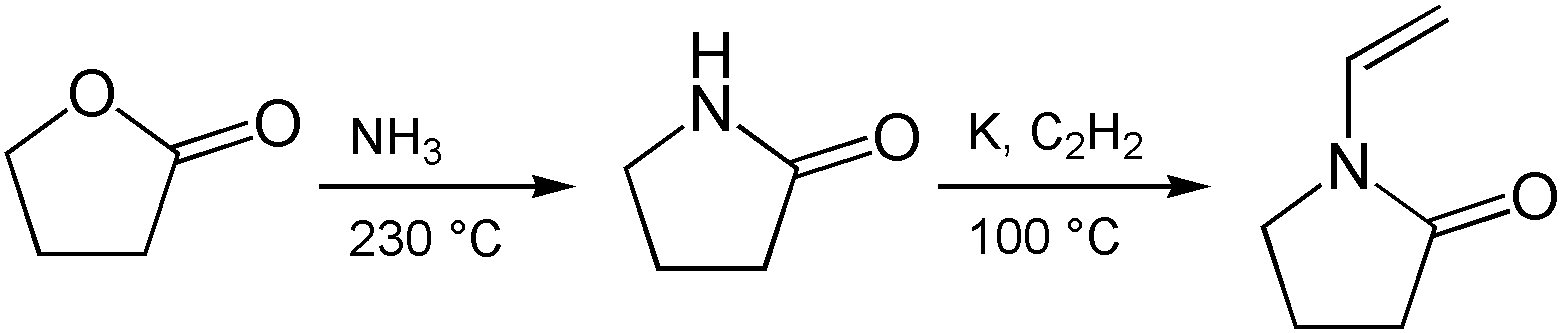
Synthesis of N-vinyl-2-pyrrolidone

== See also ==
- Methylpyrrolidone (NMP)
- 2-Pyrrolidone (2-Py)
