= Vinyl formate =

Identifiers
CAS Number	692-45-5
3D model (JSmol)	Interactive image
ChemSpider	193133
ECHA InfoCard	100.010.665
EC Number	211-730-6
PubChem CID	222465
UNII	LFS2HF6ZYT
CompTox Dashboard (EPA)	DTXSID20219233
- InChI: InChI=1S/C3H4O2/c1-2-5-3-4/h2-3H,1H2 Key: GFJVXXWOPWLRNU-UHFFFAOYSA-N
- SMILES: C=COC=O

Properties
Chemical formula	C_{3}H_{4}O_{2}
Molar mass	72.063 g·mol^{−1}
Appearance	colorless liquid
Density	0.963 g/cm^{3}
Boiling point	46.8–47.0 °C (116.2–116.6 °F; 319.9–320.1 K)
- Except where otherwise noted, data are given for materials in their standard state (at 25 °C [77 °F], 100 kPa). Infobox references

Vinyl formate is an organic compound with the formula CH_{2}=CHO_{2}CH. It is the ester formally derived from formic acid and vinyl alcohol. Although rare commercially, it occurs naturally. It can be prepared by transvinylation, say by treating vinyl versatate with formic acid in the presence of a mercury(II) catalyst..
