= Hydrogel =

Soft water-rich polymer gel

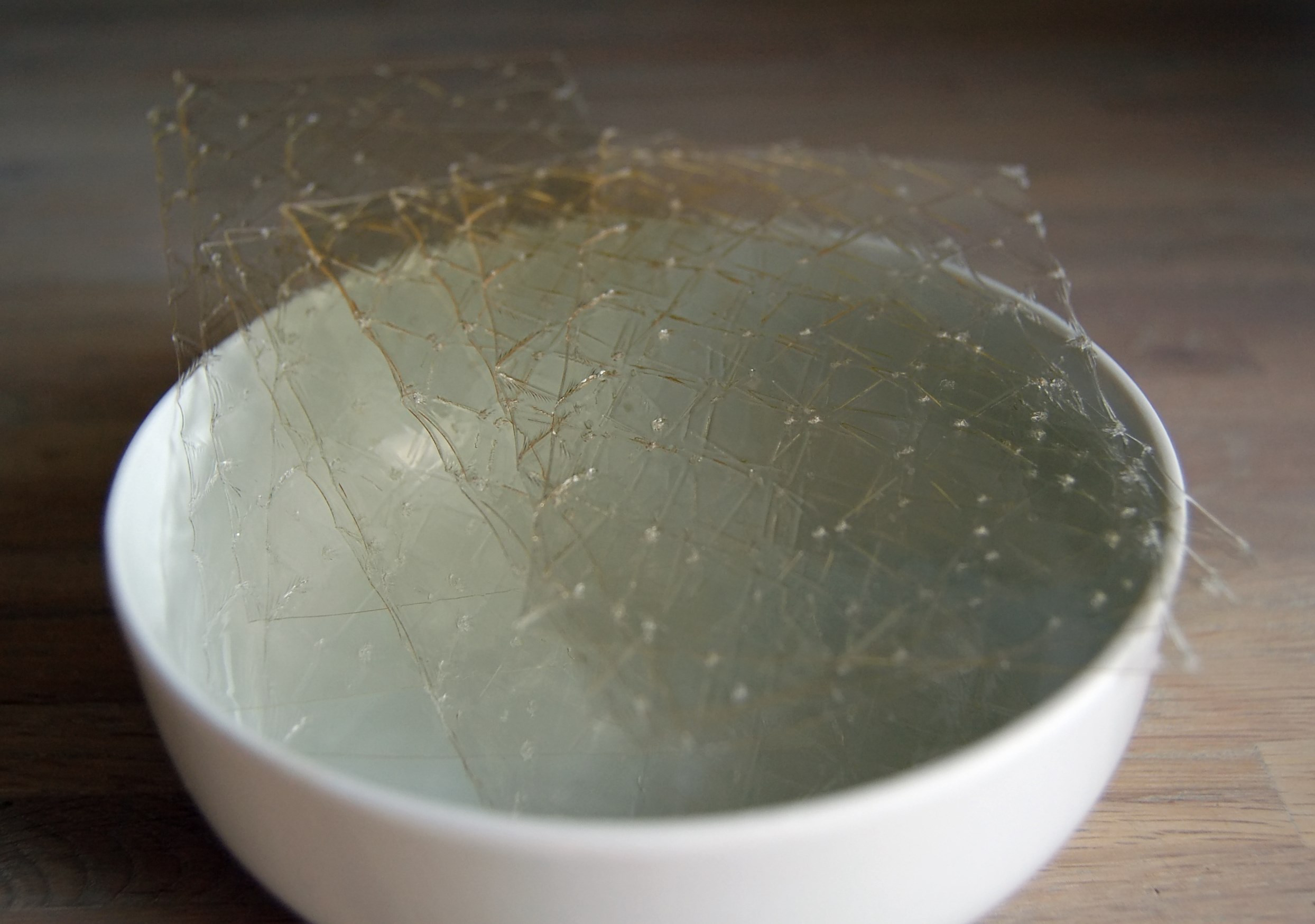
Gelatin, here in sheets for cooking, is a hydrogel.

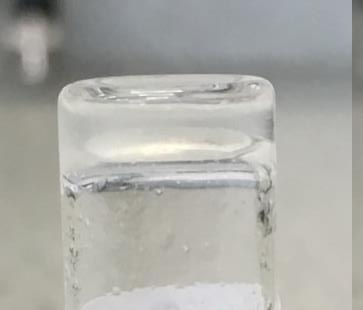
Peptide hydrogel formation shown by the inverted vial method.

A hydrogel is a biphasic material, a mixture of porous and permeable solids and at least 10% of water or other interstitial fluid. The solid phase is a water insoluble three dimensional network of polymers, having absorbed a large amount of water or biological fluids. Hydrogels have several applications, especially in the biomedical area, such as in hydrogel dressing. Many hydrogels are synthetic, but some are derived from natural materials. The term "hydrogel" was coined in 1894.

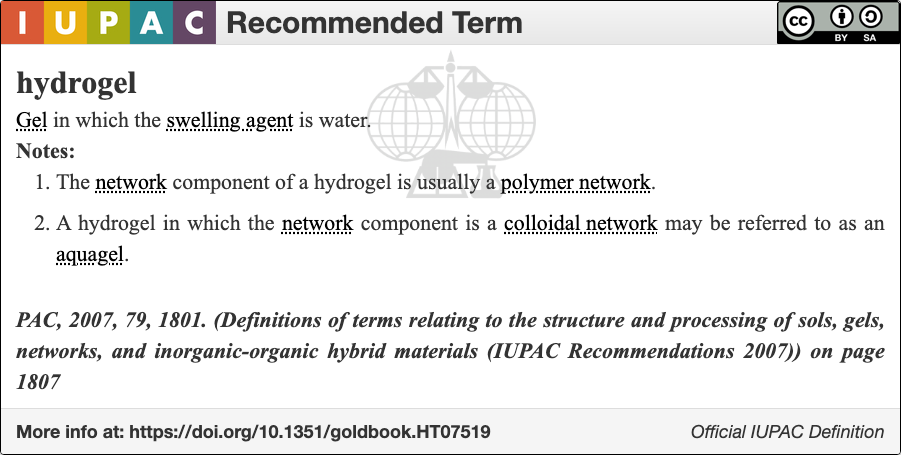
IUPAC definition for a hydrogel

== Chemistry ==
=== Classification ===
The crosslinks which bond the polymers of a hydrogel fall under two general categories: physical hydrogels and chemical hydrogels. Chemical hydrogels have covalent cross-linking bonds, whereas physical hydrogels have non-covalent bonds. Chemical hydrogels can result in strong reversible or irreversible gels due to the covalent bonding. Chemical hydrogels that contain reversible covalent cross-linking bonds, such as hydrogels of thiomers being cross-linked via disulfide bonds, are non-toxic and are used in numerous medicinal products. Physical hydrogels usually have high biocompatibility, are not toxic, and are also easily reversible by simply changing an external stimulus such as pH, ion concentration (alginate) or temperature (gelatine); they are also used for medical applications. Physical crosslinks consist of hydrogen bonds, hydrophobic interactions, and chain entanglements (among others). A hydrogel generated through the use of physical crosslinks is sometimes called a 'reversible' hydrogel. Chemical crosslinks consist of covalent bonds between polymer strands. Hydrogels generated in this manner are sometimes called 'permanent' hydrogels.

Hydrogels are prepared using a variety of polymeric materials, which can be divided broadly into two categories according to their origin: natural or synthetic polymers. Natural polymers for hydrogel preparation include hyaluronic acid, chitosan, heparin, alginate, gelatin and fibrin. Common synthetic polymers include polyvinyl alcohol, polyethylene glycol, sodium polyacrylate, acrylate polymers and copolymers thereof. Whereas natural hydrogels are usually non-toxic, and often provide other advantages for medical use, such as biocompatibility, biodegradability, antibiotic/antifungal effect and improve regeneration of nearby tissue, their stability and strength is usually much lower than synthetic hydrogels. There are also synthetic hydrogels that can be used for medical applications, such as polyethylene glycol (PEG), polyacrylate, and polyvinylpyrrolidone (PVP).

=== Preparation ===
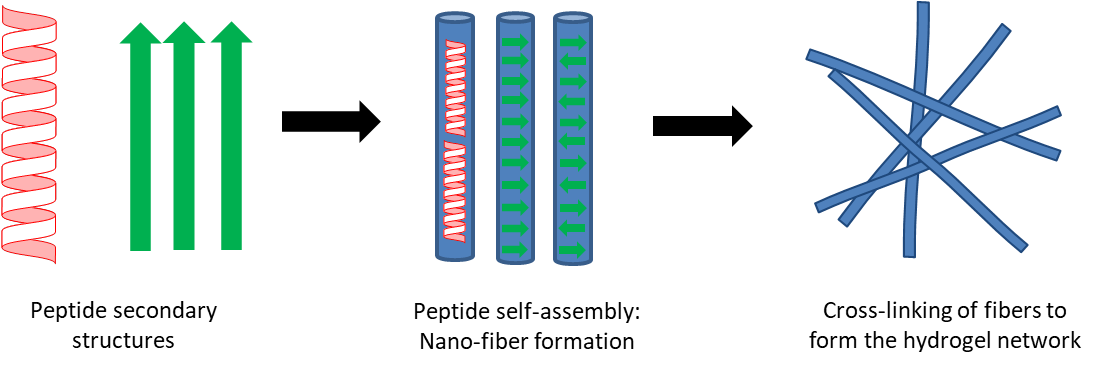
Simplified scheme to show the self-assembly process involved in hydrogel formation.

There are two suggested mechanisms behind physical hydrogel formation, the first one being the gelation of nanofibrous peptide assemblies, usually observed for oligopeptide precursors. The precursors self-assemble into fibers, tapes, tubes, or ribbons that entangle to form non-covalent cross-links. The second mechanism involves non-covalent interactions of cross-linked domains that are separated by water-soluble linkers, and this is usually observed in longer multi-domain structures. Tuning of the supramolecular interactions to produce a self-supporting network that does not precipitate, and is also able to immobilize water is vital for gel formation. Most oligopeptide hydrogels have a β-sheet structure, and assemble to form fibers, although α-helical peptides have also been reported. In a typical mechanism of gelation, oligopeptide precursors self-assemble into fibers that become elongated, and entangle to form cross-linked gels.

One notable method of initiating a polymerization reaction involves the use of light as a stimulus. In this method, photoinitiators, compounds that cleave from the absorption of photons, are added to the precursor solution which will become the hydrogel. When the precursor solution is exposed to a concentrated source of light, usually ultraviolet irradiation, the photoinitiators will cleave and form free radicals, which will begin a polymerization reaction that forms crosslinks between polymer strands. This reaction will cease if the light source is removed, allowing the amount of crosslinks formed in the hydrogel to be controlled. The properties of a hydrogel are highly dependent on the type and quantity of its crosslinks, making photopolymerization a popular choice for fine-tuning hydrogels. This technique has seen considerable use in cell and tissue engineering applications due to the ability to inject or mold a precursor solution loaded with cells into a wound site, then solidify it in situ.

Physically crosslinked hydrogels can be prepared by different methods depending on the nature of the crosslink involved. Polyvinyl alcohol hydrogels are usually produced by the freeze-thaw technique. In this, the solution is frozen for a few hours, then thawed at room temperature, and the cycle is repeated until a strong and stable hydrogel is formed. Alginate hydrogels are formed by ionic interactions between alginate and double-charged cations. A salt, usually calcium chloride, is dissolved into an aqueous sodium alginate solution, that causes the calcium ions to create ionic bonds between alginate chains. Gelatin hydrogels are formed by temperature change. A water solution of gelatin forms an hydrogel at temperatures below 37–35 °C, as Van der Waals interactions between collagen fibers become stronger than thermal molecular vibrations.

=== Peptide based hydrogels ===
Peptide based hydrogels possess exceptional biocompatibility and biodegradability qualities, giving rise to their wide use of applications, particularly in biomedicine; as such, their physical properties can be fine-tuned in order to maximise their use. Methods to do this are: modulation of the amino acid sequence, pH, chirality, and increasing the number of aromatic residues. The order of amino acids within the sequence is crucial for gelation, as has been shown many times. In one example, a short peptide sequence Fmoc-Phe-Gly readily formed a hydrogel, whereas Fmoc-Gly-Phe failed to do so as a result of the two adjacent aromatic moieties being moved, hindering the aromatic interactions. Altering the pH can also have similar effects, an example involved the use of the naphthalene (Nap) modified dipeptides Nap-Gly-Ala, and Nap- Ala-Gly, where a drop in pH induced gelation of the former, but led to crystallisation of the latter. A controlled pH decrease method using glucono-δ-lactone (GdL), where the GdL is hydrolysed to gluconic acid in water is a recent strategy that has been developed as a way to form homogeneous and reproducible hydrogels. The hydrolysis is slow, which allows for a uniform pH change, and thus resulting in reproducible homogenous gels. In addition to this, the desired pH can be achieved by altering the amount of GdL added. The use of GdL has been used various times for the hydrogelation of Fmoc and Nap-dipeptides. In another direction, Morris et al reported the use of GdL as a 'molecular trigger' to predict and control the order of gelation. Chirality also plays an essential role in gel formation, and even changing the chirality of a single amino acid from its natural L-amino acid to its unnatural D-amino acid can significantly impact the gelation properties, with the natural forms not forming gels. Furthermore, aromatic interactions play a key role in hydrogel formation as a result of π- π stacking driving gelation, shown by many studies.

=== Other ===
Hydrogels also possess a degree of flexibility very similar to natural tissue due to their significant water content. As responsive "smart materials", hydrogels can encapsulate chemical systems which upon stimulation by external factors such as a change of pH may cause specific compounds such as glucose to be liberated to the environment, in most cases by a gel–sol transition to the liquid state. Chemomechanical polymers are mostly also hydrogels, which upon stimulation change their volume and can serve as actuators or sensors.

A micropump based on a hydrogel bar (4×0.3×0.05 mm size) actuated by applied voltage. This pump can be continuously operated with a 1.5 V battery for at least 6 months.

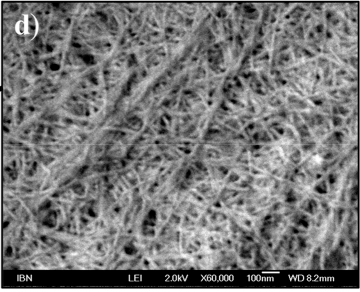
A short-peptide-based hydrogel matrix, capable of holding about one hundred times its own weight in water. Developed as a medical dressing.

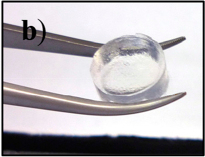
Photo of the same short-peptide-based hydrogel, held in forceps to demonstrate its stiffness and transparency.

== Mechanical properties ==
Hydrogels have been investigated for diverse applications. By modifying the polymer concentration of a hydrogel (or conversely, the water concentration), the Young's modulus, shear modulus, and storage modulus can vary from 10 Pa to 3 MPa, a range of about five orders of magnitude. A similar effect can be seen by altering the crosslinking concentration. This much variability of the mechanical stiffness is why hydrogels are so appealing for biomedical applications, where it is vital for implants to match the mechanical properties of the surrounding tissues. Characterizing the mechanical properties of hydrogels can be difficult especially due to the differences in mechanical behavior that hydrogels have in comparison to other traditional engineering materials. In addition to its rubber elasticity and viscoelasticity, hydrogels have an additional time dependent deformation mechanism which is dependent on fluid flow called poroelasticity. These properties are extremely important to consider while performing mechanical experiments. Some common mechanical testing experiments for hydrogels are tension, compression (confined or unconfined), indentation, shear rheometry or dynamic mechanical analysis.

Hydrogels have two main regimes of mechanical properties: rubber elasticity and viscoelasticity:

=== Rubber elasticity ===
In the unswollen state, hydrogels can be modelled as highly crosslinked chemical gels, in which the system can be described as one continuous polymer network. In this case:

$G=N_{p}kT={\rho RT \over \overline{M}_{c}}$

where G is the shear modulus, k is the Boltzmann constant, T is temperature, N_{p} is the number of polymer chains per unit volume, ρ is the density, R is the ideal gas constant, and $\overline{M}_{c}$ is the (number) average molecular weight between two adjacent cross-linking points. $\overline{M}_{c}$ can be calculated from the swell ratio, Q, which is relatively easy to test and measure.

For the swollen state, a perfect gel network can be modeled as:

$G_{\textrm{swollen}}=GQ^{-1/3}$

In a simple uniaxial extension or compression test, the true stress, $\sigma _{t}$, and engineering stress, $\sigma _{e}$, can be calculated as:

$\sigma _{t}=G_{\textrm{swollen}}\left ( \lambda ^{2}-\lambda ^{-1} \right )$

$\sigma _{e}=G_{\textrm{swollen}}\left ( \lambda -\lambda ^{-2} \right )$

where $\lambda =l_{\textrm{current}}/l_{\textrm{original}}$ is the stretch.

=== Viscoelasticity ===
For hydrogels, their elasticity comes from the solid polymer matrix while the viscosity originates from the polymer network mobility and the water and other components that make up the aqueous phase. Viscoelastic properties of a hydrogel is highly dependent on the nature of the applied mechanical motion. Thus, the time dependence of these applied forces is extremely important for evaluating the viscoelasticity of the material.

Physical models for viscoelasticity attempt to capture the elastic and viscous material properties of a material. In an elastic material, the stress is proportional to the strain while in a viscous material, the stress is proportional to the strain rate. The Maxwell model is one developed mathematical model for linear viscoelastic response. In this model, viscoelasticity is modeled analogous to an electrical circuit with a Hookean spring, that represents the Young's modulus, and a Newtonian dashpot that represents the viscosity. A material that exhibit properties described in this model is a Maxwell material. Another physical model used is called the Kelvin-Voigt Model and a material that follow this model is called a Kelvin–Voigt material. In order to describe the time-dependent creep and stress-relaxation behavior of hydrogel, a variety of physical lumped parameter models can be used. These modeling methods vary greatly and are extremely complex, so the empirical Prony Series description is commonly used to describe the viscoelastic behavior in hydrogels.

In order to measure the time-dependent viscoelastic behavior of polymers dynamic mechanical analysis is often performed. Typically, in these measurements the one side of the hydrogel is subjected to a sinusoidal load in shear mode while the applied stress is measured with a stress transducer and the change in sample length is measured with a strain transducer. One notation used to model the sinusoidal response to the periodic stress or strain is:

$$G = G' + iG''$$

in which G' is the real (elastic or storage) modulus, G" is the imaginary (viscous or loss) modulus.

=== Poroelasticity ===
Poroelasticity is a characteristic of materials related to the migration of solvent through a porous material and the concurrent deformation that occurs. Poroelasticity in hydrated materials such as hydrogels occurs due to friction between the polymer and water as the water moves through the porous matrix upon compression. This causes a decrease in water pressure, which adds additional stress upon compression. Similar to viscoelasticity, this behavior is time dependent, thus poroelasticity is dependent on compression rate: a hydrogel shows softness upon slow compression, but fast compression makes the hydrogel stiffer. This phenomenon is due to the friction between the water and the porous matrix is proportional to the flow of water, which in turn is dependent on compression rate. Thus, a common way to measure poroelasticity is to do compression tests at varying compression rates. Pore size is an important factor in influencing poroelasticity. The Kozeny–Carman equation has been used to predict pore size by relating the pressure drop to the difference in stress between two compression rates.

Poroelasticity is described by several coupled equations, thus there are few mechanical tests that relate directly to the poroelastic behavior of the material, thus more complicated tests such as indentation testing, numerical or computational models are utilized. Numerical or computational methods attempt to simulate the three dimensional permeability of the hydrogel network.

=== Toughness and hysteresis ===
The toughness of a hydrogel refers to the ability of the hydrogel to withstand deformation or mechanical stress without fracturing or breaking apart. A hydrogel with high toughness can maintain its structural integrity and functionality under higher stress. Several factors contribute to the toughness of a hydrogel including composition, crosslink density, polymer chain structure, and hydration level. The toughness of a hydrogel is highly dependent on what polymer(s) and crosslinker(s) make up its matrix as certain polymers possess higher toughness and certain crosslinking covalent bonds are inherently stronger. Additionally, higher crosslinking density generally leads to increased toughness by restricting polymer chain mobility and enhancing resistance to deformation. The structure of the polymer chains is also a factor in that, longer chain lengths and higher molecular weight leads to a greater number of entanglements and higher toughness. A good balance (equilibrium) in the hydration of a hydrogel leads is important because too low hydration causes poor flexibility and toughness within the hydrogel, but too high of water content can cause excessive swelling, weakening the mechanical properties of the hydrogel.

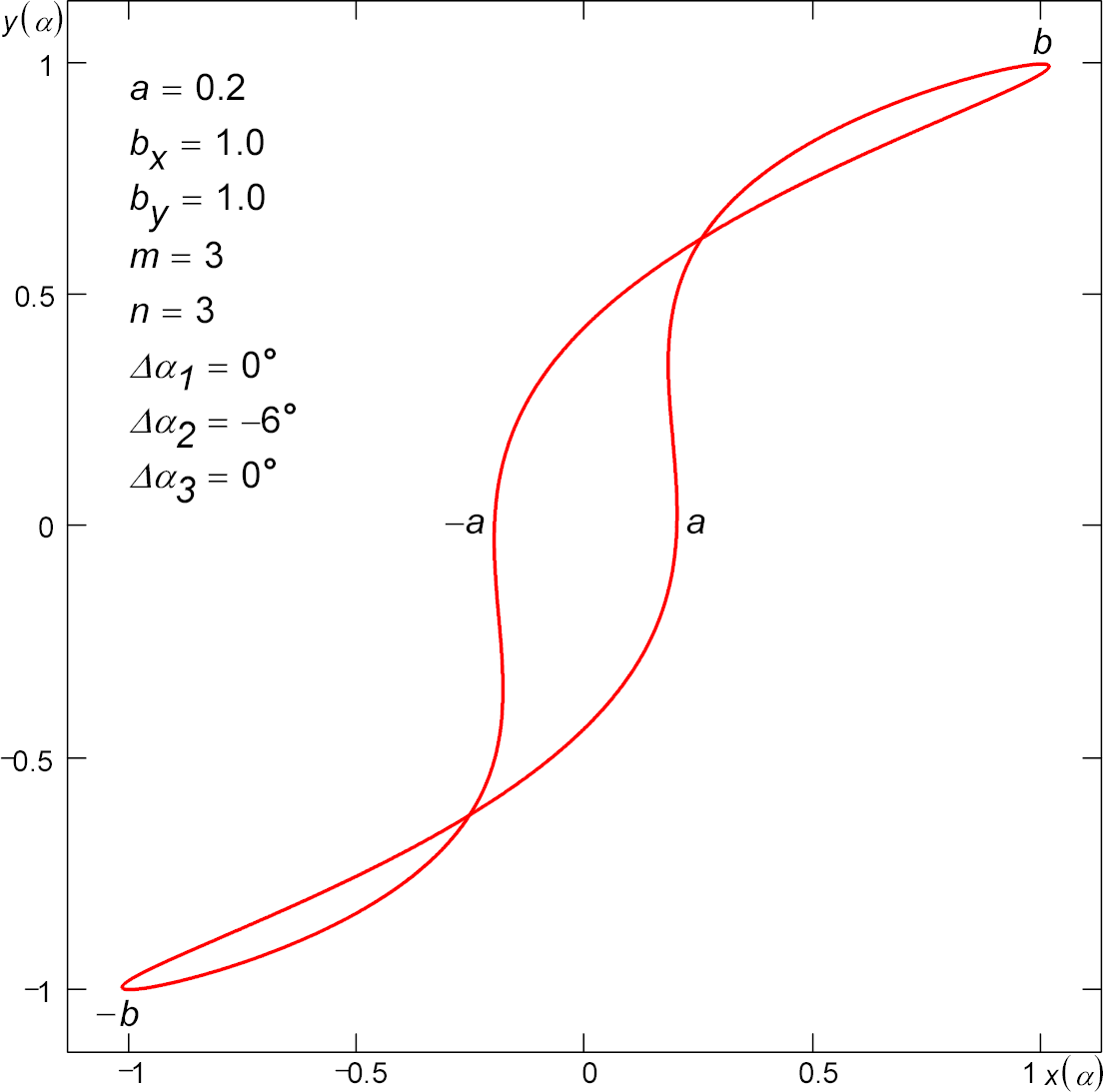
Model of Hysteresis Loop

The hysteresis of a hydrogel refers to the phenomenon where there is a delay in the deformation and recovery of a hydrogel when it is subjected to mechanical stress and relieved of that stress. This occurs because the polymer chains within a hydrogel rearrange, and the water molecules are displaced, and energy is stored as it deforms in mechanical extension or compression. When the mechanical stress is removed, the hydrogel begins to recover its original shape, but there may be a delay in the recovery process due to factors like viscoelasticity, internal friction, etc. This leads to a difference between the stress-strain curve during loading and unloading. Hysteresis within a hydrogel is influenced by several factors including composition, crosslink density, polymer chain structure, and temperature.

The toughness and hysteresis of a hydrogel are especially important in the context of biomedical applications such as tissue engineering and drug delivery, as the hydrogel may need to withstand mechanical forces within the body, but also maintain mechanical performance and stability over time. Most typical hydrogels, both natural and synthetic, have a positive correlation between toughness and hysteresis, meaning that the higher the toughness, the longer the hydrogel takes to recover its original shape and vice versa. This is largely due to sacrificial bonds being the source of toughness within many of these hydrogels. Sacrificial bonds are non-covalent interactions such as hydrogen bonds, ionic interactions, and hydrophobic interactions, that can break and reform under mechanical stress. The reforming of these bonds takes time, especially when there are more of them, which leads to an increase in hysteresis. However, there is currently research focused on the development of highly entangled hydrogels, which instead rely on the long chain length of the polymers and their entanglement to limit the deformation of the hydrogel, thereby increasing the toughness without increasing hysteresis as there is no need for the reformation of the bonds.

=== Environmental response ===
The most commonly seen environmental sensitivity in hydrogels is a response to temperature. Many polymers/hydrogels exhibit a temperature dependent phase transition, which can be classified as either an upper critical solution temperature (UCST) or lower critical solution temperature (LCST). UCST polymers increase in their water-solubility at higher temperatures, which lead to UCST hydrogels transitioning from a gel (solid) to a solution (liquid) as the temperature is increased (similar to the melting point behavior of pure materials). This phenomenon also causes UCST hydrogels to expand (increase their swell ratio) as temperature increases while they are below their UCST. However, polymers with LCSTs display an inverse (or negative) temperature-dependence, where their water-solubility decreases at higher temperatures. LCST hydrogels transition from a liquid solution to a solid gel as the temperature is increased, and they also shrink (decrease their swell ratio) as the temperature increases while they are above their LCST.

Applications can dictate for diverse thermal responses. For example, in the biomedical field, LCST hydrogels are being investigated as drug delivery systems due to being injectable (liquid) at room temp and then solidifying into a rigid gel upon exposure to the higher temperatures of the human body. There are many other stimuli that hydrogels can be responsive to, including: pH, glucose, electrical signals, light, pressure, ions, antigens, and more.

=== Additives ===
The mechanical properties of hydrogels can be fine-tuned in many ways beginning with attention to their hydrophobic properties. Another method of modifying the strength or elasticity of hydrogels is to graft or surface coat them onto a stronger/stiffer support, or by making superporous hydrogel (SPH) composites, in which a cross-linkable matrix swelling additive is added. Other additives, such as nanoparticles and microparticles, have been shown to significantly modify the stiffness and gelation temperature of certain hydrogels used in biomedical applications.

=== Processing techniques ===
While a hydrogel's mechanical properties can be tuned and modified through crosslink concentration and additives, these properties can also be enhanced or optimized for various applications through specific processing techniques. These techniques include electro-spinning, 3D/4D printing, self-assembly, and freeze-casting. One unique processing technique is through the formation of multi-layered hydrogels to create a spatially-varying matrix composition and by extension, mechanical properties. This can be done by polymerizing the hydrogel matrixes in a layer by layer fashion via UV polymerization. This technique can be useful in creating hydrogels that mimic articular cartilage, enabling a material with three separate zones of distinct mechanical properties.

Another emerging technique to optimize hydrogel mechanical properties is by taking advantage of the Hofmeister series. Due to this phenomenon, through the addition of salt solution, the polymer chains of a hydrogel aggregate and crystallize, which increases the toughness of the hydrogel. This method, called "salting out", has been applied to poly(vinyl alcohol) hydrogels by adding a sodium sulfate salt solution. Some of these processing techniques can be used synergistically with each other to yield optimal mechanical properties. Directional freezing or freeze-casting is another method in which a directional temperature gradient is applied to the hydrogel is another way to form materials with anisotropic mechanical properties. Utilizing both the freeze-casting and salting-out processing techniques on poly(vinyl alcohol) hydrogels to induce hierarchical morphologies and anisotropic mechanical properties. Directional freezing of the hydrogels helps to align and coalesce the polymer chains, creating anisotropic array honeycomb tube-like structures while salting out the hydrogel yielded out a nano-fibril network on the surface of these honeycomb tube-like structures. While maintaining a water content of over 70%, these hydrogels' toughness values are well above those of water-free polymers such as polydimethylsiloxane (PDMS), Kevlar, and synthetic rubber. The values also surpass the toughness of natural tendon and spider silk.

=== Yield Stress Measurement in Hydrogels ===
The yield stress of a hydrogel can be measured using the collapse test, a method commonly applied to materials suitable for 3D printing. In this test, a filament of hydrogel is printed on top of a series of plastic blocks with progressively increasing gaps between them. A side-view image of the filament is then taken, showing the angle the hydrogel filament forms with the vertical axis. This collapse angle provides a measurable indicator of the material's yield stress.

Ribeiro et al. (2017) established a set of equations to relate the collapse angle to the hydrogel's yield stress, providing a quantitative framework for assessing bioink shape fidelity in 3D bioprinting. These equations were later generalised in 2024 to account for non-symmetrical geometries and large deformations in hydrogels tested under similar collapse conditions.

== Applications ==
=== Biomaterials ===
Hydrogels are three-dimensional network structures with high hydrophilicity that can absorb and retain large amounts of water. Due to their excellent biocompatibility, they are widely used in the field of biomaterials. The main feature of hydrogels is their high water content, which is similar to the aqueous environment in biological systems, making them ideal for applications in tissue engineering, drug delivery, wound dressings, and artificial skin. Hydrogels can be classified into natural and synthetic types. Natural hydrogels, such as gelatin and chitosan, are derived from biological materials and offer good biodegradability and biocompatibility. Synthetic hydrogels, on the other hand, typically have higher mechanical strength and tunability but may exhibit lower biocompatibility. Additionally, hydrogels can be categorized as environmental-responsive or non-responsive based on their response to external stimuli. Environmental-responsive hydrogels, which can react to changes in temperature, pH, or ion concentration, are particularly useful in drug delivery systems. Due to their tunability, hydrogels continue to expand their applications in the biomedical field and are expected to play a crucial role in various medical applications in the future. Natural adhesive hydrogels made from polymers like chitosan can help stop severe bleeding by rapidly absorbing fluid from blood and concentrating platelets at the wound site. By bonding directly to wet tissue, these gel dressings seal injuries and stop bleeding faster than standard medical gauze.

Implanted or injected hydrogels have the potential to support tissue regeneration by mechanical tissue support, localized drug or cell delivery, local cell recruitement or immunomodulation, or encapsulation of nanoparticles for local photothermal therapy or brachytherapy. Polymeric drug delivery systems have overcome challenges due to their biodegradability, biocompatibility, and anti-toxicity. Materials such as collagen, chitosan, cellulose, and poly (lactic-co-glycolic acid) have been implemented extensively for drug delivery to organs such as eye, nose, kidneys, lungs, intestines, skin and brain. Future work is focused on reducing toxicity, improving biocompatibility, expanding assembly techniques

Hydrogels have been considered as vehicles for drug delivery. They can also be made to mimic animal mucosal tissues to be used for testing mucoadhesive properties. They have been examined for use as reservoirs in topical drug delivery; particularly ionic drugs, delivered by iontophoresis.

Hydrogel-based biomimetic physical barriers can separates T cells from tumors, potentially allowing them to regain strength before resuming immunotherapy.

=== Soft contact lenses ===
Molecular structure of silicone hydrogel used in flexible, oxygen-permeable contact lenses.

The dominant material for contact lenses are acrylate-siloxane hydrogels. They have replaced hard contact lenses. One of their most attractive properties is oxygen permeability, which is required since the cornea lacks vasculature.

=== Research ===
Human mesenchymal stem cell interacting with 3D hydrogel - imaged with label-free live cell imaging

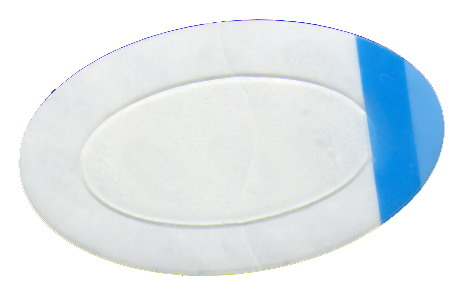
An adhesive bandage with a hydrogel pad, used for blisters and burns. The central gel is clear, the adhesive waterproof plastic film is clear, the backing is white and blue.

- Scalephobicity and antifouling
- Coatings for gas evolution reaction electrodes for efficient bubble detachment
- Breast implants
- Contact lenses (silicone hydrogels, polyacrylamides, polymacon)
- Water sustainability: Hydrogels have emerged as promising materials platforms for solar-powered water purification, water disinfection, and atmospheric water generator.
- Disposable diapers where they absorb urine, or in sanitary napkins
- Dressings for healing of burn or other hard-to-heal wounds. Wound gels are excellent for helping to create or maintain a moist environment.
- EEG and ECG medical electrodes using hydrogels composed of cross-linked polymers (polyethylene oxide, polyAMPS and polyvinylpyrrolidone)
- Encapsulation of quantum dots
- Environmentally sensitive hydrogels (also known as 'smart gels' or 'intelligent gels'). These hydrogels have the ability to sense changes of pH, temperature, or the concentration of metabolite and release their load as result of such a change.
- Fibers
- Glue
- Granules for holding soil moisture in arid areas
- Air bubble-repellent (superaerophobicity). Can improve the performance and stability of electrodes for water electrolysis.
- Culturing cells: Hydrogel-coated wells have been used for cell culture.
- Biosensors: Hydrogels that are responsive to specific molecules, such as glucose or antigens, can be used as biosensors, as well as in DDS.
- Cell carrier: Injectable hydrogels can be used to carry drugs or cells for applications in tissue regeneration or 3D bioprinting. Hydrogels with reversible chemistry are required to allow for fluidization during injection/printing followed by self-healing of the original hydrogel structure.
- Investigate cell biomechanical functions combined with holotomography microscopy
- Provide absorption, desloughing and debriding of necrotic and fibrotic tissue
- Tissue engineering scaffolds. When used as scaffolds, hydrogels may contain human cells to repair tissue. They mimic 3D microenvironment of cells. Materials include agarose, methylcellulose, hyaluronan, elastin-like polypeptides, and other naturally derived polymers.
- Sustained-release drug delivery systems. Ionic strength, pH and temperature can be used as a triggering factor to control the release of the drug.
  - Light-stimulated drug release systems. Using light as an exogenous stimulus, temporal control also opens possibilities for on-off switchable release of molecular cargoes through hydrogel-polymersome composites.
- The swelling behavior exhibited by charged hydrogels can be used as a valuable tool for investigating interactions between charged polymers and various species, including multivalent ions, peptides, and proteins. This response arises due to fluctuating osmotic swelling forces resulting from the exchange of counterions within the gel matrix. Particularly significant is its application in assessing the binding of peptide drugs to biopolymers within the body, as the swelling response of the gel can provide insights into these interactions.
- Window coating/replacement: Hydrogels are under consideration for reducing infrared light absorption by 75%. Another approach reduced interior temperature using a temperature-responsive hydrogel.
- Thermodynamic electricity generation: When combined with ions allows for heat dissipation for electronic devices and batteries and converting the heat exchange to an electrical charge.
- Water gel explosives
- Controlled release of agrochemicals (pesticides and fertilizer)
- Talin shock absorbing materials - protein-based hydrogels that can absorb supersonic impacts
- Computational tasks, including emergent memory.
