= Vinylation =

In organic chemistry, vinylation is the process of attaching a vinyl group (CH_{2}=CH−) to a substrate. Many organic compounds contain vinyl groups, so the process has attracted significant interest, especially since the reaction scope includes substituted vinyl groups. The reactions can be classified according to the source of the vinyl group.

== Nucleophilic vinyl reagents ==
Vinyl lithium and vinyl magnesium bromide are sources of "CH_{2}=CH^{−}", which add to ketones and aldehydes.

Vinylsiloxane and vinylboranes have also been used as sources of vinyl anion equivalents.These types of reactions require catalysts such as those based on palladium.

== Vinylation with alkenes ==
The Heck reaction couples an unsaturated halide with an alkene. Base and a palladium catalyst are required. This reaction is a way to substitute alkenes.

The Heck reaction in the production of Naproxen.

== Vinylation with acetylene ==
As originally developed by Walter Reppe, acetylene participates in a variety of metal- or base-catalyzed reaction to afford vinyl derivatives. Alcohols, thiols, and secondary amines add to acetylene to give the vinyl ethers, vinyl sulfides, and vinyl amines, respectively.

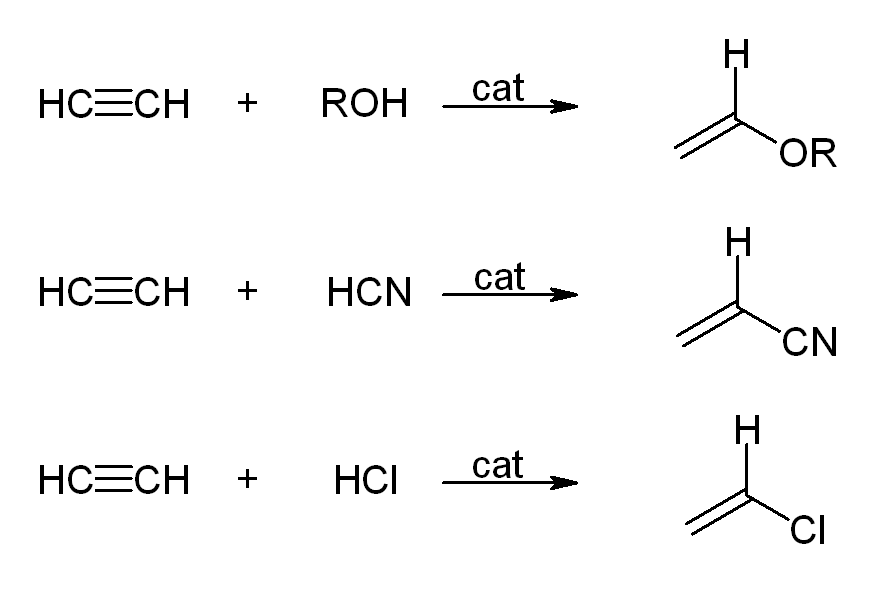

In the presence of metal catalysts, carbon monoxide and acetylene react to give acrylic acid or acrylic esters. The net reaction is vinylation of carbon monoxide.

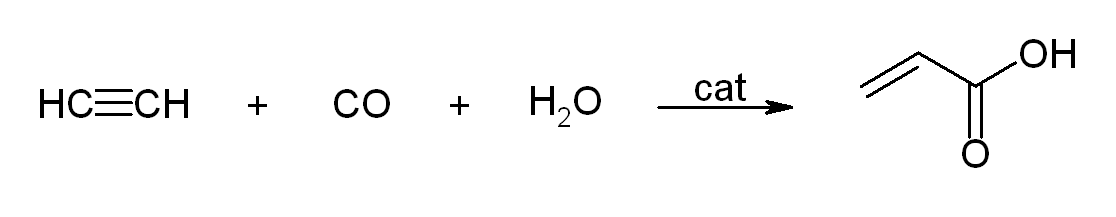
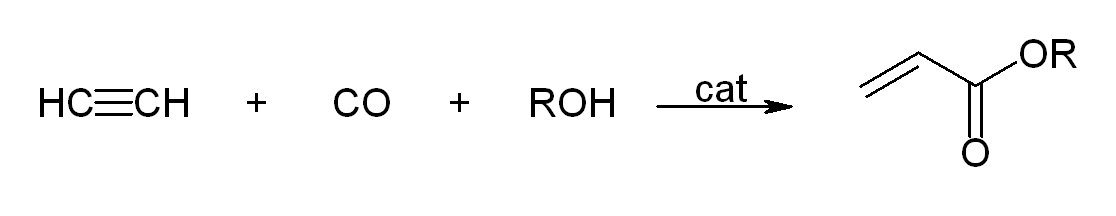

== Vinyl acetate ==
Preparing vinyl esters typically requires indirect methods because vinyl alcohol is not a suitable reagent. Vinyl acetate, which is available on an industrial scale, can be used to produce other vinyl esters. The process is sometimes referred to as transvinylation. Higher esters of vinyl acetate have been used in the synthesis of vinyl formate.

Alternatively, vinyl ethers can be prepared from alcohols by iridium-catalyzed transesterification of vinyl esters, especially the widely available vinyl acetate:

ROH + CH_{2}=CHOAc → ROCH=CH_{2} + HOAc

== See also ==
- Hydrovinylation, ethylene adds "across" an alkene double bond
