= Castor oil glycidyl ether =

Names
- IUPAC name 2,3-bis[12-(oxiran-2-ylmethoxy)octadec-9-enoyloxy]propyl 12-(oxiran-2-ylmethoxy)octadec-9-enoate

Identifiers
CAS Number	74398-71-3
3D model (JSmol)	Interactive image
EC Number	616-085-8
PubChem CID	58604493
- InChI: InChI=1S/C66H116O12/c1-4-7-10-31-40-57(70-49-60-52-73-60)43-34-25-19-13-16-22-28-37-46-64(67)76-55-63(78-66(69)48-39-30-24-18-15-21-27-36-45-59(42-33-12-9-6-3)72-51-62-54-75-62)56-77-65(68)47-38-29-23-17-14-20-26-35-44-58(41-32-11-8-5-2)71-50-61-53-74-61/h25-27,34-36,57-63H,4-24,28-33,37-56H2,1-3H3 Key: ZFJYZDDXGKWNCH-UHFFFAOYSA-N
- SMILES: CCCCCCC(CC=CCCCCCCCC(=O)OCC(COC(=O)CCCCCCCC=CCC(CCCCCC)OCC1CO1)OC(=O)CCCCCCCC=CCC(CCCCCC)OCC2CO2)OCC3CO3

Properties
Chemical formula	C_{66}H_{116}O_{12}
Molar mass	1101.6 g/mol

Hazards
- GHS labelling
Pictograms	(GHS07: Exclamation mark)
Signal word	Warning
Hazard statements	H315, H317
Precautionary statements	P261, P264, P264+P265, P271, P272, P280, P302+P352, P304+P340, P305+P351+P338, P319, P321, P332+P317, P333+P313, P337+P317, P362+P364, P403+P233, P405, P501
- Except where otherwise noted, data are given for materials in their standard state (at 25 °C [77 °F], 100 kPa). Infobox references

Castor oil glycidyl ether is a liquid organic chemical in the glycidyl ether family. It is sometimes called castor oil triglycidyl ether. It has the theoretical formula C_{66}H_{116}O_{12}. There are two CAS numbers in use, 14228-73-0 and 74398-71-3. The IUPAC name is 2,3-bis[[(E)-12-(oxiran-2-ylmethoxy)octadec-9-enoyl]oxy]propyl (E)-12-(oxiran-2-ylmethoxy)octadec-9-enoate. A key use is acting as a modifier for epoxy resins as a reactive diluent that adds flexibility and improved mechanical properties.

== Manufacture ==
It is made by glycidation of castor oil which is a vegetable oil. Castor oil and epichlorohydrin are reacted in the presence of a Lewis acid catalyst to form halohydrin: each hydroxyl group of the triol reacts with an epoxide on epichlorohydrin. This process is followed neutralizing the catalyst with a small amount of sodium hydroxide and then adding a large excess of epichlorohydrin as solvent. To re-form the epoxide rings in a dehydrochlorination reaction, solid sodium hydroxide flake is used rather than a solution. On completion the epichlorohydrin is recovered and the product cleaned up. One of the quality control tests would involve measuring the epoxy value by determination of the epoxy equivalent weight.

== Uses ==
A 2018 study concluded that its use as a flexiblizing agent as well as an epoxy diluent has application in the aviation field. Poly(propylene glycol) diglycidyl ether may also be used for the same application but has the perceived disadvantage that it is petroleum based rather than renewable plant based like the castor oil glycidyl ether. A patent application shows it may also be used as a co-reactant-surfactant in herbicide production. As the molecule has 3 oxirane functionalities, a key use is modifying and reducing the viscosity of epoxy resins. These reactive diluent modified epoxy resins may then be further formulated into CASE applications: coatings, adhesives, sealants, elastomers. It is also used in composite production. It produces epoxy coatings with high impact resistance. Polymer systems with shape memory may also be produced with this particular molecule. The use of the diluent does effect mechanical properties and microstructure of epoxy resins. Production of biocompatible materials is also possible and the material is often classed as a renewable resource. It has also found use in oil well petroleum recovery.

== See also ==
- Epoxide
- Glycidol

== External websites ==
- Castor Oil Triglycidyl Ether Technical Data Sheet
- Hexion Website Heloxy modifier 505
- PE-412 Castor Oil Glycidyl ether (aalchem.com)
- Safety Data Sheet
- Current Intelligence Bulletin 29: Glycidyl Ethers (79-104) | NIOSH | CDC
