= Trimethylolethane triglycidyl ether =

Names
- IUPAC name 2-({2-Methyl-3-(2-oxiranylmethoxy)-2-[(2-oxiranylmethoxy)methyl]propoxy}methyl)oxirane

Identifiers
CAS Number	36366-26-4
3D model (JSmol)	Interactive image
ChemSpider	2666788
ECHA InfoCard	100.214.877
CompTox Dashboard (EPA)	DTXSID50889403
- InChI: InChI=1S/C14H24O6/c1-14(8-15-2-11-5-18-11,9-16-3-12-6-19-12)10-17-4-13-7-20-13/h11-13H,2-10H2,1H3 Key: YIEBXCCPOCRXRB-UHFFFAOYSA-N
- SMILES: CC(COCC1CO1)(COCC2CO2)COCC3CO3

Properties
Chemical formula	C_{14}H_{24}O_{6}
Molar mass	288.340 g·mol^{−1}
- Except where otherwise noted, data are given for materials in their standard state (at 25 °C [77 °F], 100 kPa). Infobox references

Trimethylolethane triglycidyl ether (TMETGE) is an organic chemical in the glycidyl ether family. It has the formula C_{14}H_{24}O_{6} and the IUPAC name is 2-({2-methyl-3-[(oxiran-2-yl)methoxy]-2-{[(oxiran-2-yl)methoxy]methyl}propoxy}methyl)oxirane. The CAS number is 68460-21-9. A key use is as a modifier for epoxy resins as a reactive diluent.

== Alternative names ==
- Trimethylolethane,chloromethyloxirane polymer
- Trimethylolethane triglycidyl ether
- 1,3-Propanediol,2-(hydroxymethyl)-2-methyl-,polymer with (chloromethyl)oxirane
- 1,3-Propanediol,2-(hydroxymethyl)-2-methyl-,polymer with 2-(chloromethyl)oxirane
- 2-(hydroxymethyl)-2-methylpropane-1,3-diol-2-(chloromethyl)oxirane (1:1)

== Manufacture ==
Trimethylolethane and epichlorohydrin are reacted with a Lewis acid catalyst to form a halohydrin. The next step is dehydrochlorination with sodium hydroxide. This forms the triglycidyl ether. Waste products are sodium chloride, water and excess sodium hydroxide (alkaline brine).

== Uses ==
As the molecule has 3 oxirane functionalities, a key use is modifying and reducing the viscosity of epoxy resins but giving higher functionality. These reactive diluent modified epoxy resins may then be further formulated into CASE applications: Coatings, Adhesives, Sealants, and Elastomers. The use of the diluent does effect mechanical properties and microstructure of epoxy resins. It produces epoxy coatings with high impact resistance The molecule has been used to synthesize other molecules.

== See also ==
- Epoxide
- Glycidol

== External websites ==
- Hexion Poly-functional Modifiers
- Denacol epoxy diluent range
- Cargill Reactive diluents
- GE31_Technical Data Sheet
