= C10H18O5 =

The molecular formula C_{10}H_{18}O_{5} (molar mass: 218.249 g/mol) may refer to:

- Di-tert-butyl dicarbonate
- Diethylene glycol diglycidyl ether
