= Polypropylene glycol =

Names
- Other names Propylene oxide homopolymer Poly (propene oxide)

Identifiers
| CAS Number | 25322-69-4; 106-62-7 |
| ECHA InfoCard | 100.105.547 |
| UNII | 01SEY4236K |
| CompTox Dashboard (EPA) | DTXSID9027863 |

Properties
| Chemical formula | C_{3n}H_{6n+2}O_{n+1} |
| Molar mass | 58.08n + 18.08 (repeat unit), mass of polymer variable |
- Except where otherwise noted, data are given for materials in their standard state (at 25 °C [77 °F], 100 kPa). Infobox references

Polypropylene glycol or polypropylene oxide is the polymer (or macromolecule) of propylene glycol. Chemically it is a polyether, and, more generally speaking, it's a polyalkylene glycol (PAG) H S Code 3907.2000. The term polypropylene glycol or PPG is reserved for polymer of low- to medium-range molar mass when the nature of the end-group, which is usually a hydroxyl group, still matters. The term "oxide" is used for high-molar-mass polymer when end-groups no longer affect polymer properties. Between 60 and 70% of propylene oxide is converted to polyether polyols by the process called alkoxylation.

== Polymerization ==
Polypropylene glycol is produced by ring-opening polymerization of propylene oxide. The initiator is an alcohol and the catalyst a base, usually potassium hydroxide. When the initiator is ethylene glycol or water the polymer is linear. With a multifunctional initiator like glycerine, pentaerythritol or sorbitol the polymer branches out.

Polypropylene glycol

Conventional polymerization of propylene oxide results in an atactic polymer. The isotactic polymer can be produced from optically active propylene oxide, but at a high cost. A salen cobalt catalyst was reported in 2005 to provide isotactic polymerization of the prochiral propylene oxide

== Properties ==
PPG has many properties in common with polyethylene glycol. The polymer is a liquid at room temperature. Solubility in water decreases rapidly with increasing molar mass. Secondary hydroxyl groups in PPG are less reactive than primary hydroxyl groups in polyethylene glycol. PPG is less toxic than PEG, so biotechnologicals are now mainly produced with PPG.

Cobalt catalyst for isotactic polypropylene oxide

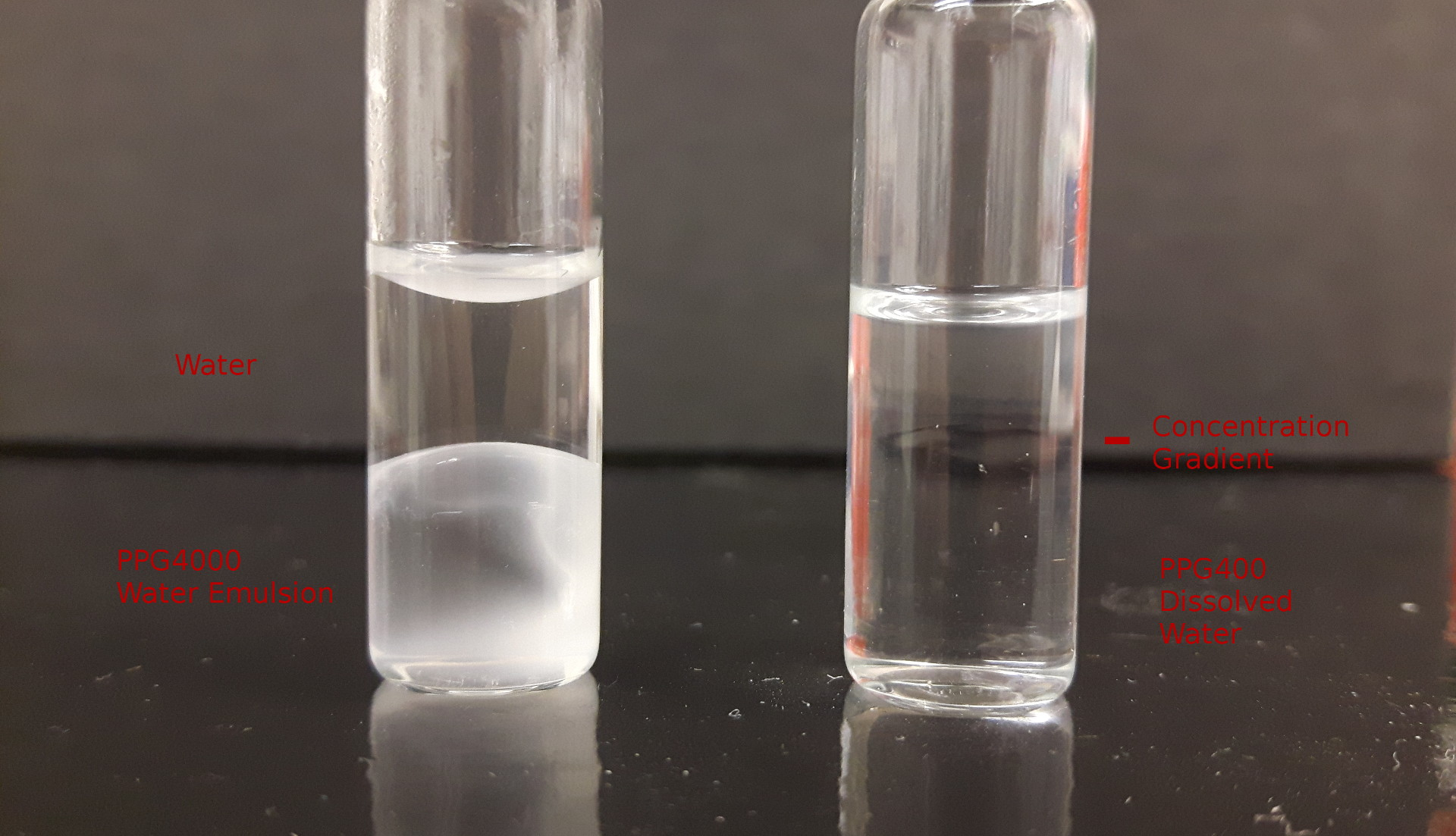
Difference in water solubility of PPG4000 and PPG400

== Uses ==
PPG is used in many polyurethane formulations. Synthesis of waterborne polymers has been a feature with this substance. As the basic building block is propylene oxide, there are 3 carbons per oxygen on the backbone. This confers some degree of water miscibility though not as good as ethylene oxide-based molecules. It is used to synthesize the epoxy reactive diluent and flexibilizer, Poly(propylene glycol) diglycidyl ether. Another use of PPG is as a surfactant, wetting agent and dispersant in leather finishing. PPG is also employed as a reference and calibrant in mass spectrometry and HPLC. PPG and derivatives may be used as defoamers in drilling and other applications. It is also used as a primary ingredient in the making of paintballs. It has been evaluated as a corrosion inhibitor.

== External websites ==
- Polypropylene Glycol (PPG) | Monument Chemical
- POLYPROPYLENE GLYCOL | CAMEO Chemicals | NOAA
- Poly(propylene glycol) (polymerdatabase.com)
- Polypropylene Glycol Safety Data Sheet
