= Glycidic acid =

Names
- Preferred IUPAC name Oxiranecarboxylic acid

Identifiers
CAS Number	503-11-7
3D model (JSmol)	Interactive image
ChemSpider	84975
ECHA InfoCard	100.007.238
PubChem CID	94158
UNII	KF67YQ22DH
CompTox Dashboard (EPA)	DTXSID70964569
- InChI: InChI=1S/C3H4O3/c4-3(5)2-1-6-2/h2H,1H2,(H,4,5) Key: OTGHWLKHGCENJV-UHFFFAOYSA-N; InChI=1/C3H4O3/c4-3(5)2-1-6-2/h2H,1H2,(H,4,5) Key: OTGHWLKHGCENJV-UHFFFAOYAU
- SMILES: C1C(O1)C(=O)O

Properties
Chemical formula	C_{3}H_{4}O_{3}
Molar mass	88.062 g·mol^{−1}
- Except where otherwise noted, data are given for materials in their standard state (at 25 °C [77 °F], 100 kPa). Infobox references

Glycidic acid is an organic compound that has both epoxide and carboxylic acid functions. It may be prepared by the oxidation of glycidol, or by the epoxidation of acrylic acid. This compound is commercially available as well.

== See also ==
- Glycidamide
