= Sustainable flooring =

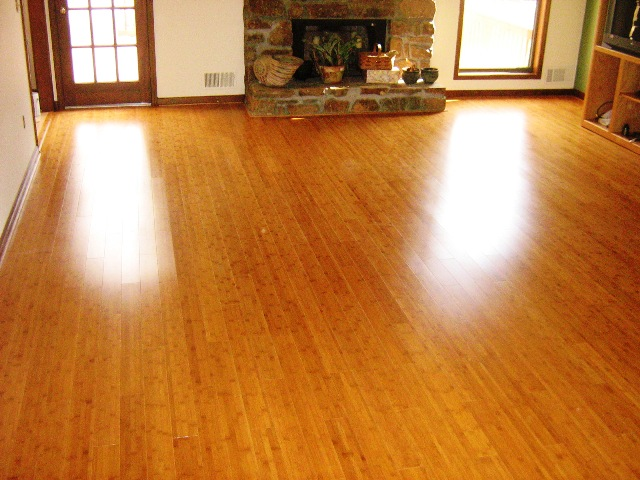
Bamboo flooring

Sustainable flooring is produced from sustainable materials (and by a sustainable process) that reduces demands on ecosystems during its life-cycle. This includes harvest, production, use and disposal. It is thought that sustainable flooring creates safer and healthier buildings and guarantees a future for traditional producers of renewable resources that many communities depend on. Several initiatives have led the charge to bring awareness of sustainable flooring as well as healthy buildings (air quality). Below are examples of available, though sometimes less well-known, eco-friendly flooring options. The Asthma and Allergy Foundation of America recommends those with allergies to dust or other particulates choose flooring with smooth surfaces – such as hardwood, vinyl, linoleum tile or slate.

In the U.S., the Building for Energy and Environmental Sustainability (BEES) program of the National Institute of Standards and Technology (NIST) provides a one-stop source of life cycle assessment-based information about flooring options. Life cycle comparisons of flooring alternatives by research groups around the world consistently show bio-based flooring products to have lower environmental impacts than other types of flooring. The life cycle environmental impacts associated with producing and using flooring alternatives such as cork, linoleum, and solid wood are clearly lower than other alternatives. Wool carpeting and composite marble exhibit the greatest impacts, and impacts linked to typical carpeting used in residential structures are higher than those shown in the BEES system due to the use of a pad under the carpet layer.

== Wood ==
The development of life cycle assessment methodology in the early 1990s has shown the environmental advantages of wood and wood-based products.

Wood is a unique and renewable material. Trees absorb carbon during their growing cycle, and this carbon remains stored in products like wood flooring during its service life, thus keeping it out of the atmosphere. At the end of its service life, wood can be reused (in which case the carbon continues to be stored in the wood) or used for fuel.

A life cycle assessment of flooring materials made of solid wood, linoleum and vinyl found the wood flooring had lower energy use and carbon dioxide emissions. It also performed better in environmental impact categories such as resource use, environmental toxin emissions, air pollution emissions and waste generation.

=== Reclaimed Wood ===
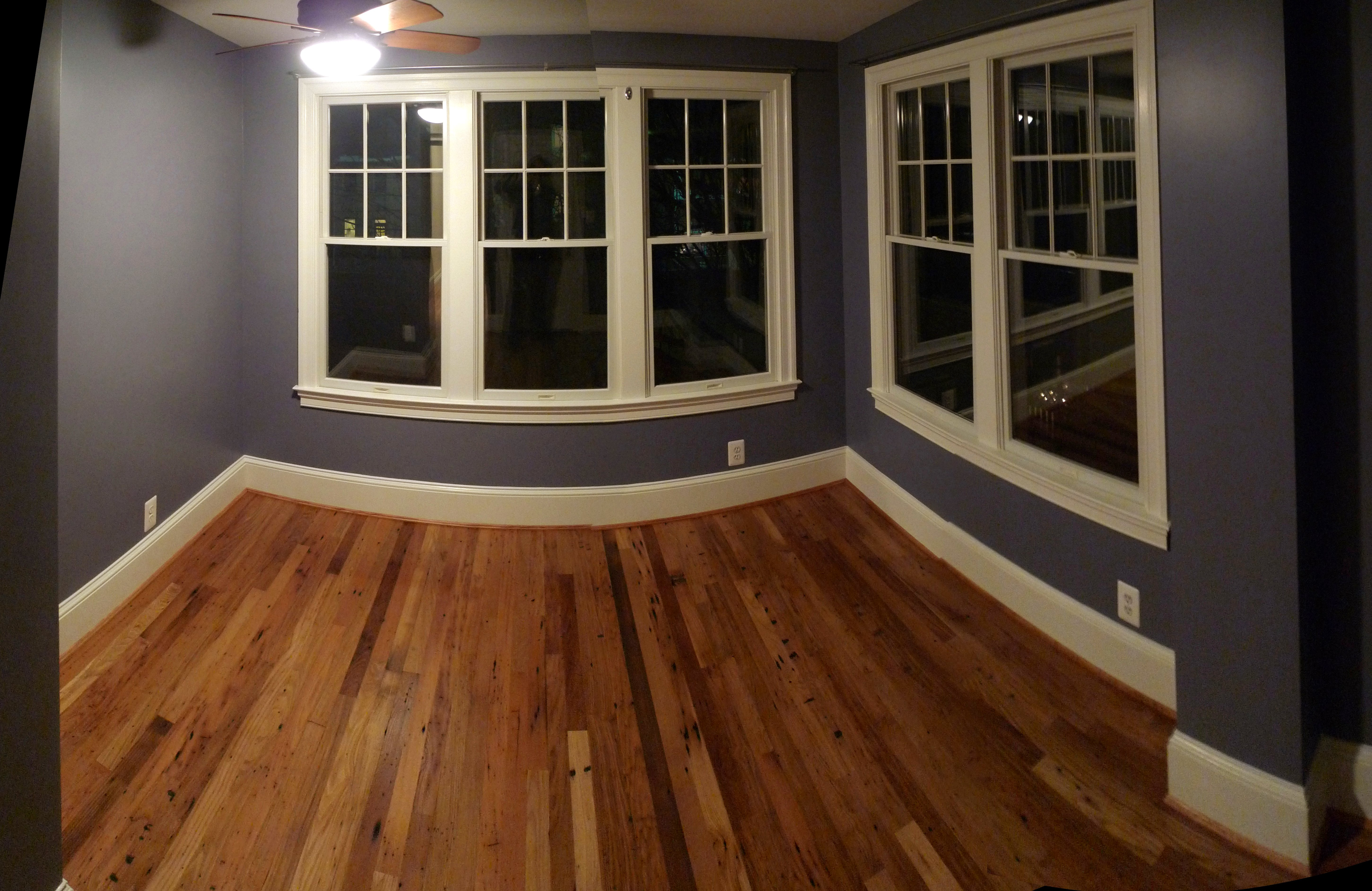
Reclaimed mixed hardwoods floor

When reclaimed wood is used for wood flooring, it is taken for reuse from many different sources, including old warehouses, boxcars, coal mines, gymnasiums, homes, wine barrels, historic barns, and more. Wood can also be recovered from rivers in the form of fallen trees along with logs that were once sent downstream by lumber mills. Parquet flooring in herringbone, double herringbone, or chevron style can be reclaimed from buildings typically undergoing demolition or renovation. Typically the flooring will have been in its original home for over 100 years. Occasionally very rare woods, including old growth teak, mahogany, oak and more exotic timbers such as panga, wenge, bubinga are utilized. Some of these woods, eg Rhodesian Teak are simply not in production any more, due to forestry or importation limits. The process of reclamation includes salvage, transport, cleaning of old bitumen residue, refitting and sanding with finishing by lacquering or oiling.

Using reclaimed wood can earn credits towards achieving LEED project certification. Because reclaimed wood is considered recycled content, it meets the Materials & Resources criteria for LEED certification and because some reclaimed lumber products are FSC certified, they can qualify for LEED credits under the "certified wood" category. Besides qualifying for LEED points, reclaimed wood is drawing an increasing number of home and business owners, architects, and contractors to choosing reclaimed wood flooring for a few significant reasons:

- Environmental responsibility and sustainability
- Old growth wood is present in reclaimed examples in a time when it is increasingly difficult to source newly cut old growth lumber due to environmental protections and diminished availability
- Old growth, tight growth rings found in many historic structures adds durability and aesthetic value to flooring
- Client demand for green building materials has greatly increased since 2015
- Developing countries are showing significant increases in green building certification

== Bamboo ==
Bamboo flooring is made from a fast-growing renewable "timber" (bamboo is actually a grass). It is natural anti-bacterial, water-resistant and extremely durable. DIY installation is easy, as bamboo flooring is available with tongue-and-groove technology familiar in hardwood/laminate alternatives. Bamboo flooring is often more expensive than laminate, though it is generally cheaper than traditional hardwood flooring. Some bamboo floors are less sustainable than others, as they contain the toxic substance formaldehyde (rather than natural-base adhesives).

== Cork ==
Cork flooring is made by removing the bark of the Cork Oak (Quercus Suber) without harming the tree (if harvested correctly); as such, it is a renewable and sustainable resource. It is naturally anti-microbial and has excellent insulation properties, ensuring minimal heat loss and comfortable warm walking surface. Cork is resilient and 'springs back' preventing imprints due to heavy traffic and furniture, it also provides excellent noise insulation. While cork itself is low in volatile organic compounds (VOC) emissions, it is important to check the finish applied. Cork is not suitable for bathrooms, as it absorbs moisture.

== Linoleum ==
Linoleum is made from dried and milled flax seeds mixed with other plant material (pine resins, wood flour, ground cork) with a jute backing, all completely natural materials which come from renewable sources and are 100% biodegradable. All by products and waste is milled and used. Linoleum does not fade, as the pigments are embedded in the structure. It is anti-static, repelling dirt, dust and other small particles, making it hypoallergenic – for this reason it is often used by people with respiratory issues (asthma, allergies). It is also fire-resistant and does not require additional fire-retardants finish.

== Rubber ==
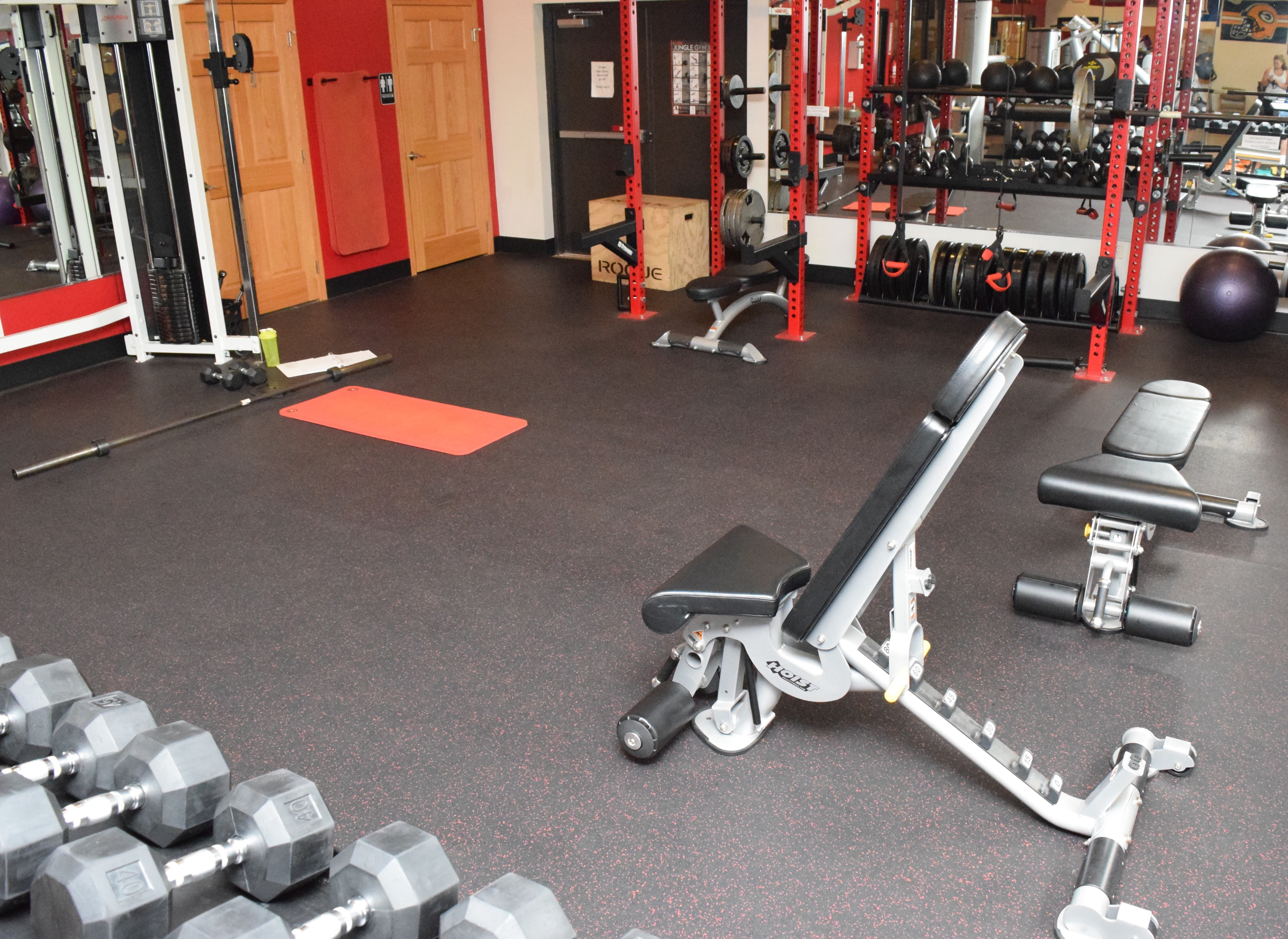
Dunamis Therapy and Fitness using Greatmats recycled rubber flooring in its weight training area.

Rubber flooring used to be made from a rubber tree, a 100% renewable resource. Today styrene-butadiene rubber (SBR), a general-purpose synthetic rubber, produced from a copolymer of styrene and butadiene is used for "rubber flooring". It is easy to install and maintain, is anti-static and provides effective sound insulation and vibration reduction. Rubber flooring is also resistant to fading and cigarette burns. Most rubber flooring is made from synthetic rubber, which is not a sustainable product.

== Natural and recycled carpet ==
There are carpets which are sustainable, using natural fibers such as cotton, sisal, wool, jute and coconut husk. Handmade Citapore rugs include a wide range of sustainable flooring material as these rugs are generally made from cotton (both virgin and recycled), jute, rayon and cotton chennile. It is also possible to have carpet made completely from recycled polyethylene terephthalate used for food/drink containers. Recycled nylon is also a common material used and the process takes carpet made with nylon 6 fibers and recycles it into brand new nylon carpet. This process can be repeated numerous times and in 2009 alone, Shaw's Evergreen facility recycled over 100 million pounds of carpet. This is sustainable and it reduces material sent to landfill; further it uses dyeing methods that are less polluting and require less energy than other flooring. This flooring is sustainable when used alongside eco-friendly adhesive, as some products may have toxic finishes added (stain/fireproofing) that are not considered sustainable.

== Coconut timber ==
Coconut timber is a hardwood substitute from coconut palm trees. Coconut palm wood flooring is cheaper than teak, with the wood hardness comparable to mahogany. Coconut palm wood is made from matured (60 to 80 years old) coconut palm trees that no longer bear fruits.

== See also ==
- Botanol, an alternative to vinyl or laminate flooring with a high renewable content

== General References ==
- Dovetail Partners Inc. Life Cycle Assessment of Flooring Materials: A Guide to Intelligent Selection
- University of Tennessee Bamboo Flooring: Better than Wood?
