= C3H5NO2 =

The molecular formula C_{3}H_{5}NO_{2} (molar mass: 87.08 g/mol, exact mass: 87.0320 u) may refer to:

- Glycidamide
- 2-Oxazolidone
- Dehydroalanine, or 2-aminoacrylate
