= Diethylene glycol diglycidyl ether =

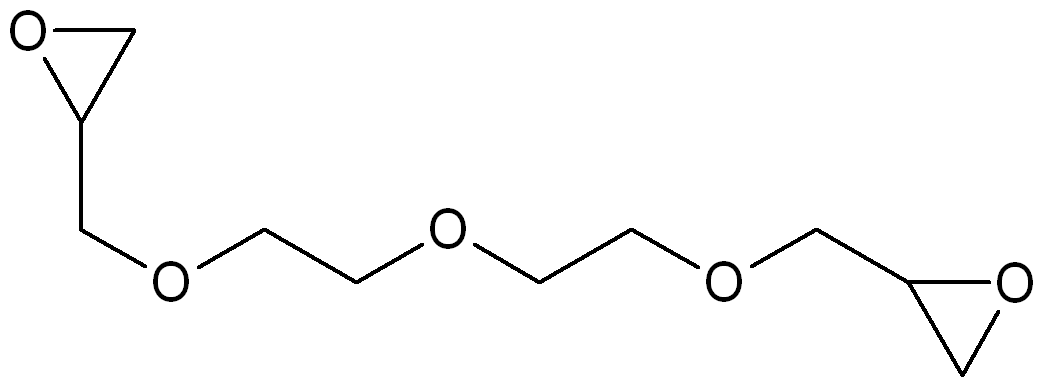

Names
- IUPAC name 2-[2-[2-(oxiran-2-ylmethoxy)ethoxy]ethoxymethyl]oxirane
- Other names Diethylene glycol diglycidyl ether; 2,2'-(Oxybis(2,1-ethanediyloxymethylene))bisoxirane; 4,7,10-Trioxatridecane, 1,2:12,13-diepoxy-; BRN 1308085; Diethylene glycol bis-glycidyl ether; Diglycidyl diethyleneglycol ether; EINECS 224-122-0; NSC 517936; UNII-DU5YP0O31R; 2,2'-(Oxybis(ethyleneoxymethylene))bisoxirane; Ether, bis(2-(2,3-epoxypropoxy)ethyl); Oxirane, 2,2'-(oxybis(2,1-ethanediyloxymethylene))bis-; Oxirane, 2,2'-(oxybis(2,1-ethanediyloxymethylene))bis- (9CI)

Identifiers
| CAS Number | 4206-61-5 |
| 3D model (JSmol) | Interactive image |
| ChemSpider | 311676 |
| ECHA InfoCard | 100.021.930 |
| EC Number | 224-122-0 |
| PubChem CID | 351024 |
| UNII | DU5YP0O31R |
| CompTox Dashboard (EPA) | DTXSID70960086 |
- InChI: InChI=1S/C10H18O5/c1(3-12-5-9-7-14-9)11-2-4-13-6-10-8-15-10/h9-10H,1-8H2 Key: SEFYJVFBMNOLBK-UHFFFAOYSA-N
- SMILES: C1C(O1)COCCOCCOCC2CO2

Properties
| Chemical formula | C_{10}H_{18}O_{5} |
| Molar mass | 218.249 g·mol^{−1} |

Hazards
- GHS labelling
| Pictograms | (GHS07: Exclamation mark) |
| Signal word | Warning |
| Hazard statements | H315, H319, H335 |
| Precautionary statements | P261, P264, P272, P280, P302+P352, P305+P351+P338, P321, P333+P313, P362+P364, P501 |
- Except where otherwise noted, data are given for materials in their standard state (at 25 °C [77 °F], 100 kPa). Infobox references

Diethylene glycol diglycidyl ether (DEGDGE) is an organic chemical in the glycidyl ether family with the formula C_{10}H_{18}O_{5.}. The oxirane functionality makes it useful as a reactive diluent for epoxy resin viscosity reduction.

== Manufacture ==
The product is manufactured by adding diethylene glycol and a Lewis acid catalyst into a reactor and streaming in epichlorohydrin slowly to control the exothermic reaction. This forms the halohydrin, which is dehydrochlorinated with sodium hydroxide. This forms the diglycidyl ether. The waste products are sodium chloride, water and excess sodium hydroxide (alkaline brine). One of the quality control tests would involve measuring the epoxy value by determination of the epoxy equivalent weight.

== Uses ==
A key use is as a modifier for epoxy resins as a reactive diluent and flexibilizer. The molecule has 2 oxirane functionalities, and thus does not at as a chain terminator but it modifies and reduces the viscosity of epoxy resins. These reactive diluent modified epoxy resins may then be further formulated into CASE applications: coatings, (including antimicrobial versions) adhesives, sealants, and elastomers. The use of the diluent does effect mechanical properties and microstructure of epoxy resins.

The species has also been used to synthesize other chemical compounds.

The toxicology has been studied.

== See also ==
- Epoxide
- Glycidol

== External websites ==
- Cargill Reactive Diluents
