= Poly(propylene glycol) diglycidyl ether =

Names
- Other names Polyoxypropylene diglycidyl ether; PPGDGE

Identifiers
CAS Number	26142-30-3
ECHA InfoCard	100.130.913
CompTox Dashboard (EPA)	DTXSID00892240

Properties
Chemical formula	(C_{3}H_{6}O)_{n}.C_{6}H_{10}O_{3}
Molar mass	Variable
- Except where otherwise noted, data are given for materials in their standard state (at 25 °C [77 °F], 100 kPa). Infobox references

Poly(propylene glycol) diglycidyl ether (PPGDGE) is an organic chemical in the glycidyl ether family. There are a number of variations depending on the starting molecular weight of the polypropylene glycol. They have the formula (C_{3}H_{6}O)_{n}.C_{6}H_{10}O_{3} and the IUPAC name is Poly[oxy(methyl-1,2-ethanediyl)],a-(2-oxiranylmethyl)-w-(2-oxiranylmethoxy)- A key use is as a modifier for epoxy resins as a reactive diluent and flexibilizer. It is REACH registered.

== Manufacturing ==
The product is made by taking polypropylene glycol and epichlorohydrin and reacting in the presence of a Lewis acid catalyst to form a halohydrin. The next step is dehydrochlorination with sodium hydroxide. This forms the diglycidyl ether. Waste products are sodium chloride, water and excess sodium hydroxide (alkaline brine). One of the quality control tests would involve measuring the epoxy value by determination of the epoxy equivalent weight.

== Use ==
The molecule has 2 oxirane functionalities, and so a key use is modifying and reducing the viscosity of epoxy resins. These reactive diluent modified epoxy resins may then be further formulated into CASE applications: coatings, adhesives, sealants, and elastomers. It produces epoxy coatings with high impact resistance. The use of the diluent does effect mechanical properties and microstructure of epoxy resins.

Synthesis of waterborne polymers has been a feature with this substance. As the basic building block is propylene oxide, there are 3 carbons per oxygen on the backbone. This confers some degree of water miscibility though not as good as ethylene oxide based molecules.

The material maybe used to produce polymers with shape memory and good thermomechanical properties. In addition, the molecule is used to synthesize other molecules.

== Toxicology ==
The toxicology of the material is reasonably well known.

== See also ==
- Epoxide
- Glycidol

== External websites ==
- AALCHEM DE209
- Cargill Reactive Diluents
- Chinese produced material
