= Acrylamide =

Organic chemical compound

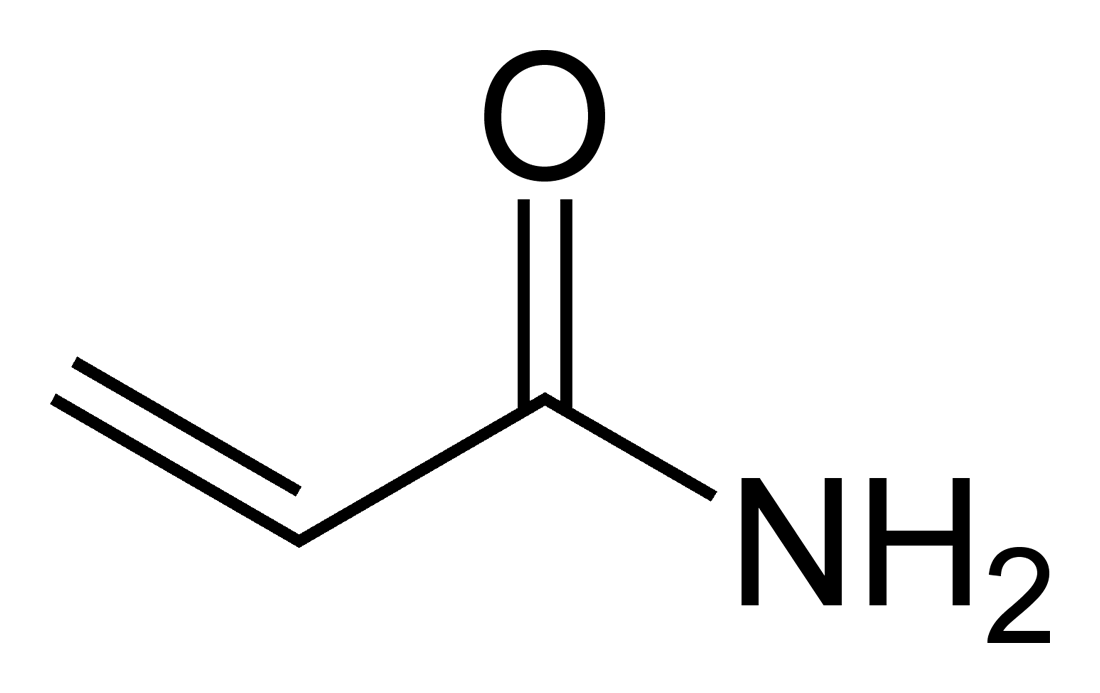

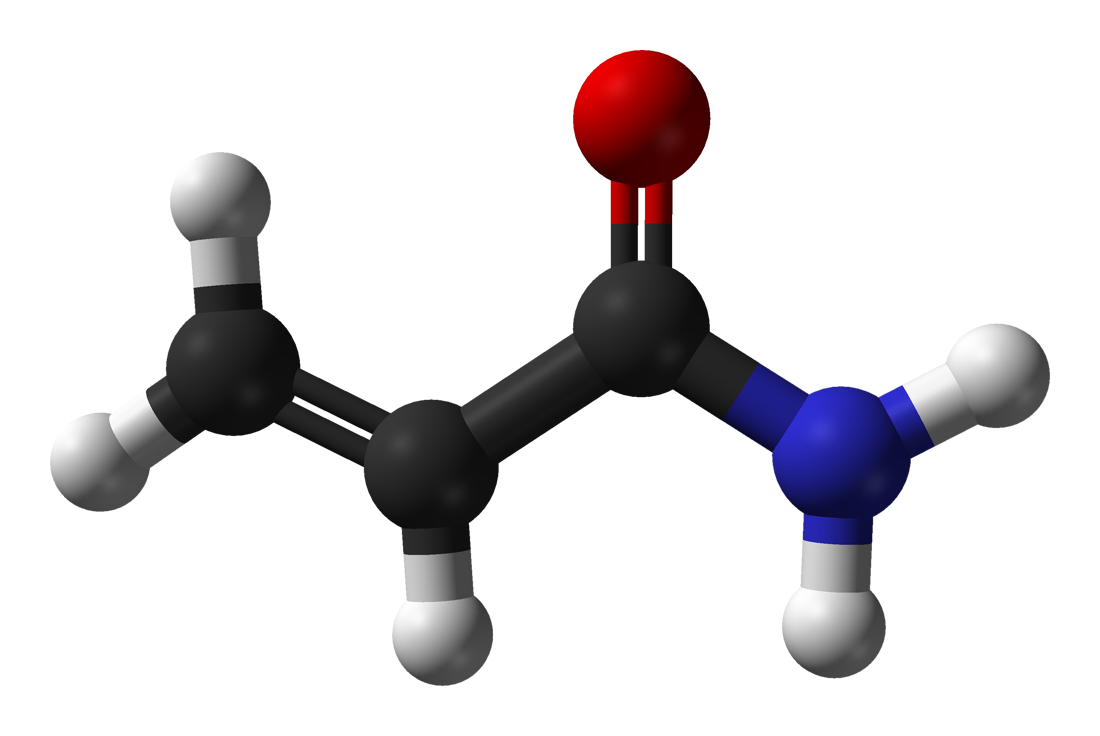

Names
- Preferred IUPAC name Prop-2-enamide
- Other names Acrylamide; Acrylic amide

Identifiers
| CAS Number | 79-06-1 |
| 3D model (JSmol) | Interactive image; Interactive image |
| ChEBI | CHEBI:28619 |
| ChEMBL | ChEMBL348107 |
| ChemSpider | 6331 |
| ECHA InfoCard | 100.001.067 |
| IUPHAR/BPS | 4553 |
| KEGG | C01659 |
| PubChem CID | 6579 |
| UNII | 20R035KLCI |
| CompTox Dashboard (EPA) | DTXSID5020027 |
- InChI: InChI=1S/C3H5NO/c1-2-3(4)5/h2H,1H2,(H2,4,5) Key: HRPVXLWXLXDGHG-UHFFFAOYSA-N; InChI=1/C3H5NO/c1-2-3(4)5/h2H,1H2,(H2,4,5) Key: HRPVXLWXLXDGHG-UHFFFAOYAS
- SMILES: O=C(C=C)N; C=CC(=O)N

Properties
| Chemical formula | C_{3}H_{5}NO |
| Molar mass | 71.079 g·mol^{−1} |
| Appearance | white crystalline solid, no odor |
| Density | 1.322 g/cm^{3} |
| Melting point | 84.5 °C (184.1 °F; 357.6 K) |
| Boiling point | None (polymerization); decomposes at 175-300°C |
| Solubility in water | 390 g/L (25 °C) |

Hazards
- Occupational safety and health (OHS/OSH)
| Main hazards | potential occupational carcinogen |
- GHS labelling
| Pictograms | (GHS06: Toxic) (GHS08: Health hazard) |
| Hazard statements | H301, H312, H315, H317, H319, H332, H340, H350, H361, H372 |
| Precautionary statements | P201, P280, P301+P310, P305+P351+P338, P308+P313 |
| NFPA 704 (fire diamond) | 2 2 2 |
| Flash point | 138 °C (280 °F; 411 K) |
| Autoignition temperature | 424 °C (795 °F; 697 K) |
- Lethal dose or concentration (LD, LC)
| LD_{50} (median dose) | 100-200 mg/kg (mammal, oral); 107 mg/kg (mouse, oral); 150 mg/kg (rabbit, oral); 150 mg/kg (guinea pig, oral); 124 mg/kg (rat, oral) |
- NIOSH (US health exposure limits)
| PEL (Permissible) | TWA 0.3 mg/m^{3} [skin] |
| REL (Recommended) | Ca TWA 0.03 mg/m^{3} [skin] |
| IDLH (Immediate danger) | 60 mg/m^{3} |
| Safety data sheet (SDS) | ICSC 0091 |
- Except where otherwise noted, data are given for materials in their standard state (at 25 °C [77 °F], 100 kPa). verify (what is ?) Infobox references

Acrylamide (or acrylic amide) is an organic compound with the chemical formula CH_{2}=CHC(O)NH_{2}. It is a white odorless solid, soluble in water and several organic solvents. From the chemistry perspective, acrylamide is a vinyl-substituted primary amide (CONH_{2}). It is produced industrially mainly as a precursor to polyacrylamides, which find many uses as water-soluble thickeners and flocculation agents.

Acrylamide forms in burnt areas of food, particularly starchy foods like potatoes, when cooked with high heat, above 120 °C (248 °F). Despite health scares following this discovery in 2002, and its classification as a probable carcinogen, there is ongoing debate as to whether acrylamide consumed through diet is likely to cause cancer in humans; Cancer Research UK described the idea of burnt food causing cancer as unlikely, and not based on reliable evidence.

== Production ==
Acrylamide can be prepared by the hydration of acrylonitrile, which is catalyzed enzymatically:

CH_{2}=CHCN + H_{2}O → CH_{2}=CHC(O)NH_{2}

This reaction also is catalyzed by sulfuric acid as well as various metal salts. Treatment of acrylonitrile with sulfuric acid gives acrylamide sulfate, CH=CHC(O)NH_{2}·H_{2}SO_{4}. This salt can be converted to acrylamide with a base or to methyl acrylate with methanol.

== Uses ==
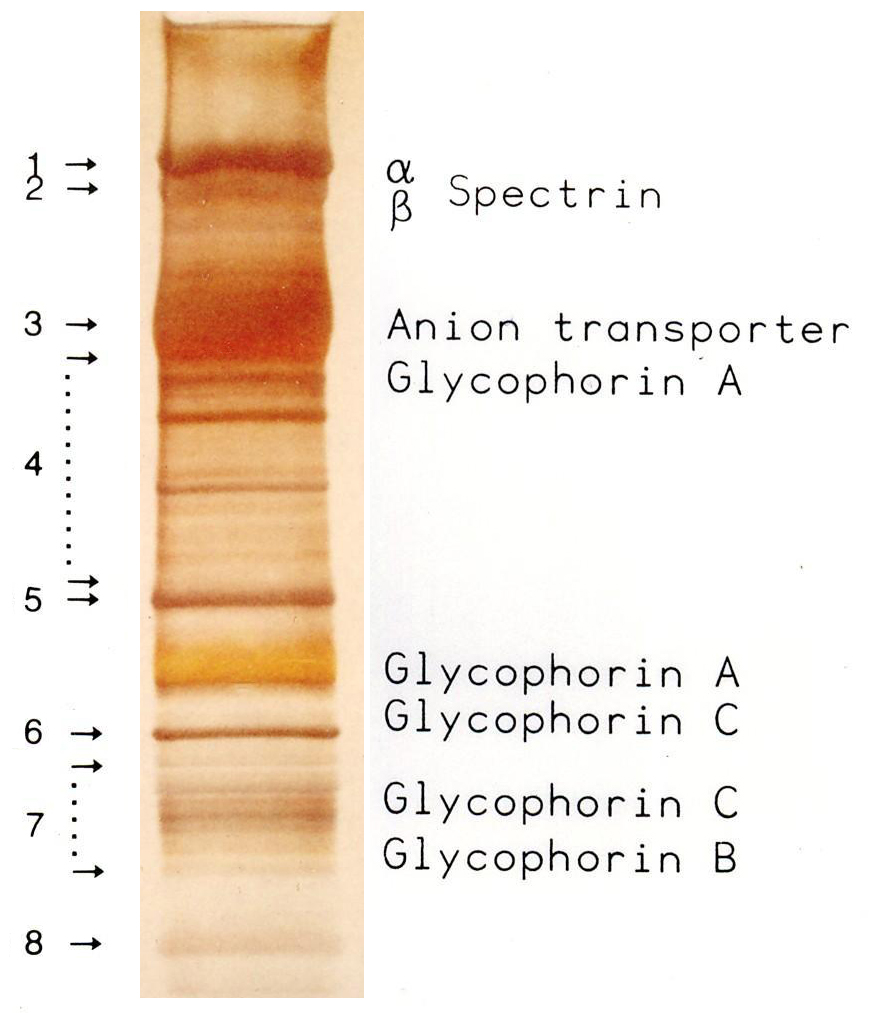
Proteins of the erythrocyte separated by use of polyacrylamide gels (SDS-PAGE)

The majority of acrylamide is used to manufacture various polymers, especially polyacrylamide. This water-soluble polymer, which has very low toxicity, is widely used as thickener and flocculating agent. These functions are valuable in the purification of drinking water, corrosion inhibition, mineral extraction, and paper making. Polyacrylamide gels are routinely used in medicine and biochemistry for purification and assays.

== Toxicity and carcinogenicity ==
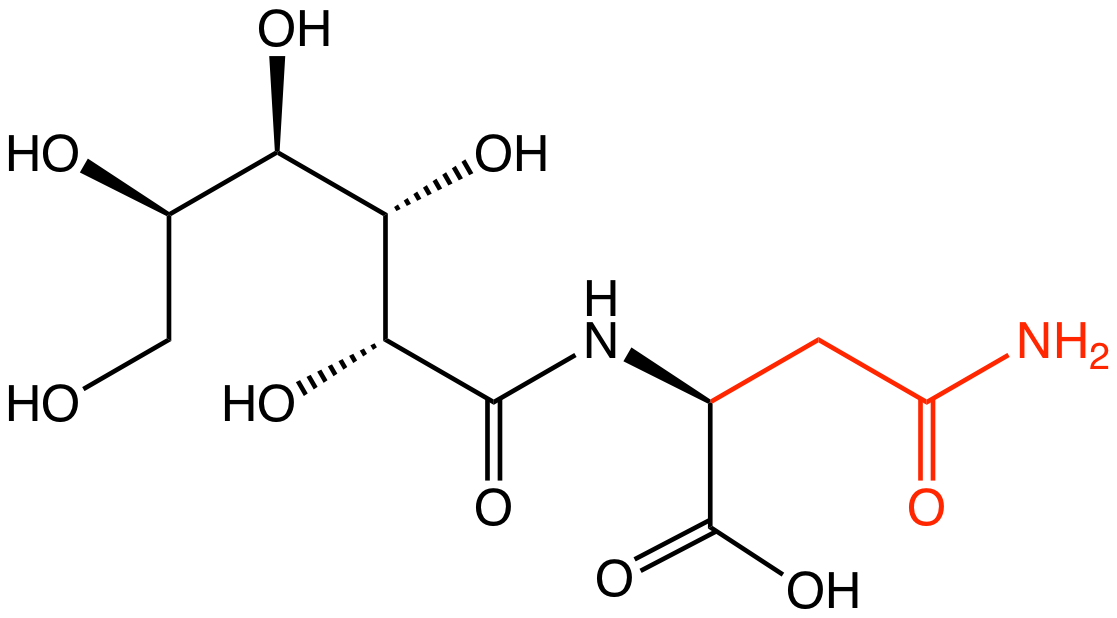
N-(D-glucos-1-yl)-L-asparagine, precursor to acrylamide in cooked food

Acrylamide can arise in some cooked foods via a series of steps by the reaction of the amino acid asparagine and glucose. This condensation, one of the Maillard reactions, followed by dehydrogenation produces N-(D-glucos-1-yl)-L-asparagine, which upon pyrolysis generates some acrylamide.

The discovery in 2002 that some cooked foods contain acrylamide attracted significant attention to its possible biological effects. The International Agency for Research on Cancer (IARC), the U.S. National Toxicology Program, and the U.S. Environmental Protection Agency have classified it as a probable carcinogen, although epidemiological studies (as of 2019) suggest that dietary acrylamide consumption does not significantly increase people's risk of developing cancer.

=== Europe ===
According to the European Food Safety Authority, the main toxicity risks of acrylamide are "Neurotoxicity, adverse effects on male reproduction, developmental toxicity and carcinogenicity". However, according to their research, there is no concern on non-neoplastic effects. Furthermore, while the relation between consumption of acrylamide and cancer in rats and mice has been shown, it is still unclear whether acrylamide consumption has an effect on the risk of developing cancer in humans, and existing epidemiological studies in humans are very limited and do not show any relation between acrylamide and cancer. Food industry workers exposed to twice the average level of acrylamide do not exhibit higher cancer rates.

=== United States ===
Acrylamide is classified as an extremely hazardous substance in the United States as defined in Section 302 of the U.S. Emergency Planning and Community Right-to-Know Act (42 U.S.C. 11002), and is subject to strict reporting requirements by facilities which produce, store, or use it in significant quantities.

Acrylamide is considered a potential occupational carcinogen by U.S. government agencies and classified as a Group 2A carcinogen by the IARC. The Occupational Safety and Health Administration and the National Institute for Occupational Safety and Health have set dermal occupational exposure limits at 0.03 mg/m^{3} over an eight-hour workday.

The state of California's Safe Drinking Water and Toxic Enforcement Act, passed in 1986, requires products containing acrylamide to be sold with a warning label stating that the substance is known to cause cancer, birth defects, and reproductive harm. The California Chamber of Commerce challenged this requirement in 2019, arguing that it violated First Amendment rights. In June 2025, a Federal District Court in California ruled that it was unconstitutional.

=== Opinions of health organizations ===
Baking, grilling or broiling food causes significant concentrations of acrylamide. This discovery in 2002 led to international health concerns. However, subsequent research has found that it is not likely that the acrylamides in burnt or well-cooked food cause cancer in humans; Cancer Research UK categorizes the idea that burnt food causes cancer as a "myth".

The American Cancer Society says that laboratory studies have shown that acrylamide is likely to be a carcinogen, but that as of 2019 evidence from epidemiological studies suggests that dietary acrylamide is unlikely to raise the risk of people developing most common types of cancer.

=== Hazards ===
Radiolabeled acrylamide is also a skin irritant and may be a tumor initiator in the skin, potentially increasing risk for skin cancer. Symptoms of acrylamide exposure include dermatitis in the exposed area, and peripheral neuropathy.

Laboratory research has found that some phytochemicals may have the potential to be developed into drugs which could alleviate the toxicity of acrylamide.

=== Mechanism of action ===
Glycidamide is the dangerous metabolite produced from acrylamide, which in turn is produced by heating certain proteins.

Acrylamide is metabolized to the genotoxic derivative glycidamide. On the other hand, acrylamide and glycidamide can be detoxified via conjugation with glutathione.

== Occurrence in food ==
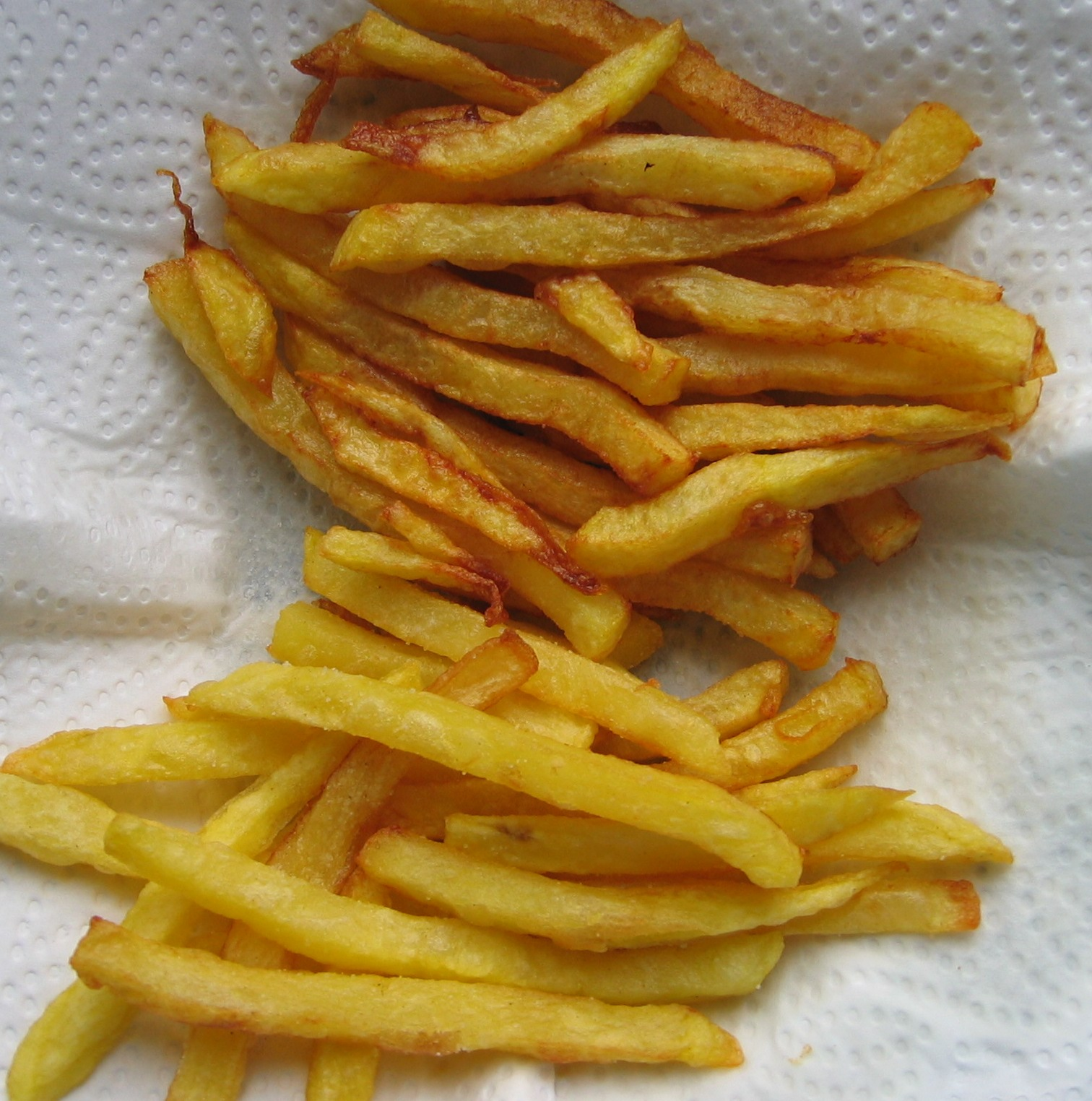
French fries are cooked to a high temperature.

Acrylamide was discovered in foods, mainly in starchy foods, such as potato chips, French fries, and bread that had been heated higher than 120 °C (248 °F). Production of acrylamide in the heating process was shown to be temperature-dependent. It was not found in food that had been boiled, or in foods that were not heated.

Acrylamide has been found in roasted barley tea (Japanese: mugicha). The barley is roasted so it is dark brown prior to being steeped in hot water. The roasting process produced 200–600 micrograms/kg of acrylamide in roasted barley tea. This is less than the >1000 micrograms/kg found in potato crisps and other fried whole potato snack foods cited in the same study, and it is unclear how much of this enters the drink to be ingested. Rice cracker and sweet potato levels were lower than in potatoes. Potatoes cooked whole were found to have significantly lower acrylamide levels than the others, suggesting a link between food preparation method and acrylamide levels.

Acrylamide levels appear to rise as food is heated for longer periods of time. Although researchers are still unsure of the precise mechanisms by which acrylamide forms in foods, many believe it is a byproduct of the Maillard reaction. In fried or baked goods, acrylamide may be produced by the reaction between asparagine and reducing sugars (fructose, glucose, etc.) or reactive carbonyls at temperatures above 120 °C (248 °F).

Later studies have found acrylamide in black olives, coffee, dried pears, dried plums, and peanuts.

The U.S. Food and Drug Administration has analyzed a variety of U.S. food products for levels of acrylamide since 2002.

== Occurrence in cigarettes ==
Cigarette smoking is a major acrylamide source. It has been shown in one study to cause an increase in blood acrylamide levels three-fold greater than any dietary factor.

== See also ==
- Acrolein
- Acrydite: research on this compound has cast light on acrylamide
- Alkyl nitrites
- Deep-frying
- Deep fryer
- Heterocyclic amines
- Polycyclic aromatic hydrocarbons
- Substance of very high concern
- Vacuum fryer
