= Castor oil =

Vegetable oil pressed from castor beans

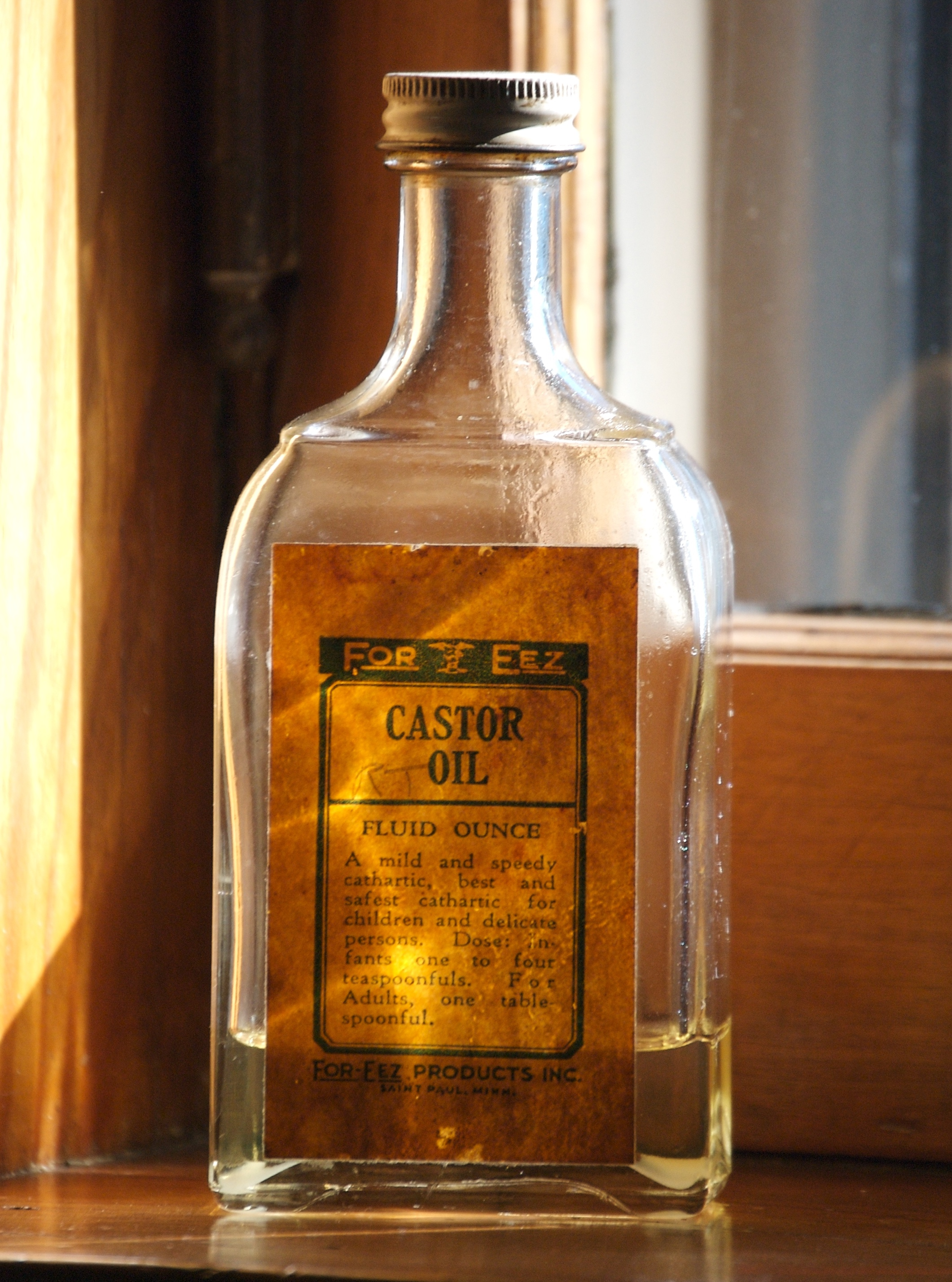
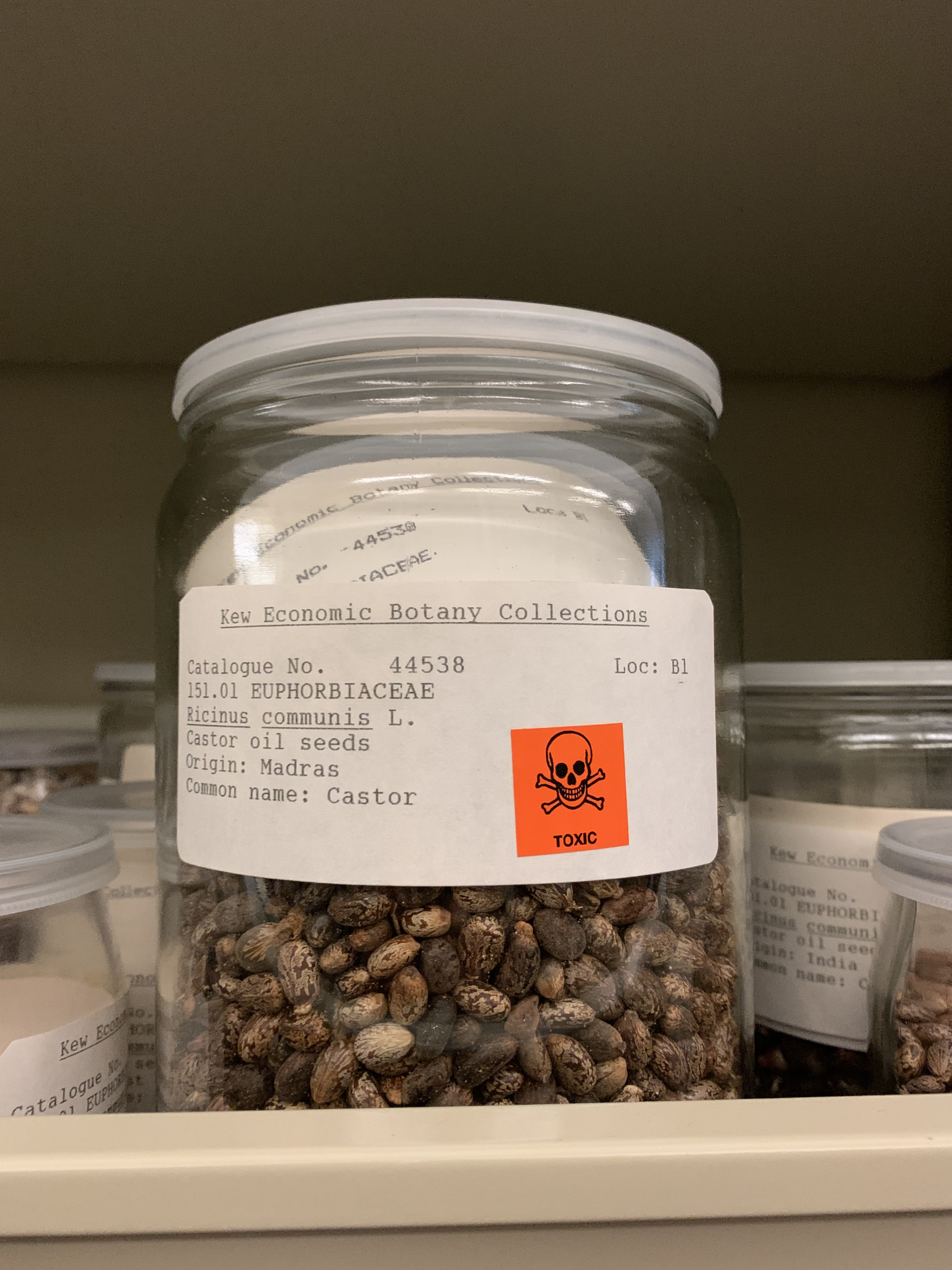
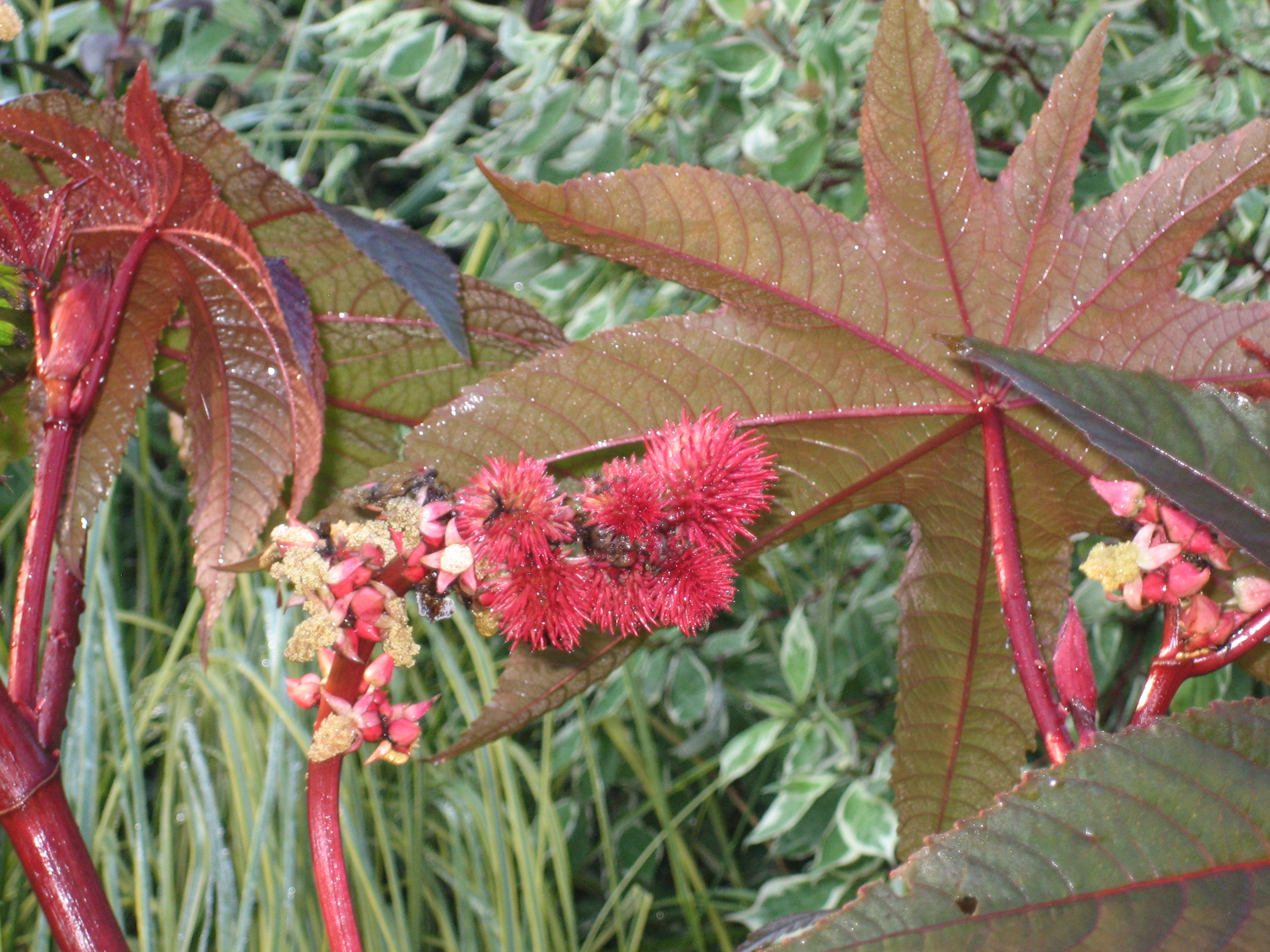

Castor oil is a vegetable oil pressed from castor beans, the seeds of the plant Ricinus communis. The seeds are 40 to 60 percent oil. It is a colourless or pale yellow liquid with a distinct taste and odor. Its boiling point is 313 °C (595 °F) and its density is 0.961 g/cm^{3}. It includes a mixture of triglycerides in which about 90 percent of fatty acids are ricinoleates. Oleic acid and linoleic acid are the other significant components.

Some 270,000–360,000 tonnes (600×10^{6}–790×10^{6} lb) of castor oil are produced annually for a variety of uses, including soaps, lubricants, hydraulic and brake fluids, paints, dyes, coatings, inks, cold-resistant plastics, waxes and polishes, nylon, and perfumes.

== Etymology ==
The name probably comes from a confusion between the Ricinus plant that produces it and another plant, the Vitex agnus-castus. An alternative etymology, though, suggests that it was used as a replacement for castoreum.

== History ==
Use of castor oil as a laxative is attested to in the c. 1550 BC Ebers Papyrus, and it was in use several centuries earlier. Midwifery manuals from the 19th century recommended castor oil and 10 drops of laudanum for relieving "false pains".

== Composition ==
Structure of the major component of castor oil: triester of glycerol and ricinoleic acid

Castor oil is well known as a source of ricinoleic acid, a monounsaturated, 18-carbon fatty acid. Among fatty acids, ricinoleic acid is unusual in that it has a hydroxyl functional group. Because of this functional group, ricinoleic acid is more polar than most fatty acid. The alcohol group underpins the conversion of ricinoleic acid into sebacic acid and 2-octanol.

Because of its ricinoleic acid content, castor oil is a valuable chemical in feedstocks, commanding a higher price than other seed oils. As an example, in July 2007, Indian castor oil sold for about USD $0.90 per kilogram ($0.41/lb), whereas U.S. soybean, sunflower, and canola oils sold for about $0.30 per kilogram ($0.14/lb).

Average composition of castor seed oil / fatty acids
Acid name	Range	Type
Ricinoleic acid	85–95	ω−9
Oleic acid	2–6	ω−9
Linoleic acid	1–5	ω−6
α-Linolenic acid	0.5–1	ω−3
Stearic acid	0.5–1	saturated
Palmitic acid	0.5–1	saturated
Dihydroxystearic acid	0.3–0.5	saturated
Others	0.2–0.5	

== Human uses ==
Castor oil has been used orally to relieve constipation or to evacuate the bowels before intestinal surgery. The laxative effect of castor oil is attributed to ricinoleic acid, which is produced by hydrolysis in the small intestine. Use of castor oil for simple constipation is medically discouraged because it may cause violent diarrhea.

=== Food and preservative ===
In the food industry, food-grade castor oil is used in food additives, flavorings, candy (e.g., polyglycerol polyricinoleate in chocolate), as a mold inhibitor, and in packaging. Polyoxyethylated castor oil (e.g., Kolliphor EL) is also used in the food industries. In India, Pakistan, and Nepal, food grains are preserved by the application of castor oil. It stops rice, wheat, and legumes from rotting. For example, the pigeon pea is commonly available coated in oil for extended storage.

=== Emollient ===
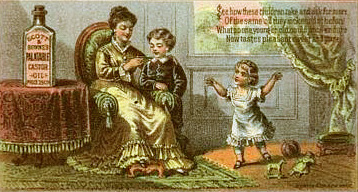
Advertisement of castor oil as a medicine by Scott & Bowne Company, 19th century

Castor oil has been used in cosmetic products, included in creams, and used as a moisturizer. It is often combined with zinc oxide to form an emollient and astringent, zinc and castor oil cream, which is commonly used to treat infants for nappy rash. Hydrogenated castor oil is also known as trihydroxystearin, which is used in cosmetics and personal care systems.

=== Medicine ===
Castor oil is used as a vehicle for serums administering steroid hormones such as estradiol valerate via intramuscular or subcutaneous injection.

=== Alternative medicine ===
Despite the lack of evidence, castor oil is sometimes claimed to be able to cure diseases. According to the American Cancer Society, "available scientific evidence does not support claims that castor oil on the skin cures cancer or any other disease."

=== Childbirth ===
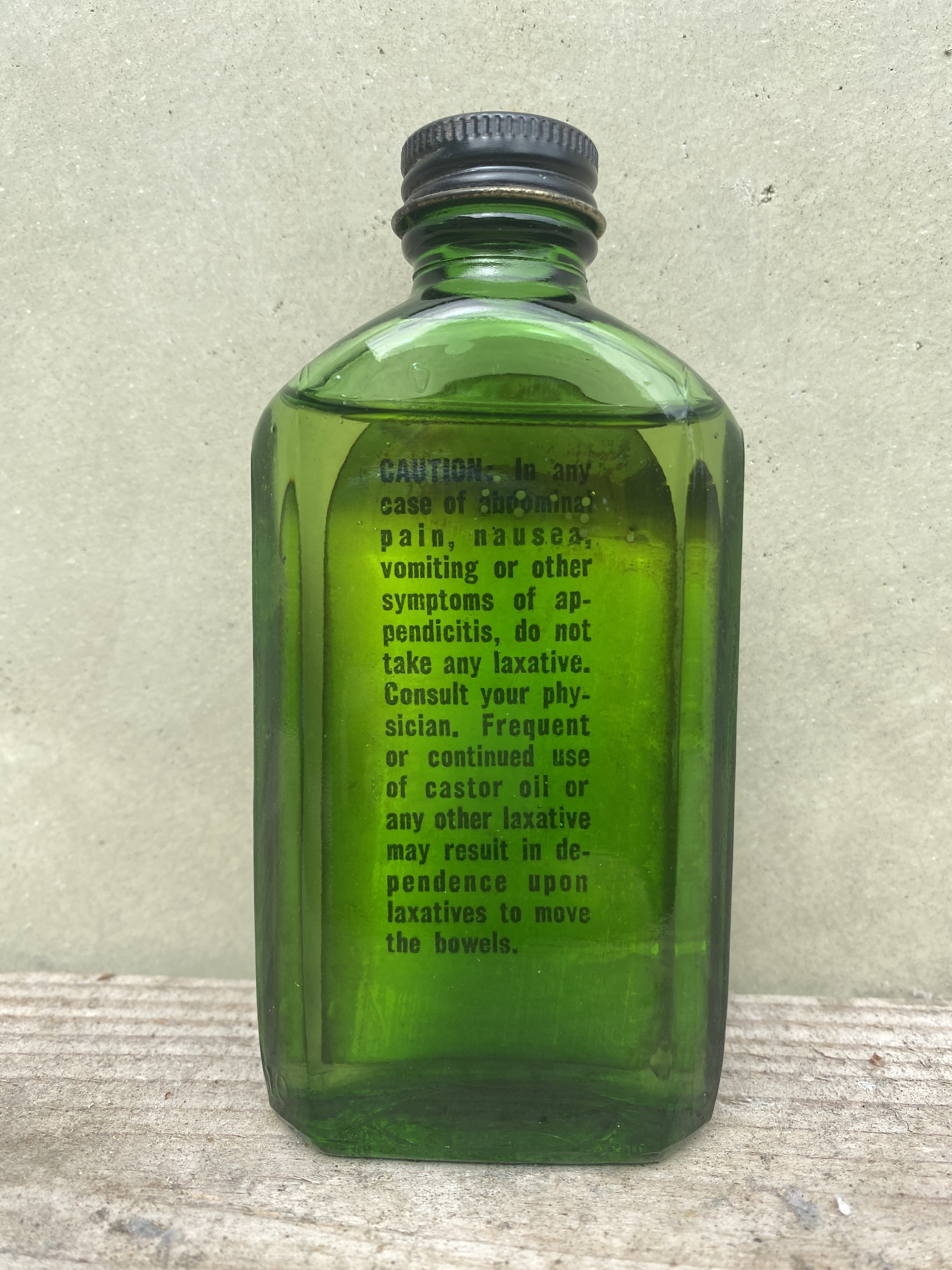
Warning label on a bottle of Kellogg's Perfected Tasteless Castor Oil, Spencer Kellogg & Sons, Inc., New York

Castor oil is still used for labor induction in environments where modern drugs are not available; a review of pharmacologic, mechanical, and "complementary" methods of labor induction published in 2024 by the American Journal of Obstetrics and Gynecology stated that castor oil's physiological effect is poorly understood but "given gastrointestinal symptomatology, a prostaglandin mediation has been suggested but not confirmed." According to Drugs in Pregnancy and Lactation: A Reference Guide to Fetal and Neonatal Risk (2008), castor oil should not be ingested or used topically by pre-term pregnant women. There is no data on the potential toxicity of castor oil for nursing mothers. There is no high-quality research proving that ingestion of castor oil results in cervical ripening or induction of labor; there is, however, evidence that taking it causes nausea, vomiting, and diarrhea.

A systematic review of "three trials, involving 233 women, found there has not been enough research done to show the effects of castor oil on ripening the cervix or inducing labour or compare it to other methods of induction. The review found that all women who took castor oil by mouth felt nauseous. More research is needed into the effects of castor oil to induce labour."

=== Punishment ===
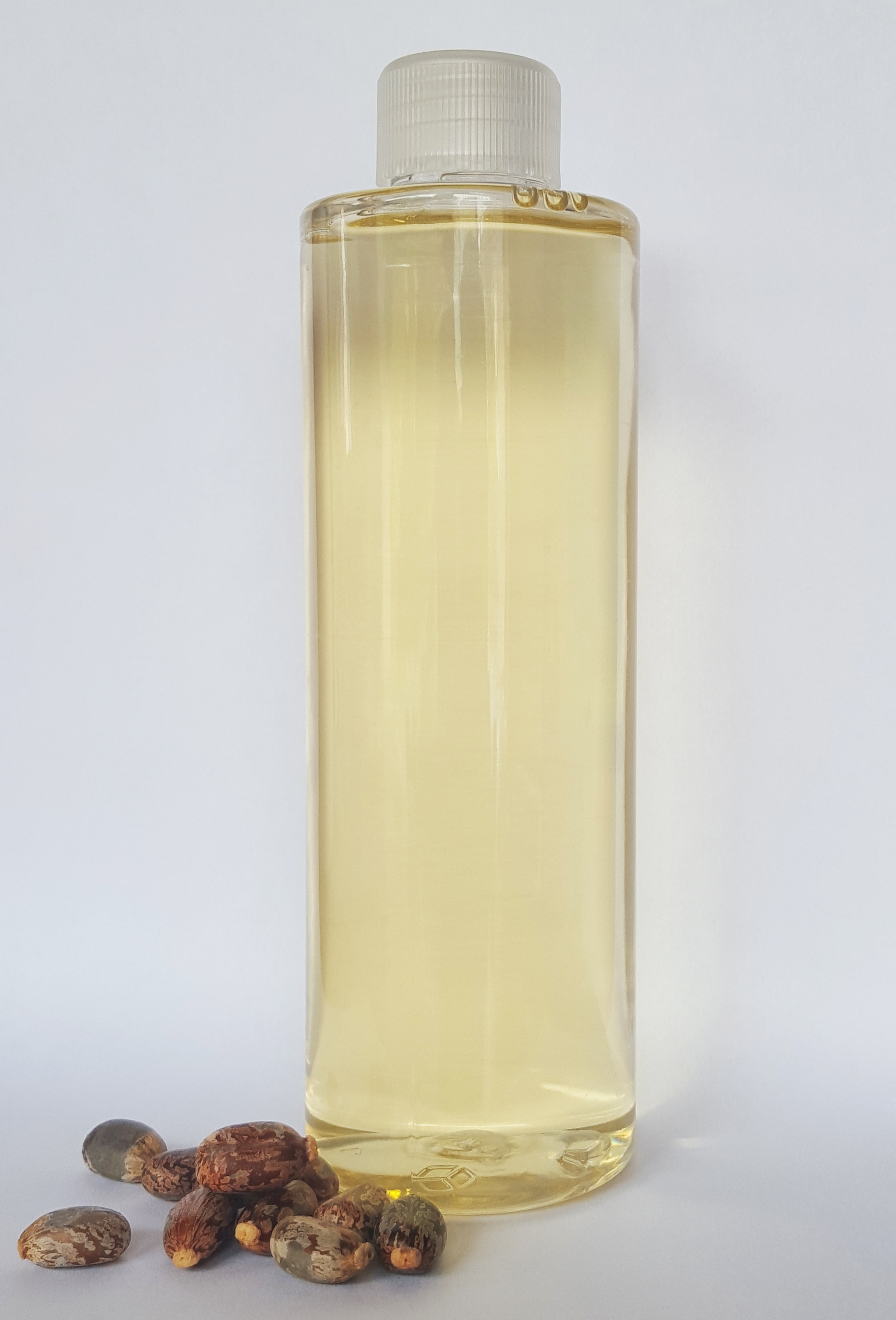
Castor oil

Since children commonly strongly dislike the taste of castor oil, some parents punished children with a dose of it. Physicians recommended against the practice because it may associate medicines with punishment and make children afraid of the doctor.

=== Use in torture ===
A heavy dose of castor oil could be used as a humiliating punishment for adults. Colonial officials used it in the British Raj (India) to deal with recalcitrant servants. Belgian military officials prescribed heavy doses of castor oil in the Congo Free State as a punishment for being too sick to work. Castor oil was also a tool of punishment favored by the Falangist and later Francoist Spain during and following the Spanish Civil War. Its use as a form of gendered violence to repress women was especially prominent. This began during the war where Nationalist forces would specifically target Republican-aligned women, both troops and civilians, who lived in Republican-controlled areas. The forced drinking of castor oil occurred alongside sexual assault, rape, torture and murder of these women.

Its most notorious use as punishment came in Fascist Italy under Benito Mussolini. It was a favorite tool used by the Blackshirts to intimidate and humiliate their opponents. Political dissidents were force-fed large quantities of castor oil by fascist squads so as to induce bouts of extreme diarrhea. This technique was said to have been originated by Gabriele D'Annunzio or Italo Balbo. This form of torture was potentially deadly, as the administration of the castor oil was often combined with nightstick beatings, especially to the rear, so that the resulting diarrhea would not only lead to dangerous dehydration but also infect the open wounds from the beatings. However, even those victims who survived had to bear the humiliation of the laxative effects resulting from excessive consumption of the oil.

== Industrial uses ==
=== Coatings ===
Castor oil is used as a biobased polyol in the polyurethane industry. The average functionality (number of hydroxyl groups per triglyceride molecule) of castor oil is 2.7, so it is widely used as a rigid polyol and in coatings. One particular use is in a polyurethane concrete where a castor-oil emulsion is reacted with an isocyanate (usually polymeric methylene diphenyl diisocyanate) and a cement and construction aggregate. This is applied fairly thickly as a slurry, which is self-levelling. This base is usually further coated with other systems to build a resilient floor. Castor oil is not a drying oil, meaning that it has a low reactivity with air compared with oils such as linseed oil and tung oil. However, dehydration of castor oil yields linoleic acids, which do have drying properties. In this process, the OH group on the ricinoleic acid along with a hydrogen from the next carbon atom are removed, forming a double bond which then has oxidative cross-linking properties and yields the drying oil. It is considered a vital raw material.

=== Chemical precursor ===
Castor oil can react with other materials to produce other chemical compounds that have numerous applications. Transesterification followed by steam cracking gives undecylenic acid, a precursor to specialized polymer nylon 11, and heptanal, a component in fragrances. Breakdown of castor oil in strong base gives 2-octanol, both a fragrance component and a specialized solvent, and the dicarboxylic acid sebacic acid. Hydrogenation of castor oil saturates the alkenes, giving a waxy lubricant. Castor oil may be epoxidized by reacting the OH groups with epichlorohydrin to make the triglycidyl ether of castor oil which is useful in epoxy technology. This is available commercially as Heloxy 505.

The production of lithium grease consumes a significant amount of castor oil. Hydrogenation of castor oil yields 12-hydroxystearic acid, a precursor to lithium 12-hydroxystearate, a thickener in lubricating greases.

Since it has a relatively high dielectric constant (4.7), highly refined and dried castor oil is sometimes used as a dielectric fluid within high-performance, high-voltage capacitors.

=== Lubrication ===
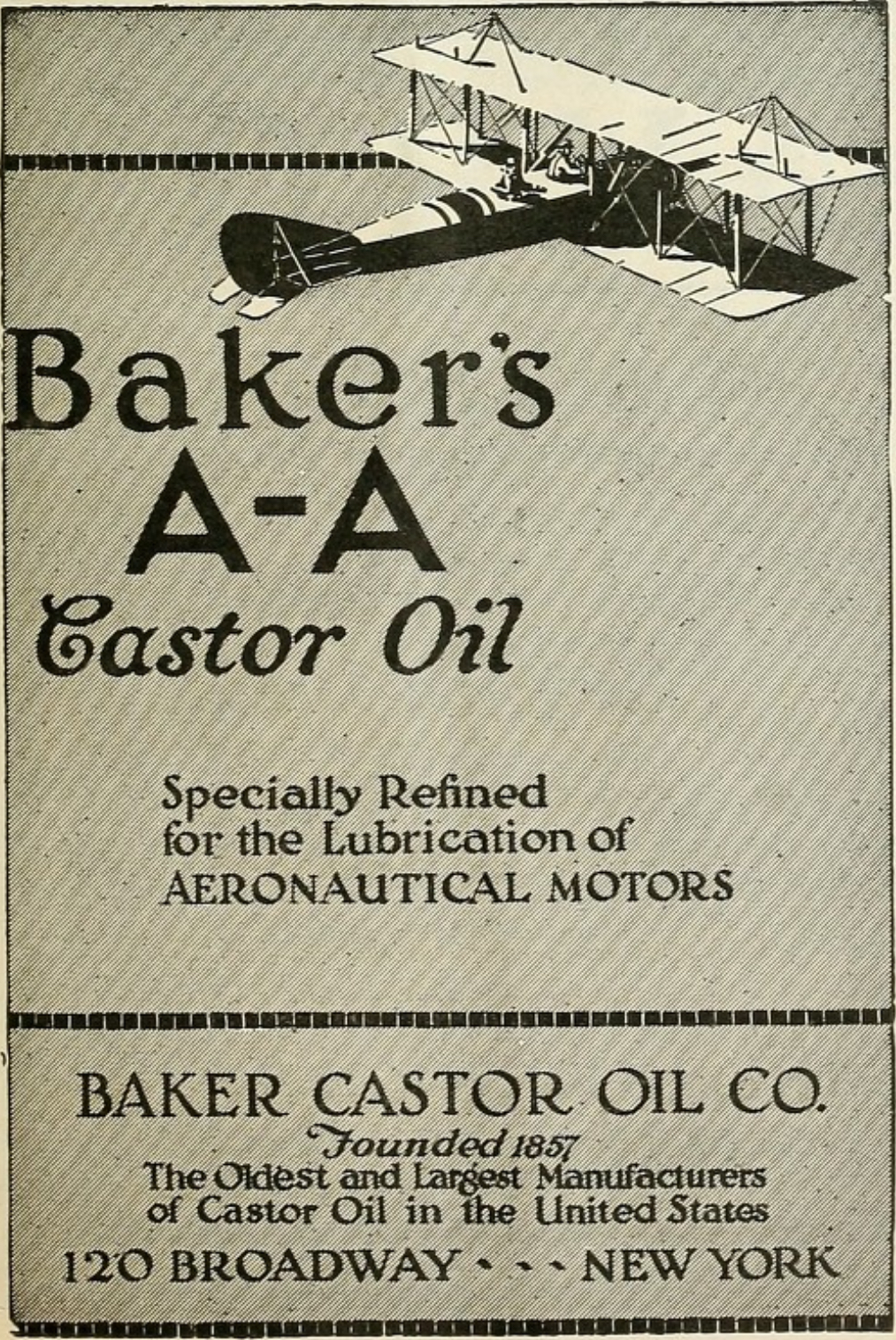
Castor oil advertisement from The Aerial Age Weekly in 1921

Vegetable oils such as castor oil are typically unattractive alternatives to petroleum-derived lubricants because of their poor oxidative stability. Castor oil has better low-temperature viscosity properties and high-temperature lubrication than most vegetable oils, making it useful as a lubricant in jet, diesel, and racing engines. The viscosity of castor oil at 10 °C (50 °F) is 2,420 centipoise, but it tends to form gums in a short time, so its usefulness is limited to engines that are regularly rebuilt, such as racing engines. Lubricant company Castrol took its name from castor oil.

Castor oil has been suggested as a lubricant for bicycle pumps because it does not degrade natural rubber seals.

==== Turkey red oil ====
Turkey red oil, also called sulphonated (or sulfated) castor oil, is made by adding sulfuric acid to vegetable oils, most notably castor oil. It was the first synthetic detergent after ordinary soap. It is used in formulating lubricants, softeners, and dyeing assistants.

==== Biodiesel ====
Castor oil, like currently less expensive vegetable oils, can be used as feedstock in the production of biodiesel. The resulting fuel is superior for cold winters, because of its exceptionally low cloud point and pour point.

Initiatives to grow more castor for energy production, in preference to other oil crops, are motivated by social considerations. Tropical subsistence farmers would gain a cash crop.

=== Early aviation and aeromodelling ===
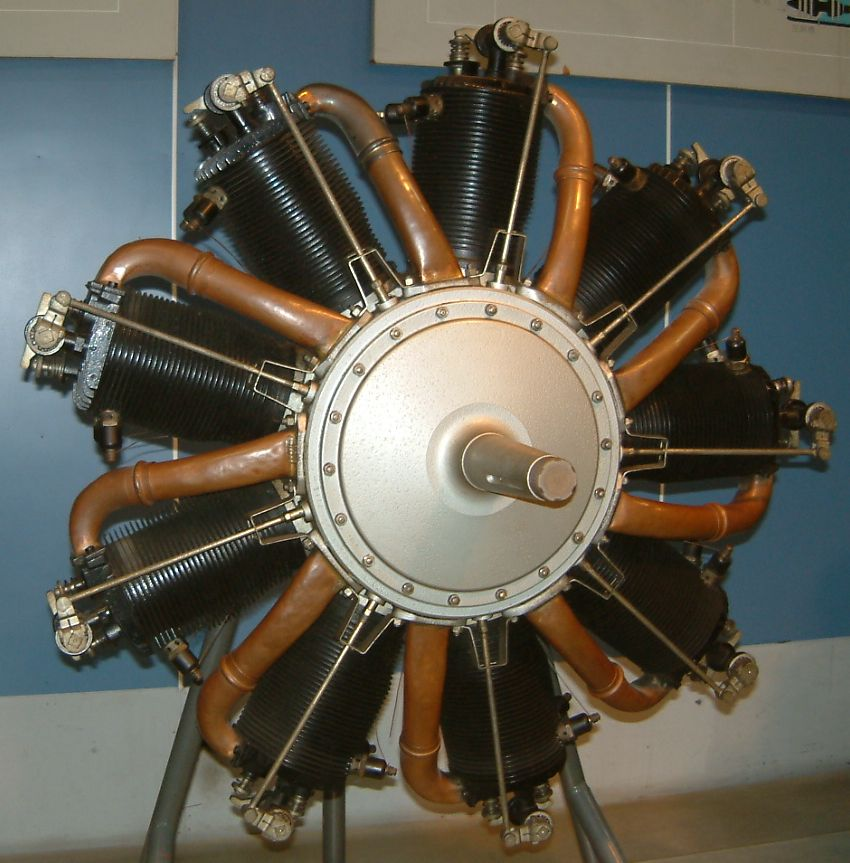
World War I aviation rotary engines used castor oil as a primary lubricant, mixed with the fuel.

Castor oil was the preferred lubricant for rotary engines, such as the Gnome engine after that engine's widespread adoption for aviation in Europe in 1909. It was used almost universally in rotary-engined Allied aircraft in World War I. Germany had to make do with inferior ersatz oil for its rotary engines, which resulted in poor reliability.

The methanol-fueled, two-cycle, glow-plug engines used for aeromodelling, since their adoption by model airplane hobbyists in the 1940s, have used varying percentages of castor oil as lubricants. It is highly resistant to degradation when the engine has its fuel-air mixture leaned for maximum engine speed. Gummy residues can still be a problem for aeromodelling powerplants lubricated with castor oil, however, usually requiring eventual replacement of ball bearings when the residue accumulates within the engine's bearing races. One British manufacturer of sleeve valved four-cycle model engines has stated the "varnish" created by using castor oil in small percentages can improve the pneumatic seal of the sleeve valve, improving such an engine's performance over time.

Castor oil is still occasionally used by aeromodellers in custom fuel mixtures for methanol-burning model engines, due to Castor oil's miscibility in methanol. Typical petroleum-derived two-stroke oils designed for gasoline engines are immiscible in methanol. Castor oil is a readily available alternative to PAG (Polyalkylene Glycol) or other specialty oils for mixing affordable glow fuel (commonly referred to as "nitro fuel" by aeromodelling hobbyists). Depending on the target engine, glow fuel consists of 8-22% oil, 0-30% nitromethane (to improve combustion), and the remainder methanol. Most two-stroke model airplane glow engines can be operated with a fuel mixture of 70% methanol, 15% nitromethane, and 15% castor oil, by volume.

== Safety ==
The castor seed contains ricin, a toxic lectin. Heating during the oil extraction process denatures and deactivates the lectin. Harvesting castor beans, though, may not be without risk. The International Castor Oil Association states that castor beans contain a potentially allergenic compound, CB1A, which can affect people with hypersensitivity. The allergen may be neutralized by treatment with a variety of alkaline agents, and is not present in the castor oil itself.

== See also ==
- Botanol, a flooring material derived from castor oil
- Castor wax
- List of unproven and disproven cancer treatments
