= Acrydite =

Acrydite

Acrydite is a phosphoramidite that allows the synthesis of oligonucleotides with a methacryl group at the 5' end (less commonly 3' or internal). Acryl oligonucleotides have been tested, but the acrylyl group is not stable to storage. Acrydite-modified oligonucleotides can react with nucleophiles such as thiols (Michael addition chemistry), this forms the basis of the ez-rays chemistry which was used for microarrays. More importantly, Acrydite-modified oligonucleotides can be incorporated, stoichiometrically, into hydrogels such as polyacrylamide, using standard free radical polymerization chemistry, where the double bond in the Acrydite group reacts with other activated double bond containing compounds such as acrylamide.

== History ==
The idea of acrylamide-modified DNA was developed by T. Christian Boles, while working at Mosaic Technologies, a now-defunct biotechnology company located in Waltham, MA. The IP was licensed, along with a microarray technology ("ez-rays") to Matrix Technologies, of Hudson, NH, which is now part of Thermo Scientific. Acrydite-modified oligonucleotides can be obtained from vendors such as Integrated DNA Technologies (IDT).

== Hybrigel ==
The first use of Acrydite was in a technology called Hybrigel. In Hybrigel, Acrydite-modified oligos are incorporated into a standard polyacrylamide gel system; as complementary ss nucleic acid moves past the immobilized Acrydite oligos, the complementary DNA is captured. Hybrigel-like technology is widely used as a DNA purification system, as in a DNA sequencing technology developed at Berkeley. Acrydite technology can also be used to purify DNA, as in the Pre-gen colon cancer test developed by Exact Sciences.

== Polonys ==
Mitra and Church at Harvard Medical School developed a novel DNA sequencing technology based on Acrydite-modified probes; this technology is used by Agencourt.

== Acrydite and PCR ==
Surprisingly, the Acrydite group survives PCR, so Acrydite-modified PCR products can be prepared and used as oligos. However, as is common with polymers that are longer than the persistence length, the coupling of Acrydite-modified PCR products is inefficient, as the ends of the molecules are not accessible.

== Acrydite and Protein ==
Acrydite-modified oligonucleotides have been used to study protein DNA interactions

== Acrydite and aptamer-functionalized molecularly imprinted polymers ==
Acrydite-modified aptamers (and also aptamers containing internal acrylamide modifications) have been used to make AptaMIPs, molecularly imprinted polymers that use polymerizable aptamers as monomers for the imprinting. AptaMIPs show enhanced target-binding properties relative to traditional MIPs.

== Acrydite and DNA Computing ==
Experiments by Braich et al. solving the Satisfiability Problem have demonstrated that Acrydite can be used in DNA computing to implement the extraction operation. Previously, a biotin–avidin magnetic bead system was used for this purpose.
