= Coconut timber =

Wood from coconut palm trees

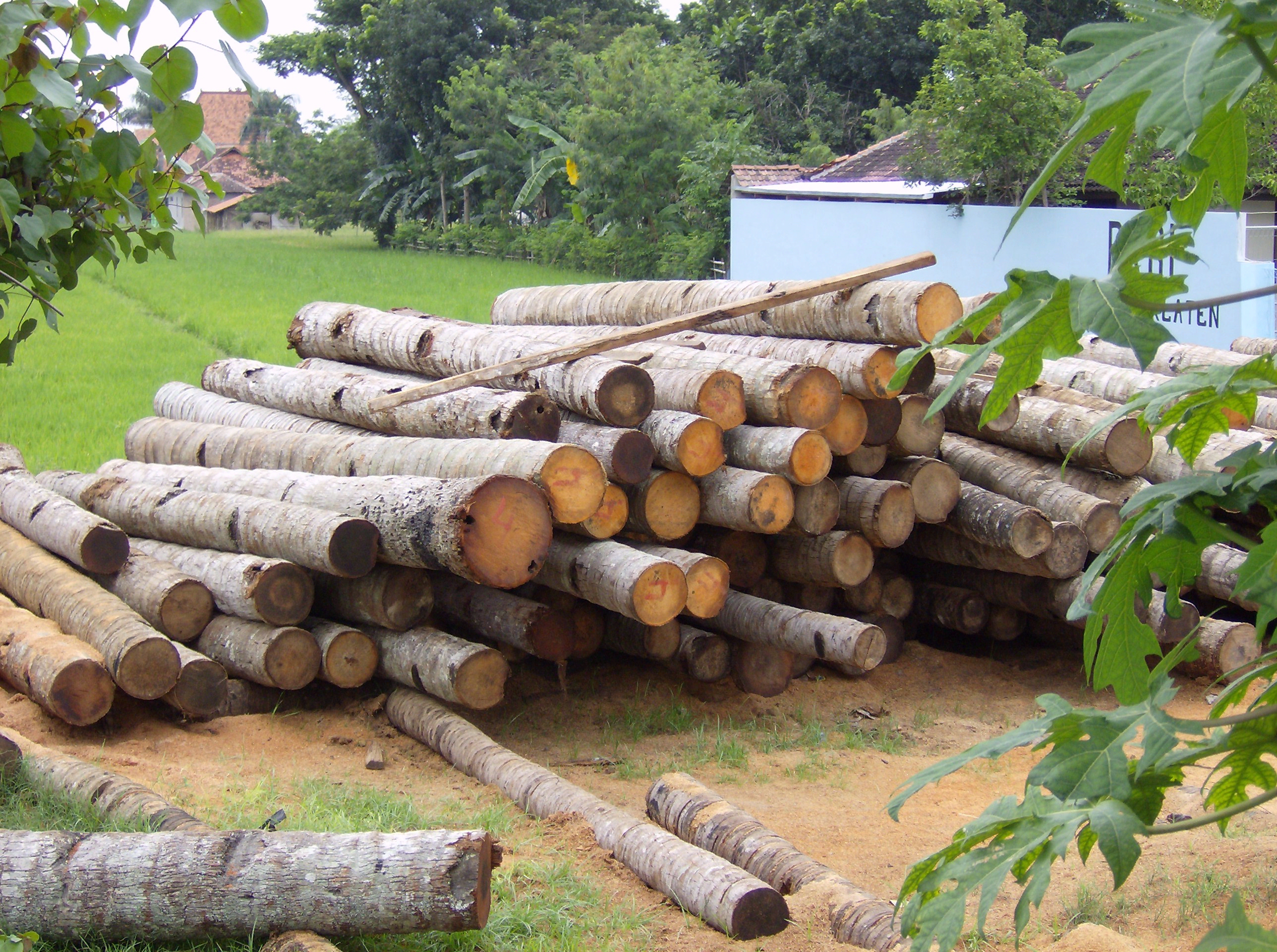
Coconut logs in Klaten, Java, Indonesia

Coconut timber is a hardwood-substitute from coconut palm trees. It is referred to in the Philippines as coconut lumber, or coco lumber, and elsewhere additionally as cocowood or red palm. It is a new timber resource that comes from plantation crops and offers an alternative to rainforest timber.

== Background ==
Coconut timber comes from farmed plantations of old coconut palms. The coconut palm was planted as a crop in large plantations throughout the tropics in the early half of the 20th century in order to harvest the coconut fruit. The tree bears fruit until approximately 70 years of age, at which point it is considered to have reached the end of its economic life and is felled to make way for future crops. Each year, several million palms are felled throughout the tropics. Traditionally, the trunks have been wasted by-products from this process.

Only in very recent years have people begun to explore the potential commercial uses for this vast, alternative supply of timber. This led to the commercial launch of coconut timber in a range of different products, from flooring to posts to furniture. With these products performing at equal to or even better than conventional hardwoods, coconut timber represents a viable substitute for endangered hardwoods from an ecologically-sound source.

== Characteristics ==
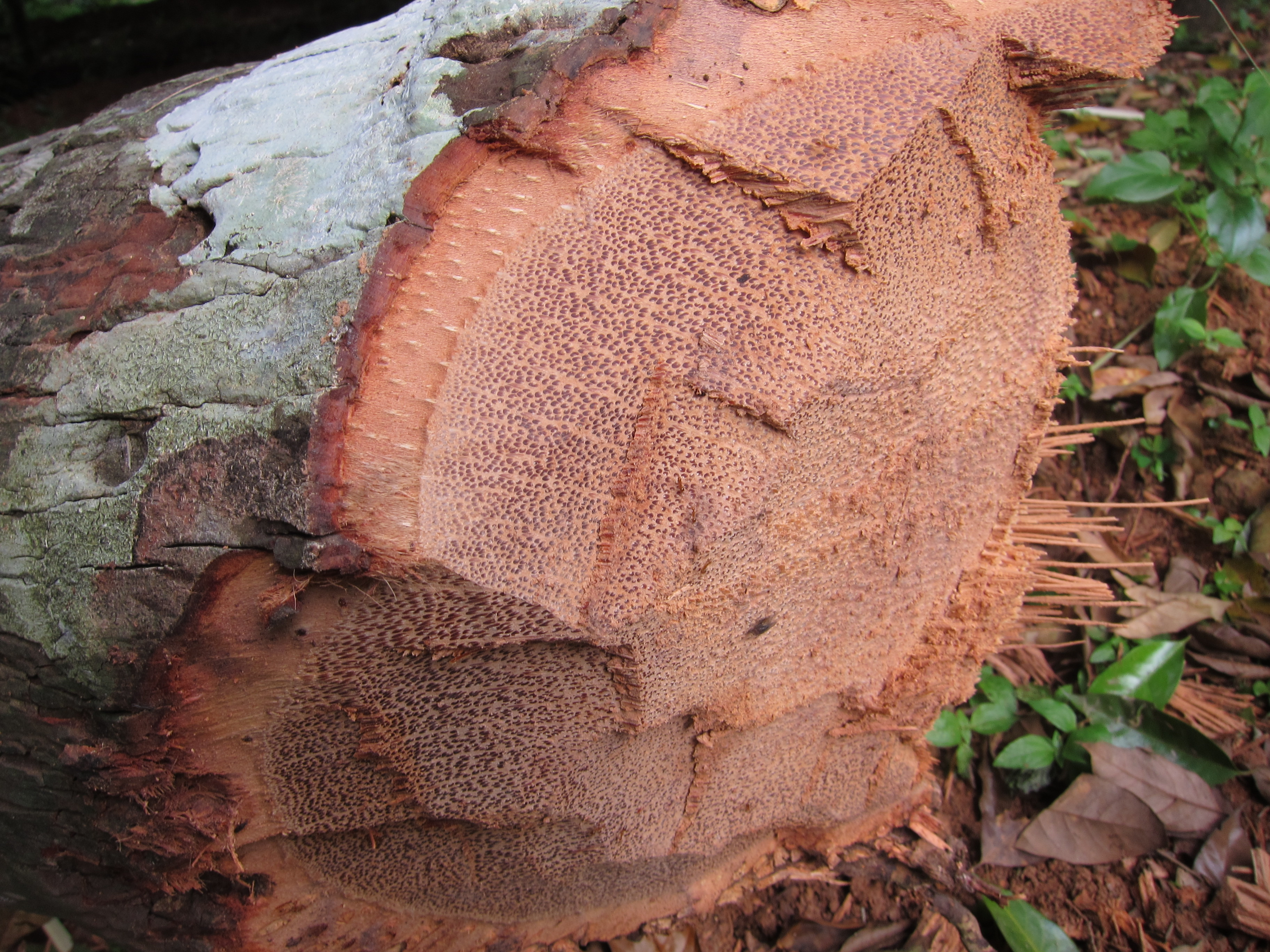
Coconut trunk, showing typical grain of coconut wood

Its wood is reminiscent in appearance to mahogany; however, coconut timber has a much more fibrous grain than mahogany and lacks mahogany's iridescence. Colour tones and hues range from golden to near ebony, with dark brown flecks. There are three basic colour divisions relating to the timber's density: dark brown tones (high density); medium brown tones (medium density); and light golden tones (low density).

Coconut trees have no annual growth rings, rays, heartwood or branches, meaning that coconut timber is free from knots and other such imperfections.

== Properties ==
The coconut palm is a monocotyledon. It has a smooth, slender stem that grows to a height of about 25 metres and with an average diameter of 300 mm. The hardest, densest part of the wood is found on the outer perimeter of the trunk, which gives the tree its strength, while the wood's high silica content gives the tree elasticity. Towards the centre of the trunk, the wood gets less hard. The wood has a Janka ball hardness of 112.5 - 154.7 kgf/cm^{2} (1600 – 2200 psi), which is greater than that of oak (70.3 - 84.4 kgf/cm^{2}) and Douglas fir (35.9 kgf/cm^{2}).

Coconut timber is classified according to three degrees of density:

- High-density timber (dermal) – hard: 600–900 kg/m^{3}
- Medium-density timber (sub-dermal) – medium/hard: 400–600 kg/m^{3}
- Low-density timber (core) – soft/medium: 200–400 kg/m^{3}

== Uses ==
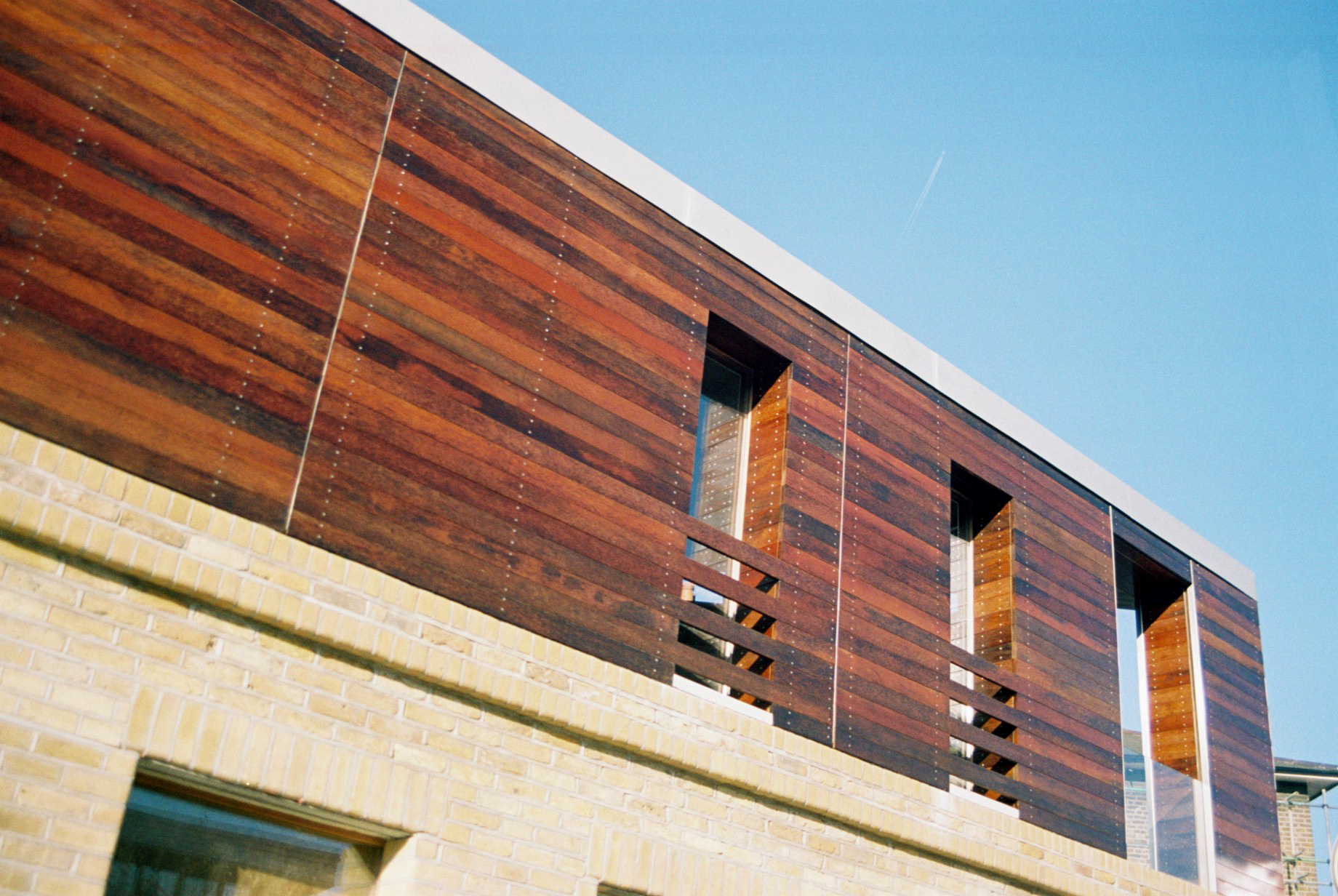
Coconut timber house in London

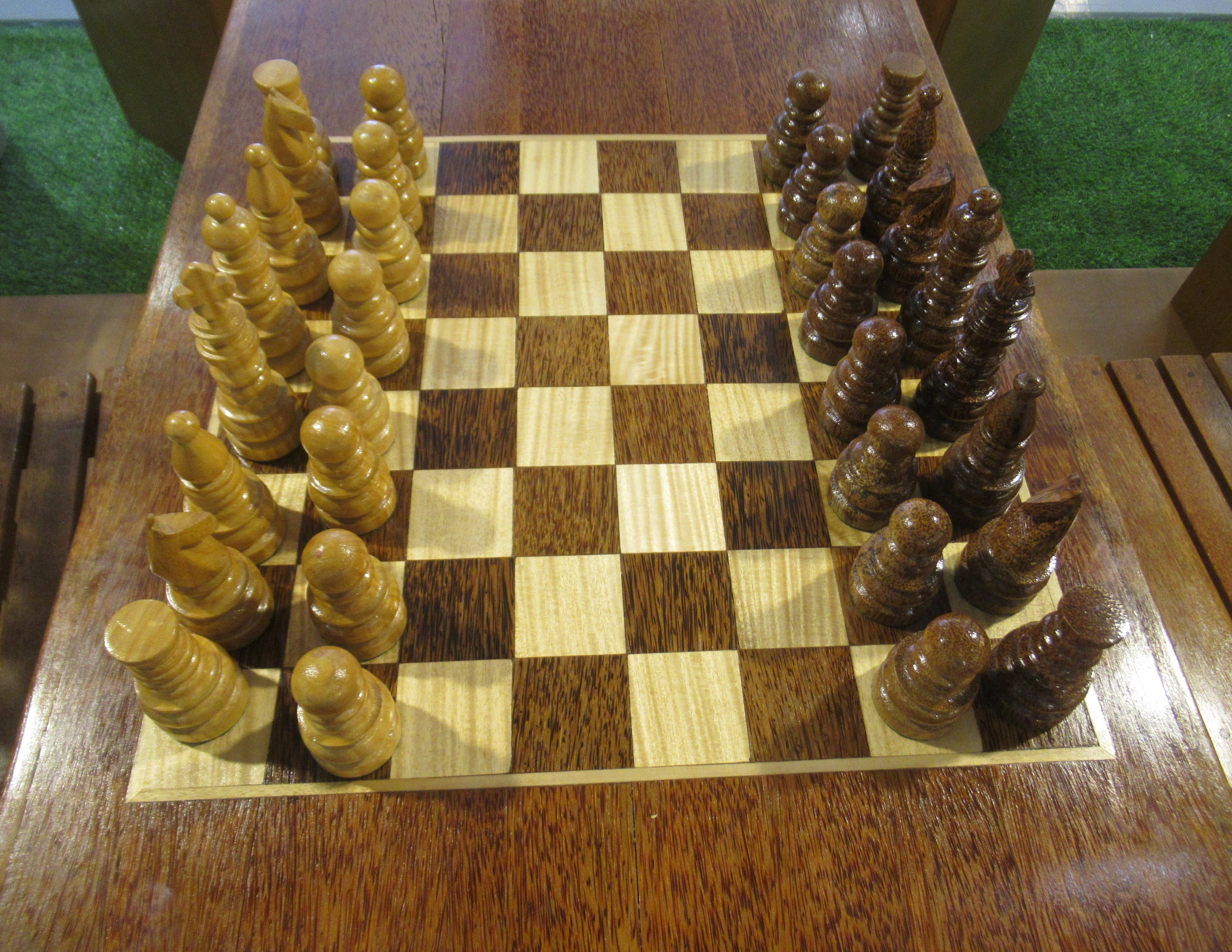
Cocowood chess set (Philippines craft)

Coconut timber has many applications as both a structural and interior design material. The harder, high-density timber is suitable for general structural purposes such as pillars, trusses, rafting, furniture, window and door frames, floors, decking and floor joists. Medium density coconut timber can be used for walls, ceiling joists and horizontal studs. Low density coconut timber is used in non-load bearing applications like wood panelling, internal trim and ceilings, as well as homewares. Coconut timber supplied by Pacific Green is to be used in exterior applications throughout Abu Dhabi's Masdar City development, including the entrance gates, screens and doors.

Chemicals: Activated carbon can also be made from coconut trunk charcoal. The product can be used to manufacture various chemicals such as carbon disulphide, calcium carbide, silicon carbide, carbon monoxide, paint pigments, pharmaceuticals, molding resins, black powder, electrodes, catalyst reactors, brake linings, and gas cylinder absorbent. Ethanol can also be produced from coconut waste products.

== Economic impact ==
Coconut timber is a source of income for less developed South Pacific island communities. The previously low value older coconut trunks have been promoted as a source of veneer and other wood products.

== See also ==
- Coconut timber flooring
- Borassus flabellifer, a harder palm wood known as black palm
