= Botanol =

Synthetic material used as flooring

Botanol is a synthetic material, typically used as a floor covering, made from approximately 90% renewable raw materials including canola oil, castor oil and chalk. Botanol was formulated as an eco-friendly alternative to polyurethane.

== Background ==
Botanol (also called Bioboden in Germany) was developed by German company Windmöller Flooring Products GmbH in 2008, under the umbrella brand, Wineo. Their researchers formulated the material based on polyurethane, a high quality, wear-resistant plastic. They were able to replace the petrochemical polyols typically found in polyurethane with a bio-based polyols made from natural oils to make this material more ecological and healthy. This material does not contain any chlorine, plasticizers or solvents and is odor-neutral.

== Use ==
Botanol was first introduced under the brand name, PURLINE, a line of flooring developed to be an environmentally friendly alternative to vinyl sheet flooring. PURLINE is a flexible, durable, resilient floor covering with a backing. This flooring is appropriate for commercial and residential applications. Unique designs are integrated in the manufacturing stage, creating fake woods and stones in addition to giving clients creative freedom to design their own logo or motif. It is offered in a roll and plank format making it versatile and easy to install in large and small spaces.
