= Glycidamide =

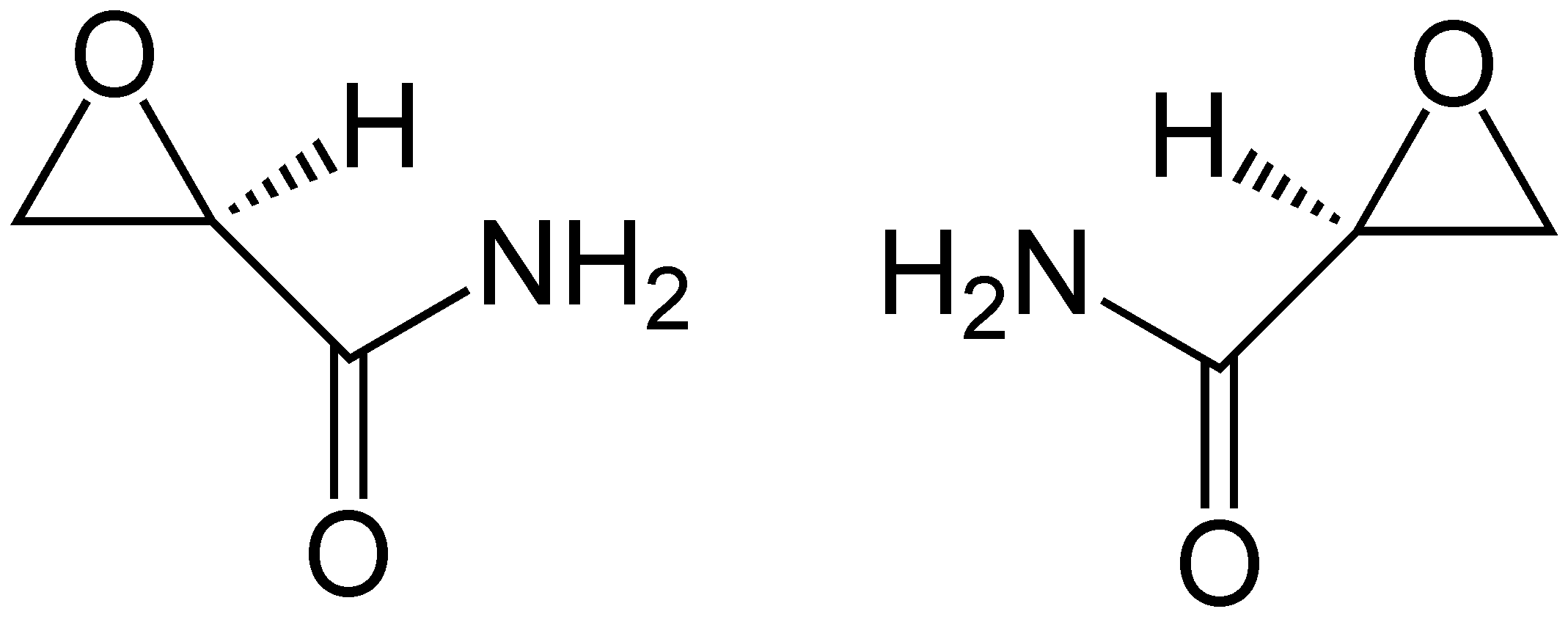

Names
- Preferred IUPAC name Oxiranecarboxamide
- Other names Glycidic acid amide Oxirane-2-carboxamide

Identifiers
CAS Number	5694-00-8
3D model (JSmol)	Interactive image
ChemSpider	82664
ECHA InfoCard	100.024.694
PubChem CID	91550
UNII	6G5ELX5XYN
CompTox Dashboard (EPA)	DTXSID2031374
- InChI: InChI=1S/C3H5NO2/c4-3(5)2-1-6-2/h2H,1H2,(H2,4,5)
- SMILES: C1C(O1)C(=O)N

Properties
Chemical formula	C_{3}H_{5}NO_{2}
Molar mass	87.078 g·mol^{−1}
Density	1.404 g/cm^{3}
Melting point	32–34 °C (90–93 °F; 305–307 K)

Pharmacology
- Pharmacokinetics
Biological half-life	5 hours
- Except where otherwise noted, data are given for materials in their standard state (at 25 °C [77 °F], 100 kPa). Infobox references

Glycidamide is an organic compound with the formula H_{2}NC(O)C_{2}H_{3}O. It is a colorless oil. Structurally, it contains adjacent amide and epoxide functional groups. It is a bioactive, potentially toxic or even carcinogenic metabolite of acrylonitrile and acrylamide. It is a chiral molecule.

== Structure and reactivity ==
Glycidamide is a reactive epoxide metabolite from acrylamide and can react with nucleophiles. This results in covalent binding of the electrophile.

Glycidamide gives a positive response in the Ames/Salmonella mutagenicity assay, which indicates that it can cause mutations in the DNA. However, "Epidemiologic studies of workers for possible health effects from exposures to acrylamide have not shown a consistent increase in cancer risk."

== Formation ==
Early studies showed that glycidamides can be synthesized by the action of hydrogen peroxide on acrylonitrile derivatives.

More relevant to health concerns, glycidamide forms from acrylamide. The acrylamide is generated by pyrolysis of proteins rich in asparagine. Oxidation of acrylamide, catalyzed by the enzyme cytochrome P450 2E1 (CYP2E1) gives glycidamide. Saturated fatty acids protect the acrylamide from forming glycidamide. When during food processing, oil is used that contains unsaturated fatty acids, the amount of glycidamide formed is much higher.

== Pathology ==
=== Reactions ===
Glycidamide reacts with DNA to form adducts. It is more reactive toward DNA than acrylamide. Several glycidamide-DNA adducts have been characterized. The main DNA adducts are N^{7}-(2-carbamoyl-2-hydroxyethyl)-guanine (or N^{7}-GA-Gua) and N^{3}-(2-carbamoyl-2-hydroxyethyl)adenine (or N^{3}-GA-Ade). Glycidamide also reacts with haemoglobin (Hb) to form a cysteine adduct, S-(2-hydroxy-2-carboxyethyl)cysteine. With this reaction, N-terminal valine adducts are also formed.

=== Mechanism of action ===
According to a major review, acrylamide "is extensively metabolized, mostly by conjugation with glutathione but also by epoxidation to glycidamide (GA). Formation of GA is considered to represent the route underlying the genotoxicity and carcinogenicity of acrylamide. The reaction of glycidamide and glutathione represents a detoxification pathway."

Glycidamide inhibits the sodium/potassium ATPase protein present in the plasma membrane of nerve cells. Intracellular sodium increases and intracellular potassium decreases due to this inhibition. This causes depolarization of the nerve membrane. The depolarization triggers a reverse sodium/calcium exchange, which will cause calcium-mediated axon degeneration.

=== Metabolism ===
The liver is a very active organ in the metabolism of xenobiotics. Substances in the liver modify the compounds to make them more soluble in water, in order to excrete them through bile and urine. In the case of acrylamide, this metabolic strategy result in a greater toxicity of the compound. Whether this is the case for glycidamide remains unclear.

Glycidamide can be detoxified through diverse pathways such as the formation of glycidamide-glutathione conjugates. Both an enzymatic pathway via glutathione S-transferase and a non-enzymatic pathway exist. These glycidamide-glutathione conjugates are further metabolized to mercapturic acids by various peptidases and transferases, such as gamma-glutamyl-transpeptidase, dipeptidases, and N-acetyltransferase. The mercapturic acids that can be formed are N-acetyl-S-(2-carbamoylethyl)-cysteine (AAMA), N-acetyl-S-(1-carbamoyl-2-hydroxyethyl)-cysteine (GAMA2), and N-acetyl-S-(2-carbamoyl-2-hydroxyethyl)-cysteine (GAMA3) (Huang et al., 2011). These mercapturic acids are excreted through urine.

Glycidamide can also be hydrolyzed to glyceramide both spontaneously or enzymatically by microsomal epoxide hydrolase. This too can be excreted through urine.

=== Animal studies ===
Mice and rats show mutations and DNA adducts consistent with those arising from glycidamide. Another study found tumors in the mice bodies after treatment with glycidamide A study by National Toxicology Program (2014) provided evidence of carcinogenic activity of glycidamide in several species of rats and mice. For two years, rats and mice were exposed to varying doses of glycidamide in drinking water. In the rats and mice were several carcinogenic effects found, such as carcinomas, fibroadenomas and malignant mesotheliomas.
