= Glycidol =

- Glycidol

Names
- Preferred IUPAC name Oxiranylmethanol
- Other names Glycidol; 2,3-Epoxy-1-propanol; 3-Hydroxypropylene oxide Epoxypropyl alcohol Hydroxymethyl ethylene oxide 2-Hydroxymethyl oxirane

Identifiers
CAS Number	556-52-5
3D model (JSmol)	Interactive image
ChEBI	CHEBI:30966
ChemSpider	10691
ECHA InfoCard	100.008.300
KEGG	C10920
PubChem CID	11164
UNII	S54CF1DV9A
CompTox Dashboard (EPA)	DTXSID4020666
- InChI: InChI=1S/C3H6O2/c4-1-3-2-5-3/h3-4H,1-2H2 Key: CTKINSOISVBQLD-UHFFFAOYSA-N; InChI=1/C3H6O2/c4-1-3-2-5-3/h3-4H,1-2H2 Key: CTKINSOISVBQLD-UHFFFAOYAN
- SMILES: OCC1OC1

Properties
Chemical formula	C_{3}H_{6}O_{2}
Molar mass	74.079 g·mol^{−1}
Appearance	Viscous liquid
Density	1.1143 g/cm^{3}
Melting point	−54 °C (−65 °F; 219 K)
Boiling point	167 °C (333 °F; 440 K) (decomposes)
Solubility in water	miscible
Vapor pressure	0.9 mmHg (25°C)

Hazards
NFPA 704 (fire diamond)	4 2 3
Flash point	66 °C (151 °F; 339 K)
- Lethal dose or concentration (LD, LC)
LD_{50} (median dose)	420 mg/kg (oral, rat); 1980 mg/kg (dermal, rabbit)
LC_{50} (median concentration)	450 ppm (mouse, 4 hr); 580 ppm (rat, 8 hr)
- NIOSH (US health exposure limits)
PEL (Permissible)	TWA 50 ppm (150 mg/m^{3})
REL (Recommended)	TWA 25 ppm (75 mg/m^{3})
IDLH (Immediate danger)	150 ppm
Safety data sheet (SDS)	External MSDS
- Except where otherwise noted, data are given for materials in their standard state (at 25 °C [77 °F], 100 kPa). verify (what is ?) Infobox references

Glycidol is an organic compound with the formula HOCH_{2}CHOCH_{2}. The molecule contains both epoxide and alcohol functional groups. Being simple to make and bifunctional, it has a variety of industrial uses. The compound is a colorless, slightly viscous liquid that is slightly unstable and is not often encountered in pure form.

== Synthesis and applications ==
Glycidol is prepared by the epoxidation of allyl alcohol. A typical catalyst is tungstic acid, and a typical O-atom source is aqueous peroxyacetic acid. Glycidol has also been prepared by dehydrohalogenation of 3-chloro-1,2-propanediol using bipolar membrane electrodialysis. The hydroxide ions generated in situ at the bipolar membrane promote cyclization of the chlorinated diol to glycidol; complete conversion of 3-chloro-1,2-propanediol and a glycidol yield of 75.6% have been reported.

Some useful products derived from glycidol are 2,3-epoxypropyloxy chloroformate (from phosgene) and glycidyl urethanes (by addition of isocyanates):

HOCH_{2}CH(O)CH_{2} + COCl_{2} → ClC(O)OCH_{2}CH(O)CH_{2} + HCl
HOCH_{2}CH(O)CH_{2} + RNCO → RNHC(O)OCH_{2}CH(O)CH_{2}

Glycidol is used as a chemical intermediate in the synthesis of other glycidyl ethers, esters, and amines.

Glycidol can be O-benzylated in the presence of strong base. More typically, such glycidol ethers are produced by reaction of epichlorohydrin with alkoxides.

Glycidol is a precursor to diproqualone (by alkylation of 2-methylquinazolin-4(3H)-one) and dyphylline (by alkylation of theophylline).

=== Occurrence ===
Glycidyl fatty acid esters that are thought to contaminate some edible oils could be a source of traces of glycidol in the diet. These esters are formed during the deodorization step of edible oil refining, which uses vapor and high temperatures to remove impurities. The reaction conditions in that step can allow monoglyceride and diglycerides (MAG, DAG) naturally present in the oil to rearrange into glycidyl fatty acid esters.

== Safety ==
Glycidol is an irritant of the skin, eyes, mucous membranes, and upper respiratory tract. Exposure to glycidol may also cause central nervous system depression, followed by central nervous system stimulation. It is listed as an IARC Group 2A Agent, meaning that it is "probably carcinogenic to humans". In regards to occupational exposures, the Occupational Safety and Health Administration has set a permissible exposure limit at 50 ppm over an eight-hour work shift, while the National Institute for Occupational Safety and Health recommends a limit at 25 ppm over an eight-hour work shift.

== See also ==
- Epichlorohydrin
- Ethylene oxide (also known as oxirane)
- Glycidamide
- Glycidic acid
- Propylene oxide (also known as 2-methyloxirane)
