= Reactive diluent =

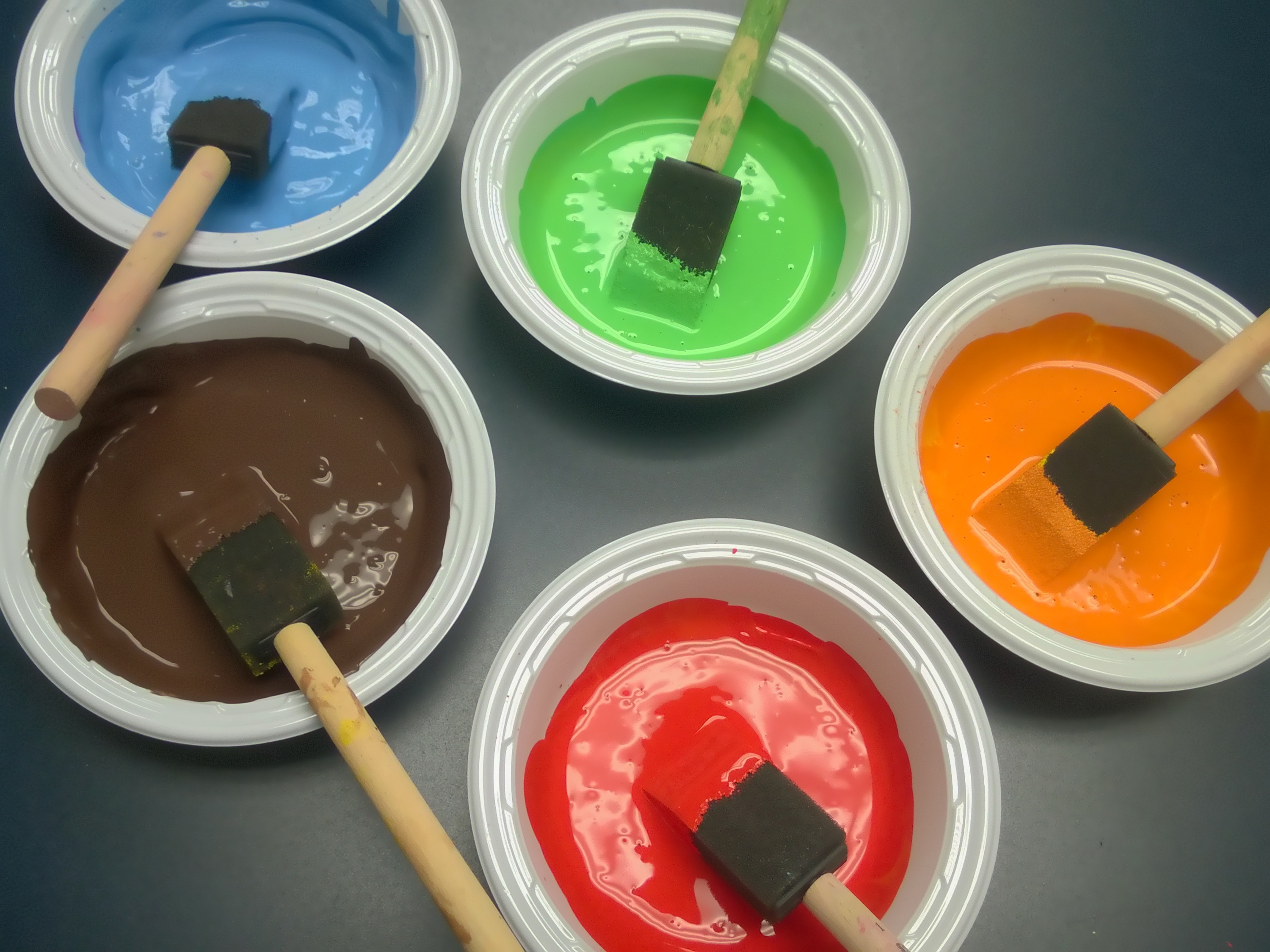
Paints in which a reactive diluent could be used.

Reactive diluents are substances which reduce the viscosity of a lacquer or resin for processing and become part of the lacquer or coating during its subsequent curing via copolymerization. A non-reactive diluent would be a solvent or plasticizer.

Diluents (or thinners) are usually added to lacquers or other resins, to reduce their viscosity and rheology). In thermal cured lacquers, such diluents added are volatile substances which evaporate from the lacquer during drying. In the case of radiation-curing lacquers (for example UV lacquers), those diluents should be avoided. The addition of reactive diluents facilitates the processing of the lacquers, allows the addition of more fillers and improves the wetting behavior on the substrate. If volatile diluents are replaced by reactive diluents, flammability, smell, skin irritation and environmental compatibility (by lower or no VOC emissions) can be improved.

== Choice of reactive diluent ==
Since reactive diluents are incorporated into a lacquer or resin and remain in it, they influence not only the viscosity of the uncured lacquer but also its physical properties after curing. Therefore, the choice of the reactive diluent has an influence on:

- The adhesion of the lacquer to the substrate
- The compatibility with the binder
- The chemistry of the resin (for example an epoxy resin would use an epoxy reactive diluent)
- The flexibility of the cured layer
- The volatility
- The environmental compatibility.

Reactive diluents used are low-viscosity, mono-, bi- or polyfunctional monomers or oligomers. In general, several different monomers are combined so that one monomer can compensate for the undesired properties of another monomer. Monofunctional monomers offer a low viscosity, but are quite volatile and tend to smell. With an increasing number of functional groups of a monomer, its volatility decreases while viscosity and crosslinking of the final varnish increase.

Styrene and acrylates are frequently used as reactive diluents. Epoxides make use of reactive diluents with oxirane functionality.
