= Parsol =

Parsol is the trade name of a number of UV absorbers marketed by DSM-Firmenich:

- Avobenzone (Parsol 1789)
- Bemotrizinol (Parsol Shield)
- Bisoctrizole (Parsol Max)
- Diethylamino hydroxybenzoyl hexyl benzoate (Parsol DHHB)
- Ethylhexyl triazone (Parsol EHT)
- Homosalate (Parsol HMS)
- Polysilicone-15 (Parsol SLX)
- Phenylbenzimidazole sulfonic acid (Parsol HS)
- Octisalate (Parsol EHS)
- Octinoxate (Parsol MCX)
- Octocrylene (Parsol 340)
- 4-methylbenzylidene camphor (Parsol 5000)
