= Uvinul =

Uvinul is the trade name of a number of UV absorbers:

- Diethylamino hydroxybenzoyl hexyl benzoate (Uvinul A Plus)
- Ethylhexyl triazone (Uvinul T 150)
- Oxybenzone (Uvinul M 40)
- Octinoxate (Uvinul MC 80 (N))
- Octocrylene (Uvinul N 539 T)
- PEG-25 PABA (Uvinul P 25)
- Sulisobenzone (Uvinul MS 40)
