= Tinosorb =

Tinosorb is the trade name of a number of UV absorbers marketed by BASF:

- Bemotrizinol (Tinosorb S)
- Bisoctrizole (Tinosorb M)
- Tris-biphenyl triazine (Tinosorb A2B)
- Octyl methoxycinnamate (Tinosorb OMC)
