= Eusolex =

Eusolex is the trade name of a number of UV absorbers:

- Avobenzone (Eusolex 9020)
- Dibenzalhydrazine (Eusolex 6653)
- 4-Methylbenzylidene camphor (Eusolex 6300)
- Octyl methoxycinnamate (Eusolex 2292)
- Oxybenzone (Eusolex 4360)
