= Sunscreen =

Skin product helping to prevent sunburn

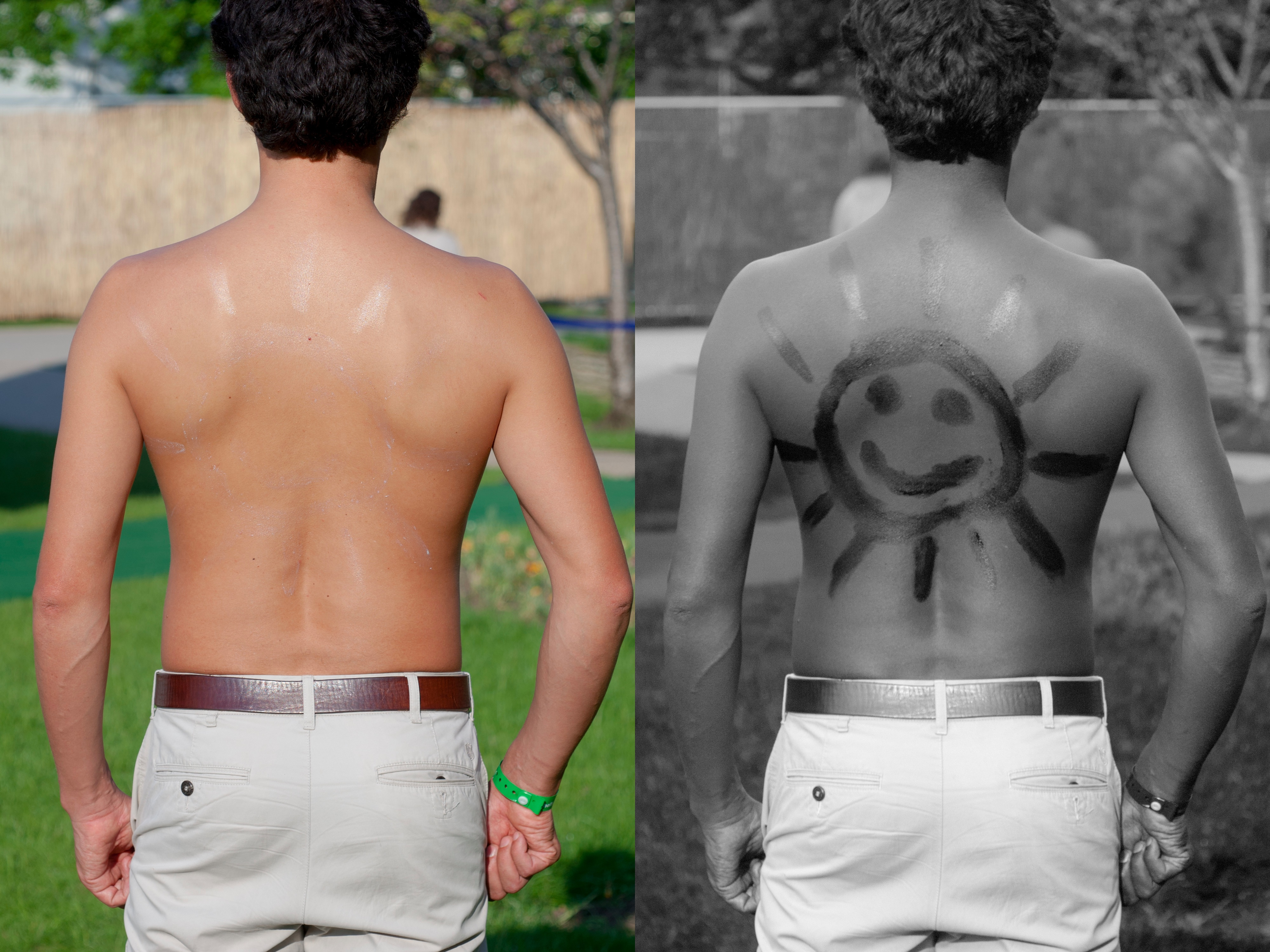
- Sunscreen drawing on skin shown on a normal photo and on a UV-photo
- Other names: Sun screen, sunblock, sunburn cream, sun cream, block out, sun lotion, suncream, suncare lotion

Sunscreen, also known as sunblock, (Note: Sunblock and sunscreen are often used as synonyms. However, the term "sunblock" is controversial and banned in the EU and the United States as it might lead consumers to overestimate the effectiveness of products so labeled.) sun lotion or sun cream, is a photoprotective topical product for the skin that helps protect against sunburn and prevent skin cancer. Sunscreens come as lotions, sprays, gels, foams (such as an expanded foam lotion or whipped lotion), sticks, powders and other topical products. Sunscreens are common supplements to clothing, particularly sunglasses, sunhats and special sun protective clothing, and other forms of photoprotection (such as umbrellas). Sunscreen is on the World Health Organization's List of Essential Medicines.

Sunscreen products may be classified according to the type of active ingredient(s) present in the formulation (inorganic compounds or organic molecules) as:

- Mineral sunscreens (also referred to as physical sunscreens), which use only inorganic compounds (zinc oxide and/or titanium dioxide) as active ingredients. These ingredients primarily work by absorbing UV rays, with some reflection and scattering of UV radiation also occurring.
- Chemical sunscreens (also referred to as organic sunscreens), which use organic molecules as active ingredients. Chemical sunscreen ingredients work by absorbing the UV rays and releasing the heat. Additionally, particulate organic UV filters, such as bisoctrizole, can also reflect and scatter a small portion of incident UV light.
- Hybrid sunscreens, which contain a combination of organic and inorganic UV filters.

Medical organizations such as the American Cancer Society recommend the use of sunscreen because it aids in the prevention of squamous cell carcinomas. The routine use of sunscreens may also reduce the risk of melanoma. To effectively protect against all the potential damages of UV light, the use of broad-spectrum sunscreens (covering both UVA and UVB radiation) has been recommended.

Different active ingredients vary in their effectiveness, safety profiles, and environmental impact; some may cause allergic reactions or harm marine life, although public-health bodies generally consider the benefits of approved sunscreens to outweigh the potential risks.

== History ==
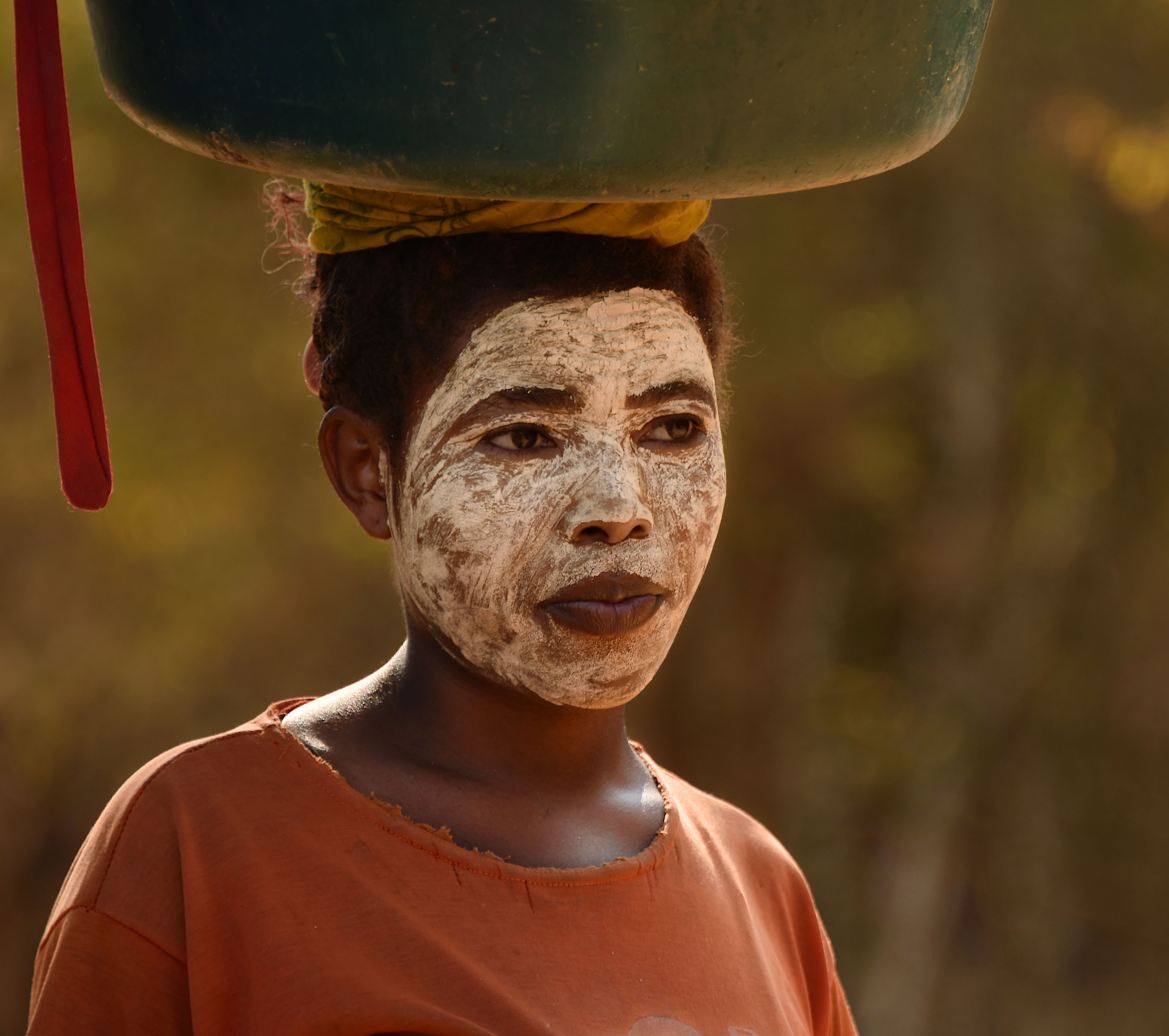
Malagasy woman from Madagascar wearing masonjoany, a traditional sunscreen. Its use dates back to the 18th century.

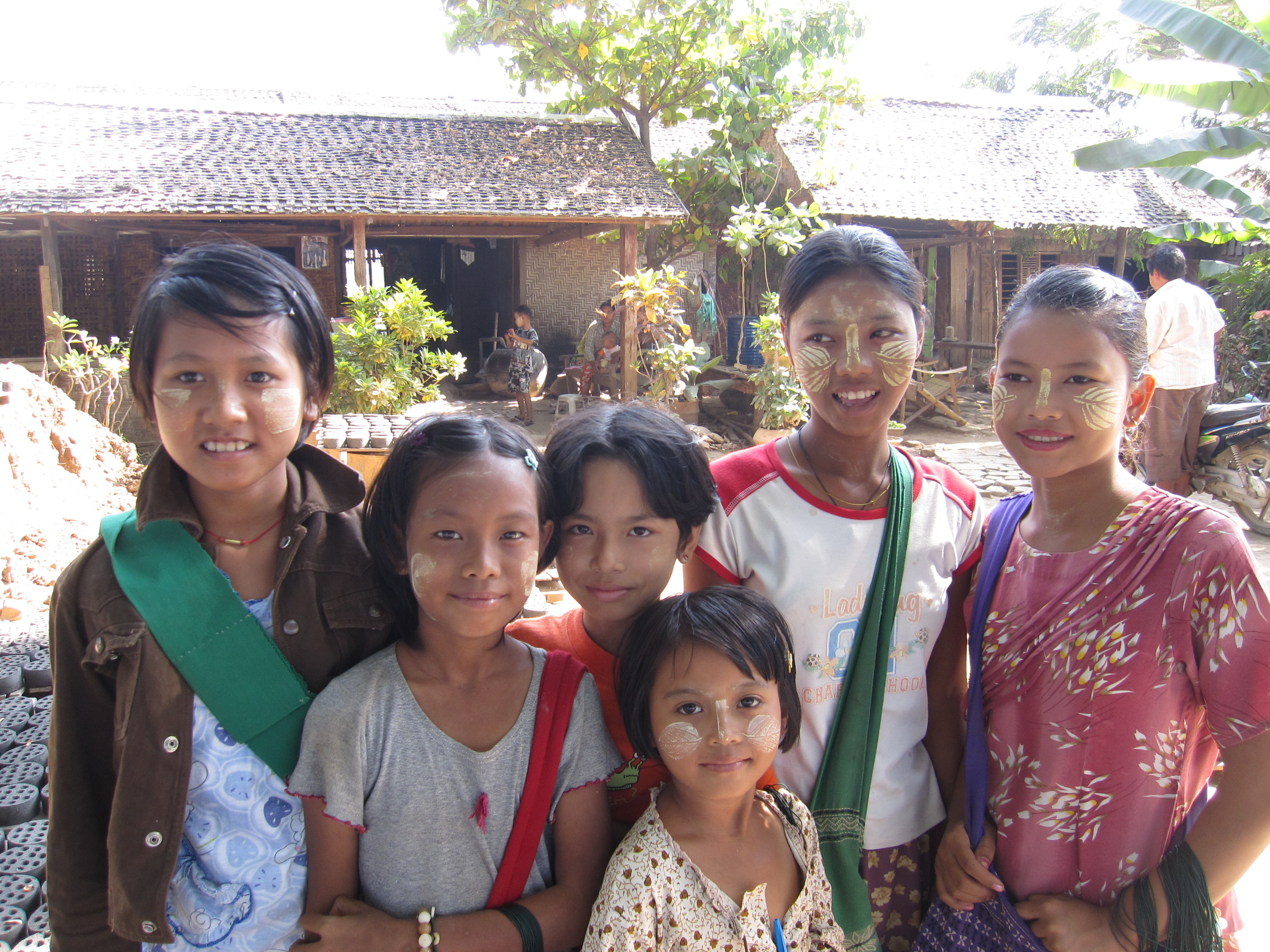
Burmese girls wearing thanaka for sun protection and cosmetic purposes

Early civilizations used a variety of plant products to help protect the skin from sun damage. For example, ancient Greeks used olive oil for this purpose, and ancient Egyptians used extracts of rice, jasmine, and lupine plants whose products are still used in skin care today. Zinc oxide paste has also been popular for skin protection for thousands of years. Among the nomadic sea-going Sama-Bajau people of the Philippines, Malaysia, and Indonesia, a common type of sun protection is a paste called borak or burak, which was made from water weeds, rice, and spices; it is used most commonly by women to protect the face and exposed skin areas from the harsh tropical sun at sea. In Myanmar, thanaka, a yellow-white cosmetic paste made of ground bark, is traditionally used for sun protection. In Madagascar, a ground wood paste called masonjoany has been worn for sun protection, as well as decoration and insect repellent, since the 18th century, and is ubiquitous in the Northwest coastal regions of the island to this day.

In 1820, Sir Everard Home, an English physician, conducted observational experiences that suggested there is something other than heat from the sun that causes sunburns. He also documented the protective effect of having dark skin on sun burns. The link between UV rays and skin burns was established experimentally by Erik Johan Widmark in 1889, which initiated research into substances capable of blocking or absorbing UV radiation for skin protection. The first commercial sunscreen was under the names Zeozon for sunburn prophylaxis and Ultrazeozon against glacier burn from Kopp & Joseph produced with aesculin derivatives. Once Wilhelm Hausser and Wilhelm Vahle had determined the wavelength responsible for sunburn on the skin at 297 nm, all that remained was to find substances that absorb in this specific wavelength range. It was Emil Klarfeld who identified two substances, salicylicacidbenzylester and benzylcinnamic acid ester, that absorb in the requested range. He formulated a product with these two ingredients and the company Lehn & Fink launched the product under the Dorothy Gray brand. This was followed by the first sunscreen, invented in Australia by chemist H.A. Milton Blake, in 1932 formulating with the UV filter tannic acid at a concentration of 10%. Its protection was verified by the University of Adelaide. Research into new products continued unabated in the 1930s. In Germany, the physicist Erich Merkel (1886-1974) and his colleague Christian Wiegand (1901-1978), a chemist, wanted to find out whether it was possible to form pigment on human skin through solar radiation without sunburn. They thought that a substance that absorbs between 320 nm and 290 nm should prevent the skin from reddening but allow the tanning rays to pass through. Merkel and Wiegand worked at IG Farben in the physics laboratory in Elberfeld. Merkel tested the first filter substances identified by Wiegand in practice. He climbed Corvatsch and the Jungfraujoch to do this. The experiments were encouraging. Now the researchers tested their further developments on female employees in the laboratory. They stuck jars of the substances on their backs, forearms, or thighs and measured the effect; novantisolic acid turned out to be the best candidate. The substance was patented as a sunscreen protection agent in Germany in 1933 and a year later in the United States. IG Farben founded a subsidiary, Drugofa, with the aim of launching a product with the active ingredient on the market under the name Delial. In 1936, L'Oreal released its first sunscreen product, formulated by French chemist Eugène Schueller.

The US military was an early adopter of sunscreen. In 1944, as the hazards of sun overexposure became apparent to soldiers stationed in the Pacific tropics at the height of World War II, Benjamin Green, an airman and later a pharmacist, produced Red Vet Pet (for Red Veterinary Petrolatum) for the US military. Sales boomed when Coppertone improved and commercialized the substance under the Coppertone girl and Bain de Soleil branding in the early 1950s. In 1946, Austrian chemist Franz Greiter introduced a product, called Gletscher Crème (Glacier Cream), subsequently became the basis for the company Piz Buin, named in honor of the mountain where Greiter allegedly received the sunburn.

In 1974, Greiter adapted earlier calculations from Friedrich Ellinger and Rudolf Schulze and introduced the "sun protection factor" (SPF), which has become the global standard for measuring UVB protection. It has been estimated that Gletscher Crème had an SPF of 2.

Water-resistant sunscreens were introduced in 1977, and recent development efforts have focused on overcoming later concerns by making sunscreen protection both longer-lasting and broader-spectrum (protection from both UVA & UVB rays), more environmentally friendly, more appealing to use, and evaluating the safety profiles of organic UV filters following FDA studies that demonstrated systemic absorption into the bloodstream (which prompted requests for further safety data, though the FDA has not concluded these ingredients are unsafe).

== Health effects ==
=== Benefits ===
Sunscreen use can help prevent melanoma and squamous cell carcinoma, two types of skin cancer. There is little evidence that it is effective in preventing basal cell carcinoma. In 2025, sunscreen was added to the WHO list of essential medicines to prevent skin damage and skin cancer in people with albinism.

A 2013 study concluded that the diligent, everyday application of sunscreen could slow or temporarily prevent the development of wrinkles and sagging skin. The study involved 900 white people in Australia and required some of them to apply a broad-spectrum sunscreen every day for four and a half years. It found that people who did so had noticeably more resilient and smoother skin than those assigned to continue their usual practices. A study on 32 subjects showed that daily use of sunscreen (SPF 30) reversed photoaging of the skin within 12 weeks and the amelioration continued until the end of the investigation period of one year. Sunscreen is inherently anti-aging as the sun is the number-one cause of premature aging; it therefore may slow or temporarily prevent the development of wrinkles, dark spots, and sagging skin.

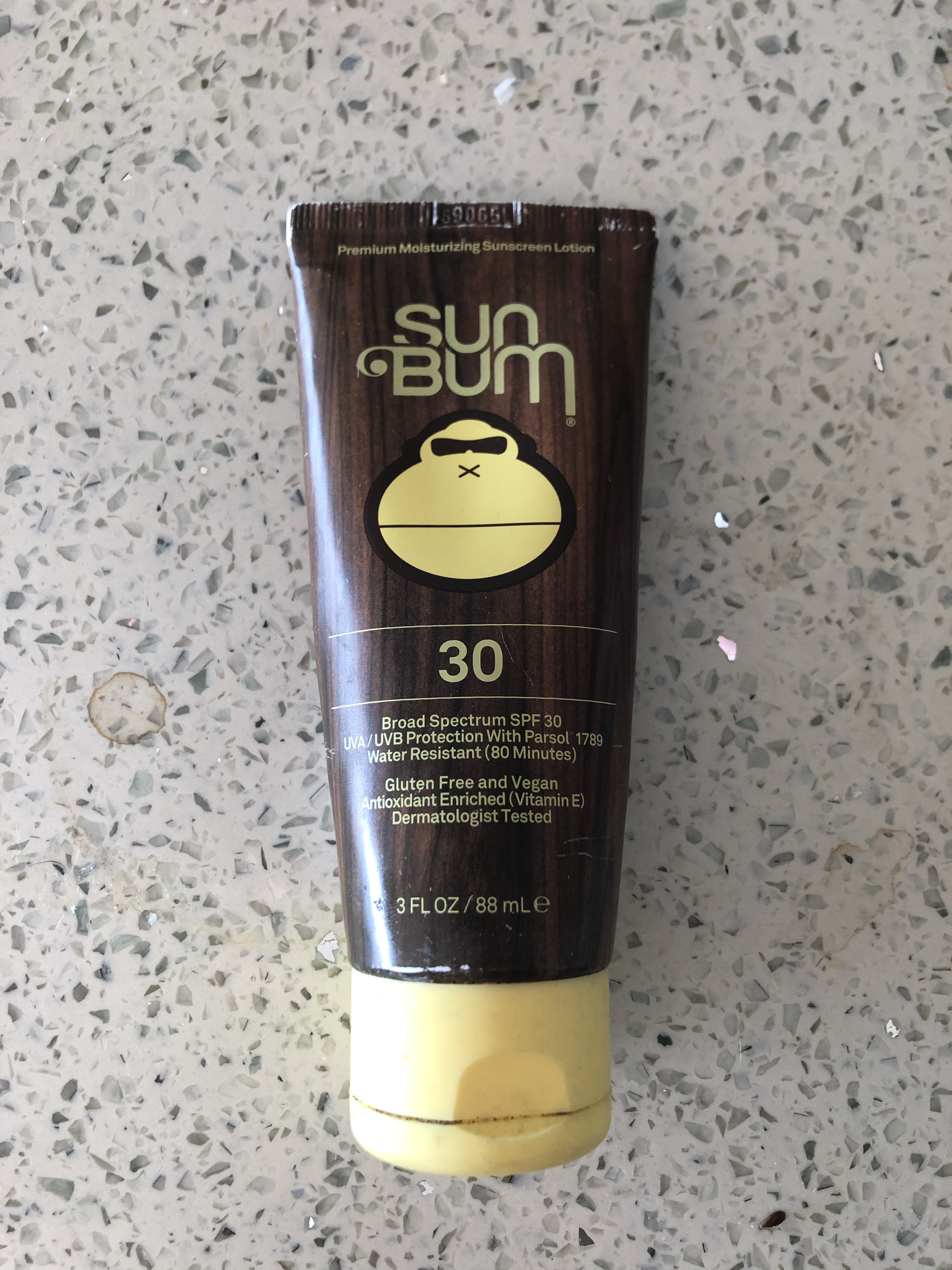
A tube of SPF 30 sunscreen on sale in the United States

Minimizing UV damage is especially important for children and light-skinned individuals and those who have sun sensitivity for medical reasons, including medical use of retinoids.

=== Risks ===
In February 2019, the US Food and Drug Administration (FDA) started classifying already approved UV filter molecules into three categories: those which are generally recognized as safe and effective (GRASE), those which are non-GRASE due to safety issues, and those requiring further evaluation. As of 2021, only zinc oxide and titanium dioxide are recognized as GRASE. Two previously approved UV filters, para-aminobenzoic acid (PABA) and trolamine salicylate, were banned in 2021 due to human safety concerns (such as high rates of severe allergic contact dermatitis and bleeding risks). The consensus of public health bodies is that the risk of sun-induced skin cancer heavily outweighs unproven concerns about the toxicity of currently approved UV filters. However, environmental advocates frequently emphasize the use of mineral sunscreens (zinc oxide or titanium dioxide) as a precautionary measure to protect coral reef ecosystems.

Regulators can investigate and ban UV filters over safety concerns (such as PABA), which can result in withdrawal of products from the consumer market. Regulators such as the TGA and the FDA have also been concerned with recent reports of manufacturing contamination in certain sunscreen products involving known possible human carcinogens such as benzene. Benzene is not a sunscreen active ingredient; rather, independent laboratory testing carried out by Valisure found benzene contamination in 27% of the aerosol sunscreens they tested, stemming from impurities in the butane propellants used in spray cans. Some batches had up to triple the FDA's conditionally restricted limit of 2 parts per million (ppm). This resulted in a voluntary recall by major sunscreen brands implicated in the testing, and regulators continue to help publicise and coordinate these voluntary recalls. V.O.C.s (Volatile Organic Compounds) such as benzene are particularly harmful in sunscreen formulations as many active and inactive ingredients can increase permeation across the skin.

==== Allergic contact dermatitis ====
There is a risk of an allergic reaction to sunscreen for some individuals, as "Typical allergic contact dermatitis may occur in individuals allergic to any of the ingredients that are found in sunscreen products or cosmetic preparations that have a sunscreen component. The rash can occur anywhere on the body where the substance has been applied and sometimes may spread to unexpected sites."

Allergic contact dermatitis reactions may occur to both sunscreen chemicals themselves, and to other ingredients (excipients) of creams and lotions. Some of the more problematic ingredients, such as isopropyl dibenzoylmethane, have now been largely withdrawn from the market. Currently used sensitizing agents include Benzophenone 3 (oxybenzone). Among non-sunscreen excipients commonly found in sunscreens, cinnamates can cause allergic contact dermatitis.

==== Vitamin D production ====
There are some concerns about potential vitamin D deficiency arising from prolonged use of sunscreen. The typical use of sunscreen does not usually result in vitamin D deficiency; however, extensive usage may. Sunscreen prevents ultraviolet light from reaching the skin, and even moderate protection can substantially reduce vitamin D synthesis. However, adequate amounts of vitamin D can be obtained via diet or supplements. Vitamin D overdose is impossible from UV exposure due to an equilibrium the skin reaches in which vitamin D degrades as quickly as it is created.

High-SPF sunscreens filter out most UVB radiation, which triggers vitamin D production in the skin. However, clinical studies show that regular sunscreen use does not lead to vitamin D deficiency. Even high-SPF sunscreens allow a small amount of UVB to reach the skin, sufficient for vitamin D synthesis. Additionally, brief, unprotected sun exposure can produce ample vitamin D, but this exposure also risks significant DNA damage and skin cancer. To avoid these risks, vitamin D can be obtained safely through diet and supplements. Foods like fatty fish, fortified milk, and orange juice, along with supplements, provide necessary vitamin D without harmful sun exposure.

Studies have shown that sunscreen with a high UVA protection factor enabled significantly higher vitamin D synthesis than a low UVA protection factor sunscreen, likely because it allows more UVB transmission.

== Measurements of protection ==
=== Sun protection factor and labeling ===
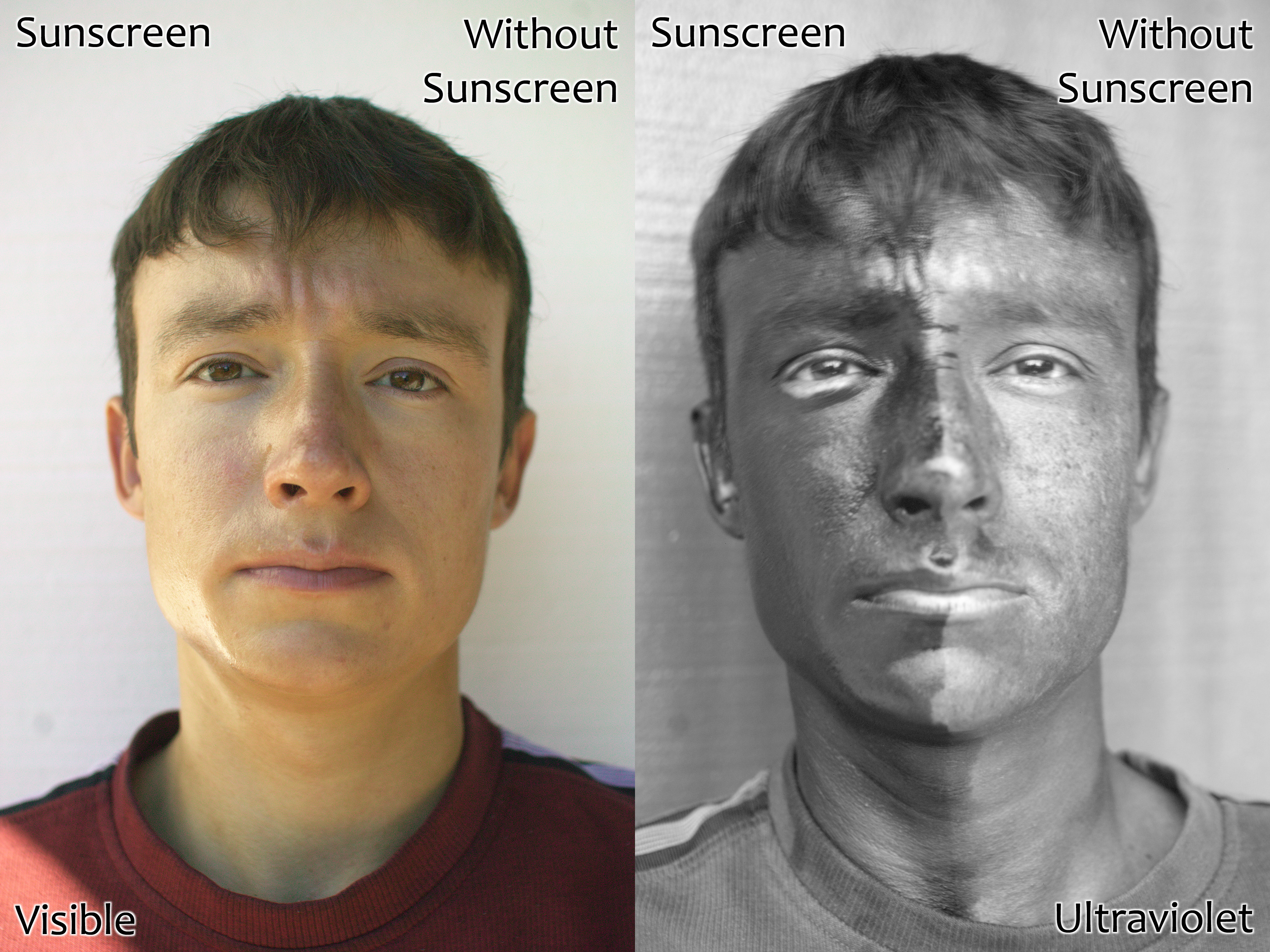
Two photographs showing the effect of applying sunscreens in visible light and in UVA. The photograph on the right was taken using ultraviolet photography shortly after application of sunscreen to half of the face.

The sun protection factor (SPF rating, introduced in 1974) is a measure of the fraction of sunburn-producing UV rays that reach the skin. For example, "SPF 15" means that 1/15 of the burning radiation will reach the skin, assuming sunscreen is applied evenly at a thick dosage of 2 milligrams per square centimeter (mg/cm^{2}). Sunscreens with higher SPF do not last or remain effective on the skin any longer than lower SPF and must be continually reapplied as directed, usually every two hours.

The SPF is an imperfect measure of skin damage because invisible damage and skin melanomas are also caused by ultraviolet A (UVA, wavelengths 315–400 or 320–400 nm), which does not primarily cause reddening or pain. Conventional sunscreen blocks very little UVA radiation relative to the nominal SPF; broad-spectrum sunscreens are designed to protect against both UVB and UVA. According to a 2004 study, UVA also causes DNA damage to cells deep within the skin, increasing the risk of melanomas. Even some products labeled "broad-spectrum UVA/UVB protection" have not always provided good protection against UVA rays. Titanium dioxide probably gives good protection but does not completely cover the UVA spectrum, with early 2000s research suggesting that zinc oxide is superior to titanium dioxide at wavelengths 340–380 nm.

Owing to consumer confusion over the real degree and duration of protection offered, labelling restrictions are enforced in several countries. In the EU, sunscreen labels can only go up to SPF 50+ (initially listed as 30 but quickly revised to 50). Australia's Therapeutic Goods Administration increased the upper limit from 30+ to 50+ in 2012. In its 2007 and 2011 draft rules, the US Food and Drug Administration (FDA) proposed a maximum SPF label of 50, to limit unrealistic claims. (As of August 2019, the FDA has not adopted the SPF 50 limit.) Others have proposed restricting the active ingredients to an SPF of no more than 50, due to lack of evidence that higher dosages provide more meaningful protection. Different sunscreen ingredients have different effectiveness against UVA and UVB.

UV sunlight spectrum (on a summer day in the Netherlands), along with the CIE Erythemal action spectrum. The effective spectrum is the product of the former two.

The SPF can be measured by applying sunscreen to the skin of a volunteer and measuring how long it takes before sunburn occurs when exposed to an artificial sunlight source. In the US, such an in vivo test is required by the FDA. It can also be measured in vitro with the help of a specially designed spectrometer. In this case, the actual transmittance of the sunscreen is measured, along with the degradation of the product due to being exposed to sunlight. In this case, the transmittance of the sunscreen must be measured over all wavelengths in sunlight's UVB–UVA range (290–400 nm), along with a table of how effective various wavelengths are in causing sunburn (the erythemal action spectrum) and the standard intensity spectrum of sunlight (see the figure). Such in vitro measurements agree very well with in vivo measurements.

Numerous methods have been devised for evaluation of UVA and UVB protection. The most-reliable spectrophotochemical methods eliminate the subjective nature of grading erythema.

The ultraviolet protection factor (UPF) is a similar scale developed for rating fabrics for sun protective clothing. According to recent testing by Consumer Reports, UPF ~30+ is typical for protective fabrics, while UPF ~20 is typical for standard summer fabrics.

Mathematically, the SPF (or the UPF) is calculated from measured data as:

$$\mathrm{SPF} = \frac{\int A(\lambda) E(\lambda)d\lambda}{\int A(\lambda) E(\lambda)/\mathrm{MPF}(\lambda) \, d\lambda},$$

where $E(\lambda)$ is the solar irradiance spectrum, $A(\lambda)$ the erythemal action spectrum, and $\mathrm{MPF}(\lambda)$ the monochromatic protection factor, all functions of the wavelength $\lambda$. The MPF is roughly the inverse of the transmittance at a given wavelength.

The combined SPF of two layers of sunscreen may be lower than the square of the single-layer SPF.

=== Ultraviolet A protection ===
==== Persistent pigment darkening ====
The persistent pigment darkening (PPD) method is a method of measuring UVA protection, similar to the SPF method of measuring sunburn protection. Originally developed in Japan, it is the preferred method used by manufacturers such as L'Oréal.

Instead of measuring erythema, the PPD method uses UVA radiation to cause a persistent darkening or tanning of the skin. Theoretically, a sunscreen with a PPD rating of 10 should allow a person 10 times as much UVA exposure as would be without protection. The PPD method is an in vivo test like SPF. In addition, the European Cosmetic and Perfumery Association (Colipa) has introduced a method that, it is claimed, can measure this in vitro and provide parity with the PPD method.

==== SPF equivalence ====
The UVA seal used in the EU

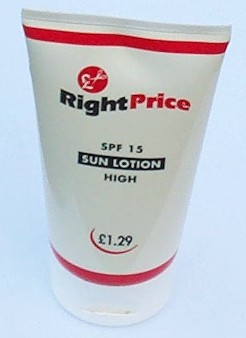
A tube of SPF 15 sun lotion

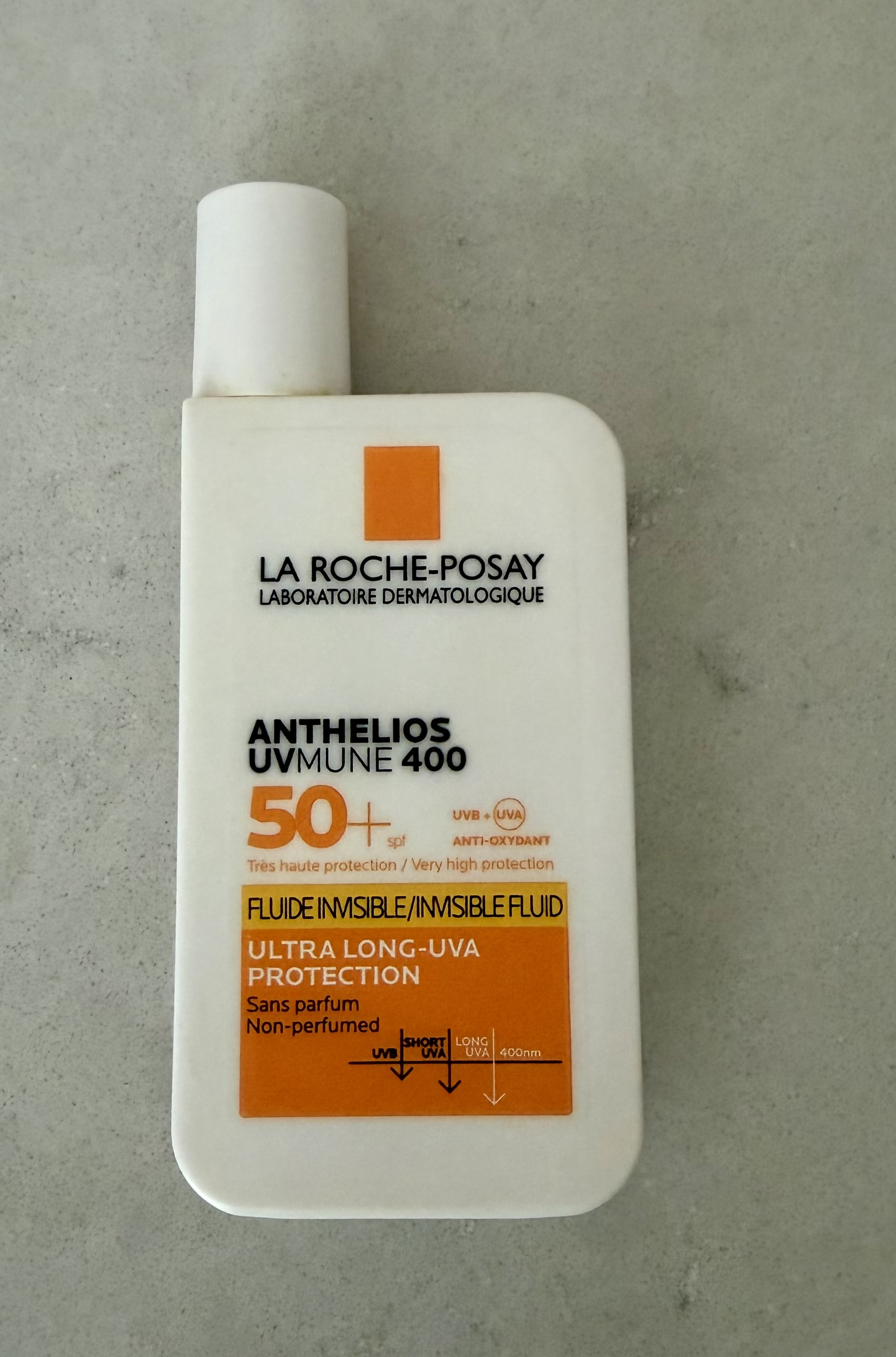
A bottle of SPF 50+ sunscreen available for sale in Europe with a UVA seal

As part of revised guidelines for sunscreens in the EU, there is a requirement to provide the consumer with a minimum level of UVA protection in relation to the SPF. This should be a UVA protection factor of at least 1/3 of the SPF to carry the UVA seal. The 1/3 threshold derives from the European Commission recommendation 2006/647/EC. This Commission recommendation specifies that the UVA protection factor should be measured using the PPD method as modified by the French health agency AFSSAPS (now ANSM) "or an equivalent degree of protection obtained with any in vitro method".

A set of final US FDA rules effective from summer 2012 defines the phrase "broad spectrum" as providing UVA protection proportional to the UVB protection, using a standardized testing method.

==== Star rating system ====
In the UK and Ireland, the Boots star rating system is a proprietary in vitro method used to describe the ratio of UVA to UVB protection offered by sunscreen creams and sprays. Based on original work by Brian Diffey at Newcastle University, the Boots Company in Nottingham, UK, developed a method that has been widely adopted by companies marketing these products in the UK.

One-star products provide the lowest ratio of UVA protection, five-star products the highest. The method was revised in light of the Colipa UVA PF test and the revised EU recommendations regarding UVA PF. The method still uses a spectrophotometer to measure absorption of UVA versus UVB; the difference stems from a requirement to pre-irradiate samples (where this was not previously required) to give a better indication of UVA protection and photostability when the product is used. With the current methodology, the lowest rating is three stars, the highest being five stars.

In August 2007, the FDA put out for consultation the proposal that a version of this protocol be used to inform users of American product of the protection that it gives against UVA; but this was not adopted, for fear it would be too confusing.

==== PA system ====
Asian brands, particularly Japanese ones, tend to use The Protection Grade of UVA (PA) system to measure the UVA protection that a sunscreen provides. The PA system is based on the PPD reaction and is now widely adopted on the labels of sunscreens. According to the Japan Cosmetic Industry Association, PA+ corresponds to a UVA protection factor between two and four, PA++ between four and eight, and PA+++ more than eight. This system was revised in 2013 to include PA++++ which corresponds to a PPD rating of sixteen or above.

=== Expiration date ===
Some sunscreens include an expiration date—a date indicating when they may become less effective.

== Active ingredients ==
Sunscreen formulations contain UV absorbing compounds (the active ingredients) dissolved or dispersed in a mixture of other ingredients, such as water, oils, moisturizers, and antioxidants. The UV filters can be either:

- Organic compounds which absorb ultraviolet light. Some organic compounds (bisoctrizole and phenylene bis-diphenyltriazine) also partially reflect incident light. These are also referred to as "chemical" UV filters.
- Inorganic compounds (zinc oxide and titanium dioxide), which reflect, scatter, and absorb UV light. These are also referred to as "mineral" filters.

The organic compounds used as UV filter are often aromatic molecules conjugated with carbonyl groups. This general structure allows the molecule to absorb high-energy ultraviolet rays and release the energy as lower-energy rays, thereby preventing the skin-damaging ultraviolet rays from reaching the skin. So, upon exposure to UV light, most of the ingredients (with the notable exception of avobenzone) do not undergo significant chemical change, allowing these ingredients to retain the UV-absorbing potency without significant photodegradation. A chemical stabilizer is included in some sunscreens containing avobenzone to slow its breakdown. The stability of avobenzone can also be improved by bemotrizinol, octocrylene and various other photostabilisers. Most organic compounds in sunscreens slowly degrade and become less effective over the course of several years even if stored properly, resulting in the expiration dates calculated for the product.

Sunscreening agents are used in some hair care products such as shampoos, conditioners and styling agents to protect against protein degradation and color loss. Currently, benzophenone-4 and ethylhexyl methoxycinnamate are the two sunscreens most commonly used in hair products. The common sunscreens used on skin are rarely used for hair products due to their texture and weight effects.

UV filters need usually to be approved by local agencies to be used in sunscreen formulations. However, the regulatory burden is higher in the US under the FDA than in most countries in Europe and Asia, as many of these countries class them as cosmetics and not drugs. As of 2023, 29 compounds are approved in the European Union and 17 in the USA. Zinc oxide was approved as a UV filter by the EU in 2016. Many of the ingredients awaiting approval by the FDA are relatively new, and developed to absorb UVA as many older filters only protect against UVB. The 2014 Sunscreen Innovation Act was passed to accelerate the FDA approval process, but the pace of approvals did not immediately change. Twelve years later, in June 2026, the FDA approved the use in sunscreens of bemotrizinol, which absorbs UVA and UVB rays and has for years been available in sunscreens sold in other countries. It was the first new ingredient the agency had approved for sunscreens in 20 years. The FDA had asked for public comment on bemotrizinol in December 2025.

Below is a table of active ingredients allowed in Australia, Canada, the EU, Japan, and the USA. If known, maximum concentration is listed in the country column. If approved with no maximum concentration listed or the maximum concentration isn't known, a check is displayed (✓). If the ingredient is not approved, an x is displayed (✗).

UV-filter	Other names	UVA	UVB	Maximum concentration by jurisdiction					Notes
UV-filter	Other names	UVA	UVB	AUS	CAN	EU	JP	USA	Notes
4-Methylbenzylidene camphor	Enzacamene, MBC		✓	4% (Therapeutic only)	4%	✗ (Banned 2025)	✗	✗	
Amiloxate	Isopentyl-4-methoxycinnamate, Isoamyl p-Methoxycinnamate, IMC		✓	10%	✗	10%	✗	✗^{*}	
Avobenzone	1-(4-methoxyphenyl)-3-(4-tert-butyl phenyl)propane-1,3-dione, Butyl methoxydibenzoylmethane	✓		5%	3%	5%	✗	3%	
Bemotrizinol	Bis-ethylhexyloxyphenol methoxyphenol triazine, BEMT, anisotriazine	✓	✓	10%	6%	10%	3%	6%	Proposed for approval by FDA in 2025 and approved in 2026
Benzophenone-9	CAS 3121-60-6, Sodium Dihydroxy Dimethoxy Disulfobenzophenone			✗	✗	✗	10%	✗	
Bis-(diethylaminohydroxybenzoyl benzoyl) piperazine	HAA299		✓	✗	✗	10%	✗	✗	
Bisdisulizole disodium	Neo Heliopan AP, Disodium Phenyl Dibenzimidazole Tetrasulfonate, DPDT	✓		10%	✗	10% (as acid)	✗	✗	Australia: dermal application only.
Bisoctrizole	Methylene Bis-Benzotriazolyl Tetramethylbutylphenol, MBBT	✓	✓	10%	5%	10%	10%	✗^{*}	
Cinoxate	2-Ethoxyethyl p-methoxycinnamate	✓	✓	6%	3%	✗	✗	3%	
Diethylamino hydroxybenzoyl hexyl benzoate	Parsol DHHB, Uvinul A Plus	✓		10%	✗	10%	10%	✗	
Dioxybenzone	Benzophenone-8	✓	✓	✓	3%	✗	✗	3%	
Drometrizole trisiloxane		✓	✓	15%	15%	15%	✗	✗	
Ecamsule	Terephthalylidene Dicamphor Sulfonic Acid	✓		10%	10%	10%	10%	3% (see note)	Approved in the US in certain formulations via New Drug Application (NDA) route only. Japanese limits applies to cosmetics not used on mucous membranes.
Ethylhexyl triazone	Octyl triazone, EHT		✓	5%	✗	5%	3%	✗^{*}	
Homosalate	Homomethyl salicylate		✓	15%	15%	7.34%	✗	15%	
Iscotrizinol	Diethylhexyl butamido triazone, DBT		✓	✗	✗	10%	5%	✗^{*}	
Menthyl anthranilate	Meradimate	✓		✓	5%	✗	✗	5%	
Methoxypropylamino cyclohexenylidene ethoxyethylcyanoacetate	S87, MCE	✓		3%	✗	3%	✗	✗	
Octocrylene	Eusolex OCR, Parsol 340, 2-Cyano-3,3-diphenyl acrylic acid, 2-ethylhexylester	✓	✓	✓	10%	✓	✓	10%	A proposal to ban it in the EU is under review by ECHA as of 2026
Octinoxate	Octyl-methoxycinnamate, Ethylhexyl methoxycinnamate, 2-Ethylhexyl-paramethoxycinnamate		✓	10%	7.5%	10%	20%	7.5%	Banned in Hawaii since 2021 — harmful to coral
Octyl salicylate	Octisalate, 2-Ethylhexyl salicylate		✓	5%	5%	5%	10%	5%	
Oxybenzone	Benzophenone-3	✓	✓	10%	6%	2.2% (body) / 6% (face)	✗	6%	Banned in Hawaii since 2018 — "harmful to coral reefs, fish, and other ocean life"
p-Aminobenzoic acid	PABA		✓	✗	✗	✗ (banned 2009)	✗	✗ (banned 2021)	Banned in the US in 2021 due to human safety concerns (such as high rates of severe allergic contact dermatitis and bleeding risks).
Padimate O	OD-PABA, octyldimethyl-PABA, σ-PABA		✓	8%	8%	✓	10%	8%	
Phenylbenzimidazole sulfonic acid	Ensulizole, PBSA		✓	4%	4%	8%	3%	4%	
Phenylene bis-diphenyltriazine	TriAsorB, S86	✓	✓	✗	✗	5%	✗	✗	
Polysilicone-15	Dimethico-diethylbenzalmalonate		✓	10%	✗ (see note)	10%	10%	✗	Allowed for use in Canada as a light stabilizer but not as a sunscreen agent
Sulisobenzone	2-Hydroxy-4-Methoxybenzophenone-5-sulfonic acid, 3-Benzoyl-4-hydroxy-6-methoxybenzenesulfonic acid, Benzophenone-4	✓	✓	10%	10%	5%	10%	10% (see note)	No longer marketed in the US but retains approval
Titanium dioxide	CI77891, TiO₂		✓	✓	25%	✓	No limit	25%	Generally recognized as safe and effective by the US FDA
Tris-biphenyl triazine		✓	✓	10%	✗	10%	✗	✗	
Trolamine salicylate	Triethanolamine salicylate		✓	12%	12%	✗	✗	✗ (banned 2021)	Banned in the US in 2021 due to human safety concerns (such as high rates of severe allergic contact dermatitis and bleeding risks).
Zinc oxide	CI77947, ZnO	✓	✓	No limit	25%	✓	No limit	25%	Generally recognized as safe and effective by the US FDA.

^{*} Time and Extent Application (TEA) submitted for FDA approval.

== Inactive ingredients ==
It is known that SPF is affected by not only the choice of active ingredients and the percentage of active ingredients but also the formulation of the vehicle/base. Final SPF is also impacted by the distribution of active ingredients in the sunscreen, how evenly the sunscreen applies on the skin, how well it dries down on the skin and the pH value of the product among other factors. Changing any inactive ingredient may potentially alter a sunscreen's SPF.

When combined with UV filters, added antioxidants can work synergistically to affect the overall SPF value positively. Furthermore, adding antioxidants to sunscreen can amplify its ability to reduce markers of extrinsic photoaging, grant better protection from UV induced pigment formation, mitigate skin lipid peroxidation, improve the photostability of the active ingredients, neutralize reactive oxygen species formed by irradiated photocatalysts (e.g., uncoated TiO₂) and aid in DNA repair post-UVB damage, thus enhancing the efficiency and safety of sunscreens. Compared with sunscreen alone, it has been shown that the addition of antioxidants has the potential to suppress ROS formation by an additional 1.7-fold for SPF 4 sunscreens and 2.4-fold for SPF 15-to-SPF 50 sunscreens, but the efficacy depends on how well the sunscreen in question has been formulated. Sometimes osmolytes are also incorporated into commercially available sunscreens in addition to antioxidants since they also aid in protecting the skin from the detrimental effects of UVR. Examples include the osmolyte taurine, which has demonstrated the ability to protects against UVB-radiation induced immunosuppression and the osmolyte ectoine, which aids in counteracting cellular accelerated aging & UVA-radiation induced premature photoaging.

Other inactive ingredients can also assist in photostabilizing unstable UV filters. Cyclodextrins have demonstrated the ability to reduce photodecomposition, protect antioxidants and limit skin penetration past the uppermost skin layers, allowing them to longer maintain the protection factor of sunscreens with UV filters that are highly unstable and/or easily permeate to the lower layers of the skin. Similarly, film-forming polymers like polyester-8 and polycryleneS1 have the ability to protect the efficacy of older organic UV filters by preventing them from destabilizing due to extended light exposure. These kinds of ingredients also increase the water resistance of sunscreen formulations. In the 2010s and 2020s, there has been increasing interest in sunscreens that protect the wearer from the sun's high-energy visible light and infrared light as well as ultraviolet light. This is due to newer research revealing that blue, violet, and near infrared light work synergistically with UV light in contributing to oxidative stress, free radical generation, dermal cellular damage, suppressed skin healing, decreased immunity, erythema, inflammation, dryness, and several aesthetic concerns, such as: wrinkle formation, loss of skin elasticity and dyspigmentation. Increasingly, a number of commercial sunscreens are being produced that have manufacturer claims regarding skin protection from blue light, infrared light and even air pollution. However, as of 2021 there are no regulatory guidelines or mandatory testing protocols that govern these claims. Historically, the American FDA has only recognized protection from sunburn (via UVB protection) and protection from skin cancer (via SPF 15+ with some UVA protection) as drug/medicinal sunscreen claims, so they do not have regulatory authority over sunscreen claims regarding protecting the skin from damage from these other environmental stressors. Since sunscreen claims not related to protection from ultraviolet light are treated as cosmeceutical claims rather than drug/medicinal claims, the innovative technologies and additive ingredients used to allegedly reduce the damage from these other environmental stressors may vary widely from brand to brand.

Some studies show that mineral sunscreens primarily made with substantially large particles (i.e., neither nano nor micronized) may help protect from visible and infrared light to some degree, but these sunscreens are often unacceptable to consumers due to leaving an obligatory opaque white cast on the skin. Further research has shown that sunscreens with added iron oxide pigments and/or pigmentary titanium dioxide can provide the wearer with a substantial amount of HEVL protection. Cosmetic chemists have found that other cosmetic-grade pigments can be functional filler ingredients. Mica was discovered to have significant synergistic effects with UVR filters when formulated in sunscreens, in that it can notably increase the formula's ability to protect the wearer from HEVL.

There is a growing amount of research demonstrating that adding various vitamer antioxidants (eg; retinol, alpha tocopherol, gamma tocopherol, tocopheryl acetate, ascorbic acid, ascorbyl tetraisopalmitate, ascorbyl palmitate, sodium ascorbyl phosphate, ubiquinone) and/or a mixture of certain botanical antioxidants (eg; epigallocatechin-3-gallate, b-carotene, vitis vinifera, silymarin, spirulina extract, chamomile extract and possibly others) to sunscreens efficaciously aids in reducing damage from the free radicals produced by exposure to solar ultraviolet radiation, visible light, near infrared radiation and infrared-a radiation. Since sunscreen's active ingredients work preventatively by creating a shielding film on the skin that absorbs, scatters, and reflects light before it can reach the skin, UV filters have been deemed an ideal "first line of defense" against sun damage when exposure can't be avoided. Antioxidants have been deemed a good "second line of defense" since they work responsively by decreasing the overall burden of free radicals that do reach the skin. The degree of the free radical protection from the entire solar spectral range that a sunscreen can offer has been termed the "radical protection factor" (RPF) by some researchers.

== Application ==
Most people do not apply sunscreen as directed, reducing its efficacy. The most major factor is that people do not apply it thickly enough.

SPF 30 or above must be used to effectively prevent UV rays from damaging skin cells. This is the amount that is recommended to prevent against skin cancer. Sunscreen must also be applied thoroughly and re-applied during the day, especially after being in the water. Special attention should be paid to areas like the ears and nose, which are common spots of skin cancer. Dermatologists may be able to advise about what sunscreen is best to use for specific skin types.

The dose used in FDA sunscreen testing is 2 mg/cm^{2} of exposed skin. For an average person this would require approximately 35 ml (approximately 1 oz, six teaspoonfuls, or a golf ball-size amount) of product applied evenly to the uncovered body area. Larger or smaller individuals should scale these quantities accordingly. Considering only the face, this translates to about 1/4 to 1/3 of a teaspoon for the average adult face.

Some studies have shown that people commonly apply only 1/4 to 1/2 of the amount recommended for achieving the rated sun protection factor (SPF), and in consequence the effective SPF should be downgraded to a 4th root or a square root of the advertised value, respectively. A later study found a significant exponential relation between SPF and the amount of sunscreen applied, and the results are closer to linearity than expected by theory. The formulation of the sunscreen matters as well; people are less likely to apply mineral (inorganic) sunscreens such as zinc oxide thickly enough relative to chemical (organic) sunscreens.

Claims that substances in pill form can act as sunscreen are false and disallowed in the United States.

== Regulation ==
=== Palau ===
In January 2020, Palau banned the manufacturing and selling of sun cream products containing any of the following ingredients: benzophenone-3, octyl methoxycinnamate, octocrylene, 4-methyl-benzylidene camphor, triclosan, methylparaben, ethylparaben, butylparaben, benzyl paraben, and phenoxyethanol. The decision was taken to protect the local coral reef and sea life. Those compounds are known or suspected to be harmful to coral or other sea life.

=== United States ===
Sunscreen labeling standards have been evolving in the United States since the FDA first adopted the SPF calculation in 1978. The FDA issued a comprehensive set of rules in June 2011, taking effect in 2012–2013, designed to help consumers identify and select suitable sunscreen products offering protection from sunburn, early skin aging, and skin cancer. However, unlike other countries, the United States classifies sunscreen as an over-the-counter drug rather than a cosmetic product. As FDA approval of a new drug is typically far slower than for a cosmetic, the result is fewer ingredients available for sunscreen formulations in the US compared with many other countries.

In 2019, the FDA proposed tighter regulations on sun protection and general safety, including the requirement that sunscreen products with SPF greater than 15 must be broad spectrum, and imposing a prohibition on products with SPF greater than 60.

- To be classified as "broad spectrum", sunscreen products must provide protection against both UVA and UVB, with specific tests required for both.
- Claims of products being "waterproof" or "sweatproof" are prohibited, while the terms "sunblock" and "instant protection" and "protection for more than 2 hours" are all prohibited without specific FDA approval.
- "Water resistance" claims on the front label must indicate how long the sunscreen remains effective and specify whether this applies to swimming or sweating, based on standard testing.
- Sunscreens must include standardized "Drug Facts" information on the container. However, there is no regulation that deems it necessary to mention whether the contents contain nanoparticles of mineral ingredients. Furthermore, US products do not require the expiration date of products to be displayed on the label.

In 2021, the FDA introduced an additional administrative order regarding the safety classification of cosmetic UV filters, to categorize a given ingredient as either:

- Generally recognized as safe and effective (GRASE)
- Not GRASE due to safety issues
- Not GRASE because additional safety data are needed.

To be considered a GRASE active ingredient, the FDA requires it to have undergone both non-clinical animal studies as well as human clinical studies. The animal studies evaluate the potential for inducing carcinogenesis, genetic or reproductive harm, and any toxic effects of the ingredient once absorbed and distributed in the body. The human trials expand upon the animal trials, providing additional information on safety in the pediatric population, protection against UVA and UVB, and the potential for skin reactions after application. Two previously approved UV filters, para-aminobenzoic acid (PABA) and trolamine salicylate, were reclassified as not GRASE due to safety concerns and have consequently been removed from the market.

In June 2026, bemotrizinol was approved for use in sunscreens in the United States.

=== European Union ===
In the European Union, sunscreens are considered a cosmetic product rather than an over-the-counter drug. These products are regulated by the Cosmetic Regulation (EC) No 1223/2009, which was created in July 2013. The recommendations for formulating sunscreen products are guided by the Scientific Community on Consumer Safety (SCCS). The regulation of cosmetic products in Europe requires the producer to follow six domains when formulating their product:

1. Cosmetic safety report must be conducted by a qualified personnel
2. The product must not contain substances banned for cosmetic products
3. The product must not contain substances restricted for cosmetic products
4. The product must adhere to the approved list of colourants for cosmetic products.
5. The product must adhere to the approved list of preservatives for cosmetic products.
6. The product must contain UV filters approved in Europe.

According to the EC, sunscreens at a minimum must exhibit:

1. A SPF of 6
2. UVA/UVB ratio ≥ 1/3
3. The critical wavelength is at least 370 nanometers (indicating that it is "broad-spectrum").
4. Instructions for using and precautions.
5. Evidence the sunscreen meets UVA and SPF requirements.
6. Labels of European sunscreens must disclose the use of nanoparticles in addition to the shelf life of the product.

=== Canada ===
Regulation of sunscreen is dependent on the ingredient used; It is then classified and follows the regulations for either natural health products or drug product. Companies must complete a product licensing application prior to introducing their sunscreen on the market.

=== ASEAN (Brunei, Cambodia, Indonesia, Laos, Malaysia, Myanmar, the Philippines, Singapore, Thailand, Vietnam) ===
The regulation of sunscreen for ASEAN countries closely follows European regulations. However, products are regulated by the ASEAN scientific community rather than the SCCS. Additionally, there are minor differences in the allowed phrasing printed on sunscreen packages.

=== Japan ===
Sunscreen is considered a cosmetic product, and is regulated under the Japan Cosmetic Industry Association (JCIA). Products are regulated mostly for the type of UV filter and SPF. SPF may range from 2 to 50.

=== China ===
Sunscreen is regulated as cosmetic product under the State Food and Drug Administration (SFDA). The list of approved filters is the same as it is in Europe. However, sunscreen in China requires safety testing in animal studies prior to approval.

=== Australia ===
Sunscreens are divided into therapeutic and cosmetic sunscreens. Therapeutic sunscreens are classified into primary sunscreens (SPF ≥ 4) and secondary sunscreens (SPF < 4). Therapeutic sunscreens are regulated by the Therapeutic Goods Administration (TGA). Cosmetic sunscreens are products that contain a sunscreen ingredient, but do not protect from the sun. These products are regulated by the National Industrial Chemicals Notification and Assessment Scheme (NICNAS).

=== New Zealand ===
Sunscreen is classified as a cosmetic product, and closely follows EU regulations. However, New Zealand has a more extensive list of approved UV filters than Europe.

=== Mercosur ===
Mercosur is an international group consisting of Argentina, Brazil, Paraguay, and Uruguay. Regulation of sunscreen as a cosmetic product began in 2012, and is similar in structure to the European regulations. Sunscreens must meet specific standards including water resistance, sun protection factor, and a UVA/UVB ratio of 1/3. The list of approved sunscreen ingredients is greater than in Europe or the US.

== Environmental effects ==
Some sunscreen active ingredients have been shown to cause toxicity towards marine life and coral, resulting in bans in different states, countries and ecological areas. Coral reefs, comprising organisms in delicate ecological balances, are vulnerable to even minor environmental disturbances. Factors like temperature changes, invasive species, pollution, and detrimental fishing practices have previously been highlighted as threats to coral health.

Many sunscreen brands have opted to include terms such as "reef-friendly" or "reef-safe" to signal that they are free of coral-harming chemicals, but these terms are unregulated by any governing agency and do not have an agreed-upon definition.

In 2018, Hawaii passed legislation that prohibits the sale of sunscreens containing oxybenzone and octinoxate. In sufficient concentrations, oxybenzone and octinoxate can damage coral DNA, induce deformities in coral larvae, heighten the risk of viral infections, and make corals more vulnerable to bleaching. Such threats are even more concerning given that coral ecosystems are already compromised by climate change, pollution, and other environmental stressors. While there is ongoing debate regarding the real-world concentrations of these chemicals versus laboratory settings, an assessment in Kahaluu Bay in Hawaii showed oxybenzone concentrations to be 262 times higher than what the U.S. Environmental Protection Agency designates as high-risk. Another study in Hanauma Bay found levels of the chemical ranging from 30 ng/L to 27,880 ng/L, noting that concentrations beyond 63 ng/L could induce toxicity in corals.

Echoing Hawaii's initiative, other regions including Key West, Florida, the U.S. Virgin Islands, Bonaire, and Palau have also instituted bans on sunscreens containing oxybenzone and octinoxate.

The environmental implications of sunscreen usage on marine ecosystems are multi-faceted and vary in severity. In a 2015 study, titanium dioxide nanoparticles, when introduced to water and subjected to ultraviolet light, were shown to amplify the production of hydrogen peroxide, a compound known to damage phytoplankton. In 2002, research indicated that sunscreens might escalate virus abundance in seawater, compromising the marine environment in a manner akin to other pollutants. Further probing the matter, a 2008 investigation examining a variety of sunscreen brands, protective factors, and concentrations revealed unanimous bleaching effects on hard corals. Alarmingly, the degree of bleaching magnified with increasing sunscreen quantities. When assessing individual compounds prevalent in sunscreens, substances such as butylparaben, ethylhexylmethoxycinnamate, benzophenone-3, and 4-methylbenzylidene camphor induced complete coral bleaching at even minimal concentrations.

== Research and development ==
New products are in development such as sunscreens based on bioadhesive nanoparticles. These function by encapsulating commercially used UV filters, while being not only adherent to the skin but also non-penetrant. This strategy inhibits primary UV-induced damage as well as secondary free radicals. UV filters based on sinapate esters are also under study. Sunscreens with natural and sustainable connotations are increasingly being developed, as a result of increased environmental concern. Although plant oils have been evaluated as sunscreens, a 2021 study of 14 such oils found UVB protection factors below 4 and concluded that vegetable oils are unsuitable.
