= SLX =

SLX may refer to:

- A Shimano bicycle groupset
- Acura SLX, a Honda SUV
- Montello SLX, a Pinarello bicycle frameset
- Parsol SLX, a brand of Polysilicone-15, used in hair products
- Salt Cay Airport
