= Bemotrizinol =

Names
- Preferred IUPAC name 2,2′-[6-(4-Methoxyphenyl)-1,3,5-triazine-2,4-diyl]bis{5-[(2-ethylhexyl)oxy]phenol}
- Other names Tinosorb S Bis-ethylhexyloxyphenol methoxyphenyl triazine Anisotriazine

Identifiers
| CAS Number | 187393-00-6 |
| 3D model (JSmol) | Interactive image |
| Abbreviations | BEMT |
| ChEBI | CHEBI:135857 |
| ChEMBL | ChEMBL2104956 |
| ChemSpider | 10645286 |
| ECHA InfoCard | 100.109.468 |
| EC Number | 606-111-6 |
| PubChem CID | 11954320 |
| UNII | PWZ1720CBH |
| CompTox Dashboard (EPA) | DTXSID40896984 |
- InChI: InChI=1S/C38H49N3O5/c1-6-10-12-26(8-3)24-45-30-18-20-32(34(42)22-30)37-39-36(28-14-16-29(44-5)17-15-28)40-38(41-37)33-21-19-31(23-35(33)43)46-25-27(9-4)13-11-7-2/h14-23,26-27,42-43H,6-13,24-25H2,1-5H3 Key: XVAMCHGMPYWHNL-UHFFFAOYSA-N; InChI=1/C38H49N3O5/c1-6-10-12-26(8-3)24-45-30-18-20-32(34(42)22-30)37-39-36(28-14-16-29(44-5)17-15-28)40-38(41-37)33-21-19-31(23-35(33)43)46-25-27(9-4)13-11-7-2/h14-23,26-27,42-43H,6-13,24-25H2,1-5H3 Key: XVAMCHGMPYWHNL-UHFFFAOYAK
- SMILES: CCC(CCCC)COc4ccc(c1nc(nc(n1)c2ccc(cc2O)OCC(CC)CCCC)c3ccc(OC)cc3)c(O)c4

Properties
| Chemical formula | C_{38}H_{49}N_{3}O_{5} |
| Molar mass | 627.826 g·mol^{−1} |

Hazards
- GHS labelling
| Hazard statements | H413 |
| Precautionary statements | P273, P501 |
- Except where otherwise noted, data are given for materials in their standard state (at 25 °C [77 °F], 100 kPa). verify (what is ?) Infobox references

Bemotrizinol (INN, USAN, INCI name bis-ethylhexyloxyphenol methoxyphenyl triazine, BEMT; marketed as Escalol S, Parsol Shield, and Tinosorb S) is an oil-soluble organic compound that is added to sunscreens to absorb UV rays.

Bemotrizinol is a broad-spectrum UV absorber, absorbing both UVB and UVA rays. It has two absorption peaks, 310 and 340 nm. It is highly photostable. Even after 50 MEDs (minimal erythemal doses), 98.4% remains intact. It helps prevent the photodegradation of other sunscreen actives like avobenzone. Tinosorb S Aqua, recently developed by BASF, is bemotrizinol in a PMMA matrix dispersed in water. This makes it possible to add bemotrizinol to the water phase.

Bemotrizinol has strong synergistic effects on the SPF when formulated with bisoctrizole, ethylhexyl triazone, or iscotrizinol. It is the most effective UV absorber available measured by SPF, based on the maximum concentration permitted by European legislation.

It has been approved in the European Union since 2000, and some other parts of the world, including Australia. In June 2026, bemotrizinol was approved for use in sunscreens in the United States.

Unlike some other organic sunscreen actives, it shows no estrogenic effects in vitro.
