= C24H31NO4 =

The molecular formula C_{24}H_{31}NO_{4} (molar mass: 397.50 g/mol) may refer to:

- Diethylamino hydroxybenzoyl hexyl benzoate, an organic compound used in sunscreens
- Drotaverine, an antispasmodic drug
