= Menthyl anthranilate =

Sunscreening agent

Names
- IUPAC name (1R,3R,4S)-p-Menthan-3-yl 2-aminobenzoate
- Systematic IUPAC name (1R,2S,5R)-5-Methyl-2-(propan-2-yl)cyclohexyl 2-aminobenzoate
- Other names Meradimate; Menthyl-o-aminobenzoate; Anthranilic acid menthyl ester; Anthranilic acid p-menth-3-yl ester

Identifiers
CAS Number	307556-71-4
3D model (JSmol)	Interactive image
ChemSpider	5415748
ECHA InfoCard	100.004.664
PubChem CID	7059574
UNII	J9QGD60OUZ
CompTox Dashboard (EPA)	DTXSID3047895
- InChI: InChI=1S/C17H25NO2/c1-11(2)13-9-8-12(3)10-16(13)20-17(19)14-6-4-5-7-15(14)18/h4-7,11-13,16H,8-10,18H2,1-3H3/t12-,13+,16-/m1/s1 Key: SOXAGEOHPCXXIO-DVOMOZLQSA-N; InChI=1/C17H25NO2/c1-11(2)13-9-8-12(3)10-16(13)20-17(19)14-6-4-5-7-15(14)18/h4-7,11-13,16H,8-10,18H2,1-3H3/t12-,13+,16-/m1/s1 Key: SOXAGEOHPCXXIO-DVOMOZLQBB
- SMILES: O=C(O[C@H]1[C@@H](CC[C@H](C1)C)C(C)C)c2ccccc2N

Properties
Chemical formula	C_{17}H_{25}NO_{2}
Molar mass	275.392 g·mol^{−1}
- Except where otherwise noted, data are given for materials in their standard state (at 25 °C [77 °F], 100 kPa). Infobox references

Menthyl anthranilate (meradimate) is a sunscreening agent. It is one of the 17 ingredients approved by the Food and Drug Administration for use in over-the-counter sunscreen products.
