= 2-Ethylhexyl salicylate =

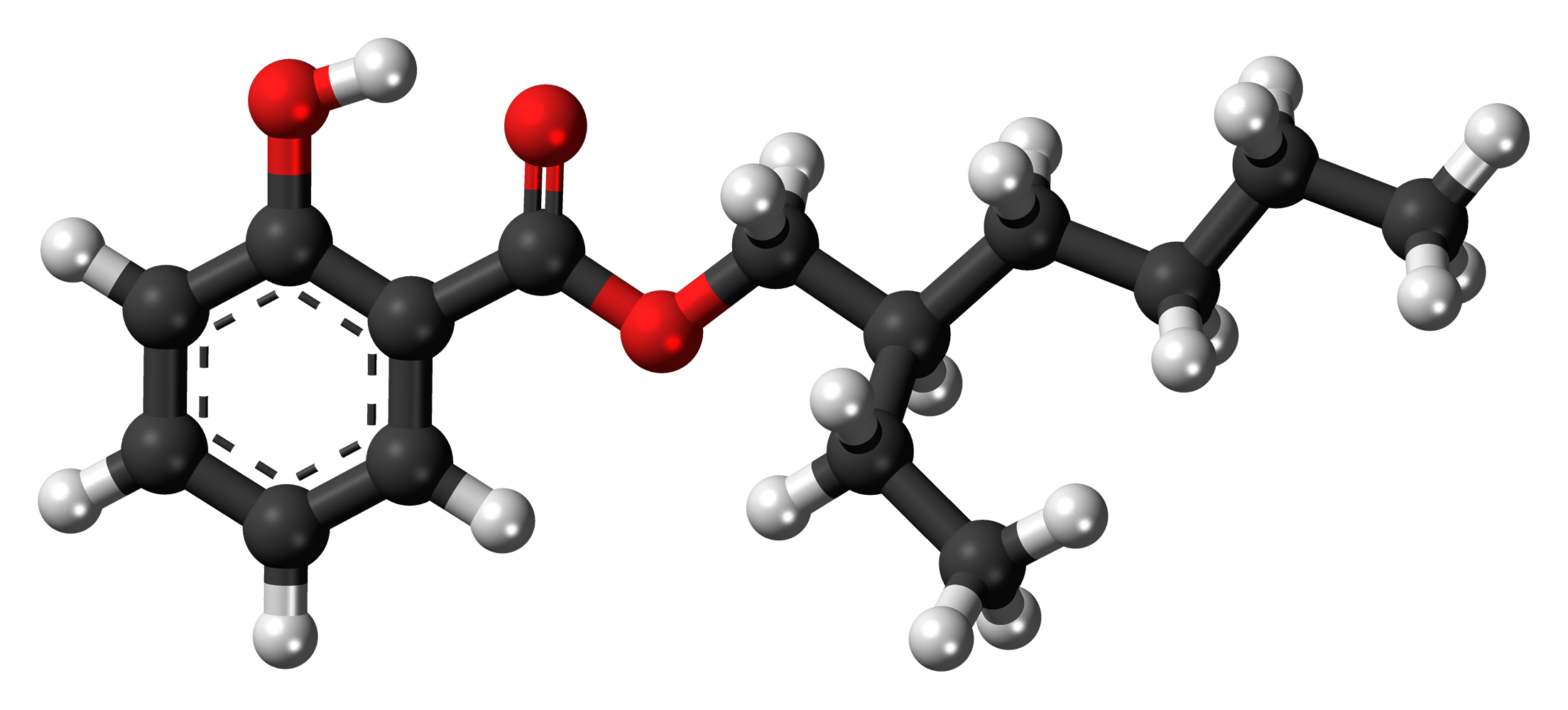

Names
- Preferred IUPAC name 2-Ethylhexyl 2-hydroxybenzoate
- Other names Ethylhexyl Salicylate; octisalate; 2-ethylhexyl salicylate; ethyl hexyl salicylate; 2-ethylhexyl ester salicylic acid; salicylic acid, 2-ethylhexyl ester; benzoic acid, 2-hydroxy-, 2-ethylhexyl ester; 2-ethylhexyl ester benzoic acid, 2-hydroxy-; 2-hydroxy- 2-ethylhexyl ester benzoic acid;

Identifiers
| CAS Number | 118-60-5 |
| 3D model (JSmol) | Interactive image |
| ChEMBL | ChEMBL117388 |
| ChemSpider | 8061 |
| ECHA InfoCard | 100.003.877 |
| PubChem CID | 8364 |
| UNII | 4X49Y0596W |
| CompTox Dashboard (EPA) | DTXSID7040734 |
- InChI: InChI=1S/C15H22O3/c1-3-5-8-12(4-2)11-18-15(17)13-9-6-7-10-14(13)16/h6-7,9-10,12,16H,3-5,8,11H2,1-2H3 Key: FMRHJJZUHUTGKE-UHFFFAOYSA-N; InChI=1/C15H22O3/c1-3-5-8-12(4-2)11-18-15(17)13-9-6-7-10-14(13)16/h6-7,9-10,12,16H,3-5,8,11H2,1-2H3 Key: FMRHJJZUHUTGKE-UHFFFAOYAL
- SMILES: CCCCC(CC)COC(=O)C1=CC=CC=C1O

Properties
| Chemical formula | C_{15}H_{22}O_{3} |
| Molar mass | 250.33 g/mol |
| Density | 1.014 g/cm^{3} |
| Melting point | < 25 °C (77 °F; 298 K) |
| Boiling point | 189 °C (372 °F; 462 K) |

Hazards
| NFPA 704 (fire diamond) | 1 1 |
- Except where otherwise noted, data are given for materials in their standard state (at 25 °C [77 °F], 100 kPa). verify (what is ?) Infobox references

2-Ethylhexyl salicylate, also known as ethylhexyl salicylate (INCI name), octisalate, or octyl salicylate, is an organic compound used as an ingredient in sunscreens and cosmetics to absorb UVB (ultraviolet) rays from the sun. It is an ester formed by the condensation of salicylic acid with 2-ethylhexanol. It is a colorless oily liquid with a floral odor.

The salicylate portion of the molecule absorbs ultraviolet light, protecting skin from the harmful effects of exposure to sunlight. The ethylhexanol portion is a fatty alcohol, adding emollient and oil-like (water resistant) properties.

== Safety ==
According to the classification provided by companies to ECHA in REACH registrations this substance is highly toxic to aquatic life, with long-lasting effects, and is suspected of fetal harm.

In 2020 the ECHA decided that a fish sexual development test of the chemical was necessary, because the compound may be an endocrine disruptor.

The compound was identified in a court case brought by German chemical company Symrise who claimed that the ingredient used in sunscreen did not require animal testing.

Symrise lost the appeal against a European Chemicals Agency (ECHA) decision that requires the German manufacturer to test sunscreen ingredients on animals.

The Court of Justice of the European Union (CJEU) decision applies to two formerly approved ingredients used exclusively in sunscreens — UV filter homosalate and 2-ethylhexyl salicylate.

In 2007 octyl salicylate and all other salicylates were found to have a good safety profile. It is often used to improve affinity and reduce photodegradation of other sunscreen ingredients (such as oxybenzone and avobenzone), and under 1% of the applied dose of octyl salicylate penetrates through the skin. Although more stable, octyl salicylate is a weak organic UVB absorber.

Octyl salicylate does not produce reactive oxygen species when exposed to sunlight. However, it does have some minor sensitization potential; with some individuals experiencing minimal to mild skin irritation.
