= Bisdisulizole disodium =

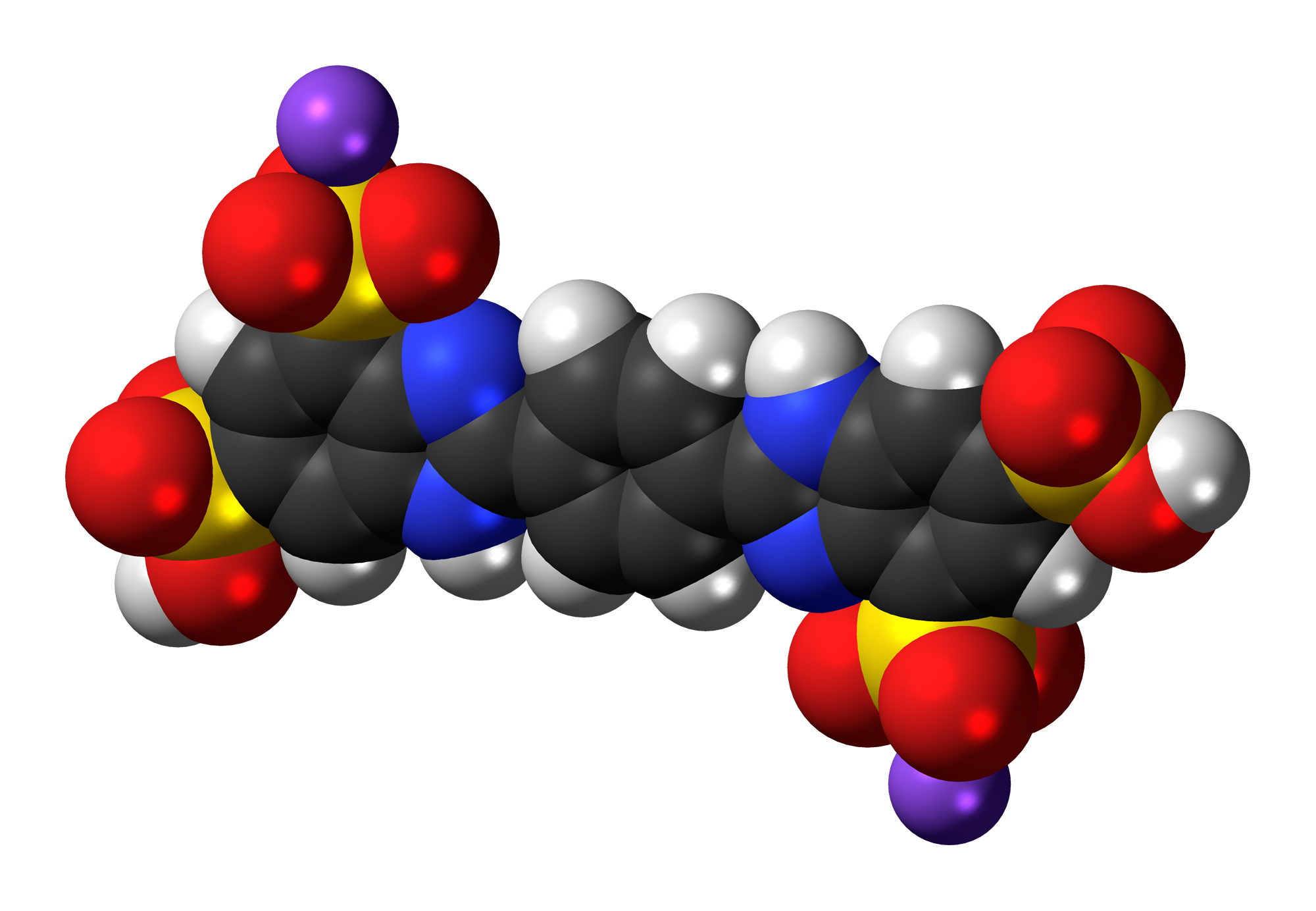

Names
- Preferred IUPAC name Disodium 2,2′-(1,4-phenylene)bis(6-sulfo-1H-1,3-benzimidazole-4-sulfonate)

Identifiers
CAS Number	180898-37-7
3D model (JSmol)	Interactive image
ChEMBL	ChEMBL2111085
ChemSpider	9333274
ECHA InfoCard	100.121.951
PubChem CID	11158166
UNII	Z99XUY03BK
CompTox Dashboard (EPA)	DTXSID001021219
- InChI: InChI=1S/C20H14N4O12S4.2Na/c25-37(26,27)11-5-13-17(15(7-11)39(31,32)33)23-19(21-13)9-1-2-10(4-3-9)20-22-14-6-12(38(28,29)30)8-16(18(14)24-20)40(34,35)36;;/h1-8H,(H,21,23)(H,22,24)(H,25,26,27)(H,28,29,30)(H,31,32,33)(H,34,35,36);;/q;2*+1/p-2 Key: GLCJMPWWQKKJQZ-UHFFFAOYSA-L; InChI=1/C20H14N4O12S4.2Na/c25-37(26,27)11-5-13-17(15(7-11)39(31,32)33)23-19(21-13)9-1-2-10(4-3-9)20-22-14-6-12(38(28,29)30)8-16(18(14)24-20)40(34,35)36;;/h1-8H,(H,21,23)(H,22,24)(H,25,26,27)(H,28,29,30)(H,31,32,33)(H,34,35,36);;/q;2*+1/p-2 Key: GLCJMPWWQKKJQZ-NUQVWONBAQ
- SMILES: C1=CC(=CC=C1C2=NC3=C(C=C(C=C3N2)S(=O)(=O)O)S(=O)(=O)[O-])C4=NC5=C(C=C(C=C5N4)S(=O)(=O)O)S(=O)(=O)[O-].[Na+].[Na+]

Properties
Chemical formula	C_{20}H_{12}N_{4}Na_{2}O_{12}S_{4}
Molar mass	674.55 g·mol^{−1}
- Except where otherwise noted, data are given for materials in their standard state (at 25 °C [77 °F], 100 kPa). verify (what is ?) Infobox references

Bisdisulizole disodium (INN/USAN, trade name Neo Heliopan AP, INCI disodium phenyl dibenzimidazole tetrasulfonate) is a water-soluble organic compound which is added to sunscreen products to absorb UVA rays. It is marketed by Symrise.

The use of bisdisulizole disodium has been approved in the European Union (since the year 2000) and other parts of the world up to 10% in sunscreen formulations, while it is not approved in the United States.
