= 3,3,5-Trimethylcyclohexanol =

Names
- Preferred IUPAC name 3,3,5-Trimethylcyclohexan-1-ol
- Other names Homomenthol

Identifiers
CAS Number	116-02-9; trans: 767-54-4; cis: 933-48-2
3D model (JSmol)	Interactive image
Beilstein Reference	2203314
ChEBI	CHEBI:59065
ChEMBL	ChEMBL3186608
ChemSpider	7997
ECHA InfoCard	100.003.748
EC Number	204-122-7; trans: 212-183-6; cis: 213-268-0
PubChem CID	8298
UNII	08CL3G94GH; cis: 3T046ESA4Q
CompTox Dashboard (EPA)	DTXSID9041815
- InChI: InChI=1S/C9H18O/c1-7-4-8(10)6-9(2,3)5-7/h7-8,10H,4-6H2,1-3H3 Key: BRRVXFOKWJKTGG-UHFFFAOYSA-N
- SMILES: CC1CC(CC(C1)(C)C)O

Properties
Chemical formula	C_{9}H_{18}O
Molar mass	142.242 g·mol^{−1}
Density	0.878 at 20 °C
Melting point	37.0 °C (98.6 °F; 310.1 K)
Boiling point	198 °C (388 °F; 471 K)

Hazards
- GHS labelling
Pictograms	(GHS07: Exclamation mark)
Signal word	Warning
Hazard statements	H315, H319, H412
Precautionary statements	P264, P273, P280, P302+P352, P305+P351+P338, P321, P332+P313, P337+P313, P362, P501
- Except where otherwise noted, data are given for materials in their standard state (at 25 °C [77 °F], 100 kPa). Infobox references

3,3,5-Trimethylcyclohexanol is a precursor to the vasodilator cyclandelate, the sunscreen component homosalate and the VP nerve agent. It can be synthesized by hydrogenation of isophorone. It has a mint flavour.

== See also ==
- Cyclandelate
- VP (nerve agent)
- Homosalate
