= Tris-biphenyl triazine =

Names
- IUPAC name 2,4,6-Tris(4-phenylphenyl)-1,3,5-triazine
- Other names Tinosorb A2B

Identifiers
CAS Number	31274-51-8
3D model (JSmol)	Interactive image
ChemSpider	9802774
ECHA InfoCard	100.105.262
EC Number	479-950-7
PubChem CID	11628027
UNII	FQK9A410YB
CompTox Dashboard (EPA)	DTXSID30185197
- InChI: InChI=1S/C39H27N3/c1-4-10-28(11-5-1)31-16-22-34(23-17-31)37-40-38(35-24-18-32(19-25-35)29-12-6-2-7-13-29)42-39(41-37)36-26-20-33(21-27-36)30-14-8-3-9-15-30/h1-27H Key: CENPSTJGQOQKKW-UHFFFAOYSA-N
- SMILES: C1=CC=C(C=C1)C2=CC=C(C=C2)C3=NC(=NC(=N3)C4=CC=C(C=C4)C5=CC=CC=C5)C6=CC=C(C=C6)C7=CC=CC=C7

Properties
Chemical formula	C_{39}H_{27}N_{3}
Molar mass	537.666 g·mol^{−1}
Appearance	White solid
Melting point	281.3 °C

Hazards
- GHS labelling
Hazard statements	H413
Precautionary statements	P273, P501
- Except where otherwise noted, data are given for materials in their standard state (at 25 °C [77 °F], 100 kPa). Infobox references

Tris-biphenyl triazine (INCI) is an organic compound used in sunscreens to absorb UVA and UVB radiation. It is marketed as Tinosorb A2B by BASF. Tris-biphenyl triazine is considered a broad-spectrum UV absorber, covering the UVA2 (320−340 nm) and UVB range (280−320 nm).

== Safety and regulation ==
Tris-biphenyl triazine is approved for use up to a maximum concentration of 10% as a UV filter in cosmetics in the EU and Australia. It is not currently recognised or approved by the FDA for use in cosmetics in the US.
