= Sulisobenzone =

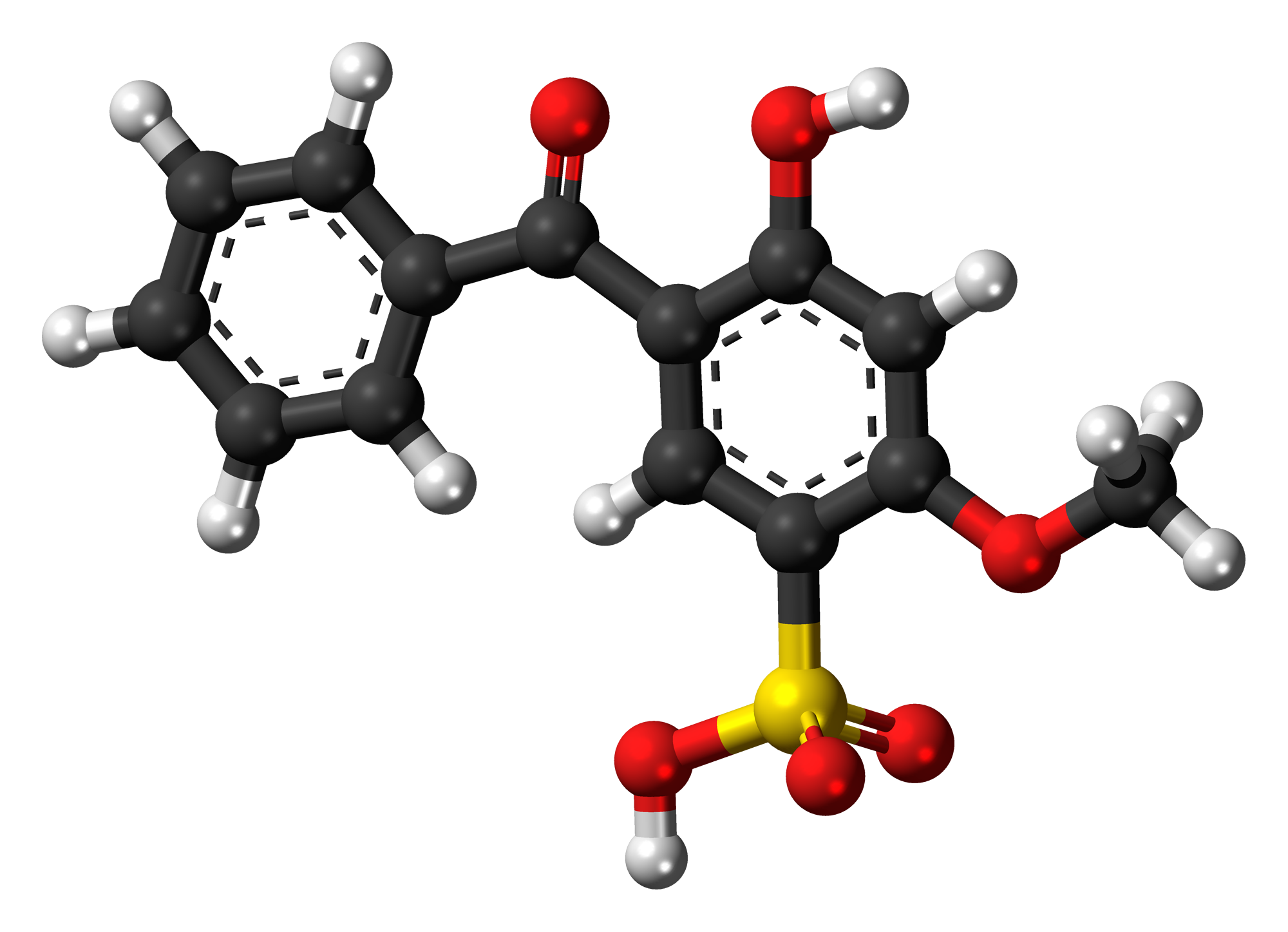

Names
- Preferred IUPAC name 5-Benzoyl-4-hydroxy-2-methoxybenzene-1-sulfonic acid
- Other names Benzophenone-4

Identifiers
CAS Number	4065-45-6
3D model (JSmol)	Interactive image
ChemSpider	18829
ECHA InfoCard	100.021.612
KEGG	D05964
PubChem CID	19988
UNII	1W6L629B4K
CompTox Dashboard (EPA)	DTXSID2042436
- InChI: InChI=1S/C14H12O6S/c1-20-12-8-11(15)10(7-13(12)21(17,18)19)14(16)9-5-3-2-4-6-9/h2-8,15H,1H3,(H,17,18,19) Key: CXVGEDCSTKKODG-UHFFFAOYSA-N; InChI=1/C14H12O6S/c1-20-12-8-11(15)10(7-13(12)21(17,18)19)14(16)9-5-3-2-4-6-9/h2-8,15H,1H3,(H,17,18,19) Key: CXVGEDCSTKKODG-UHFFFAOYAQ
- SMILES: O=S(=O)(O)c1cc(c(O)cc1OC)C(=O)c2ccccc2

Properties
Chemical formula	C_{14}H_{12}O_{6}S
Molar mass	308.31 g/mol
Appearance	Light-tan powder
Melting point	145 °C (293 °F; 418 K)
Solubility in water	1 g per 4 mL
- Except where otherwise noted, data are given for materials in their standard state (at 25 °C [77 °F], 100 kPa). verify (what is ?) Infobox references

Sulisobenzone (benzophenone-4) is an ingredient in some sunscreens which protects the skin from damage by UVB and UVA ultraviolet light.

Its sodium salt, sulisobenzone sodium, is also referred to as benzophenone-5.
