= Homosalate =

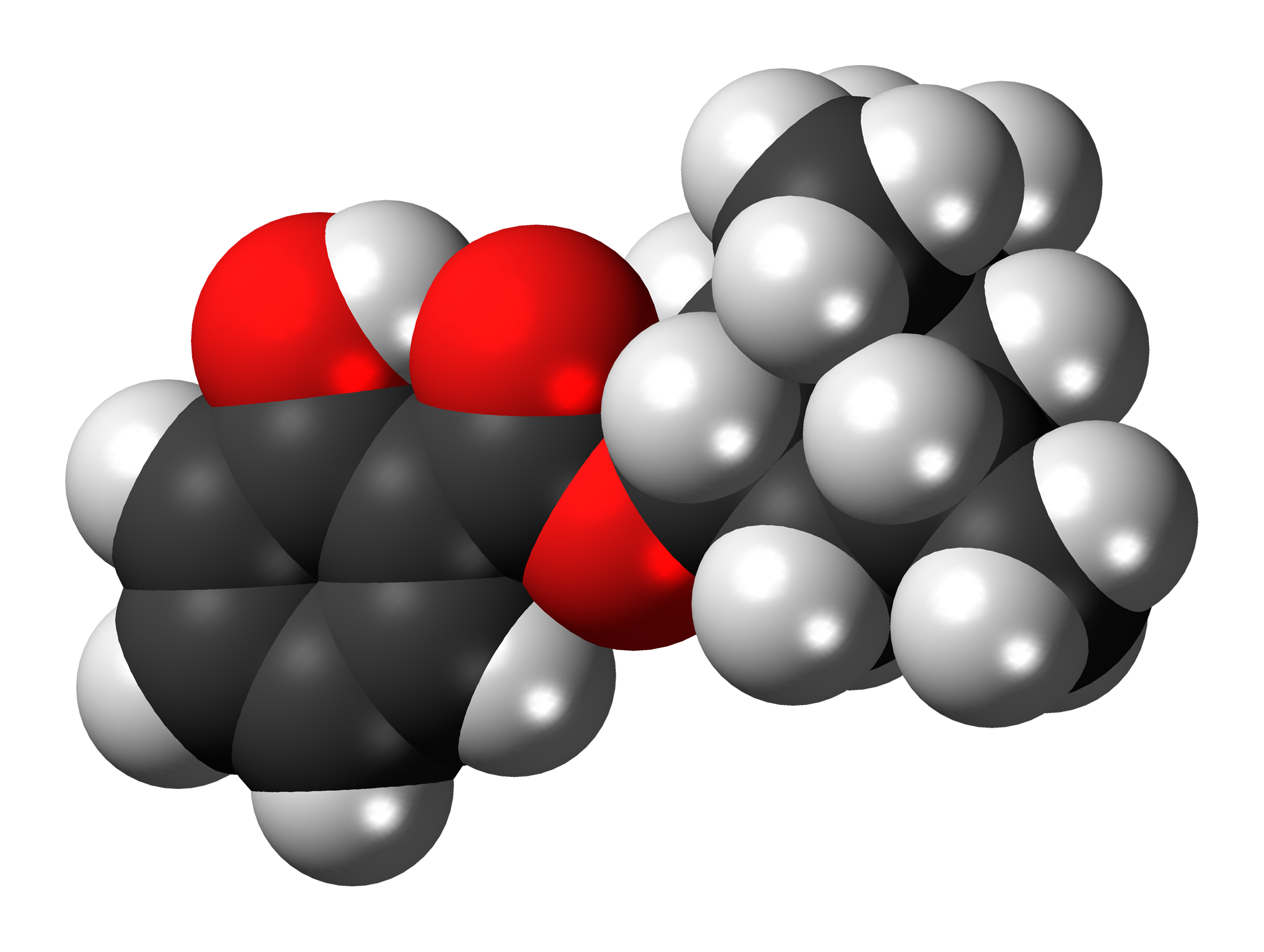

Names
- IUPAC name 3,3,5-Trimethylcyclohexyl 2-hydroxybenzoate
- Other names: Homosalate; 3,3,5-Trimethylcyclohexyl salicylate

Identifiers
CAS Number	118-56-9
3D model (JSmol)	Interactive image
ChemSpider	8059
ECHA InfoCard	100.003.874
KEGG	D04450
PubChem CID	8362
UNII	V06SV4M95S
CompTox Dashboard (EPA)	DTXSID1026241
- InChI: InChI=1S/C16H22O3/c1-11-8-12(10-16(2,3)9-11)19-15(18)13-6-4-5-7-14(13)17/h4-7,11-12,17H,8-10H2,1-3H3 Key: WSSJONWNBBTCMG-UHFFFAOYSA-N; InChI=1/C16H22O3/c1-11-8-12(10-16(2,3)9-11)19-15(18)13-6-4-5-7-14(13)17/h4-7,11-12,17H,8-10H2,1-3H3 Key: WSSJONWNBBTCMG-UHFFFAOYAJ
- SMILES: O=C(OC1CC(CC(C1)(C)C)C)c2ccccc2O

Properties
Chemical formula	C_{16}H_{22}O_{3}
Molar mass	262.349 g·mol^{−1}
Density	1.05 g/cm^{3} (20 °C)
Melting point	< −20 °C
Boiling point	181–185 °C (358–365 °F; 454–458 K)
Solubility in water	0.4 mg/L

Hazards
Flash point	171 °C (340 °F; 444 K)
- Except where otherwise noted, data are given for materials in their standard state (at 25 °C [77 °F], 100 kPa). verify (what is ?) Infobox references

Homosalate is an organic compound used in some sunscreens. It is made by the Fischer–Speier esterification of salicylic acid and 3,3,5-trimethylcyclohexanol, the latter being a hydrogenated derivative of isophorone. Contained in 45% of U.S. sunscreens, it is used as a chemical UV filter. The salicylic acid portion of the molecule absorbs ultraviolet rays with a wavelength from 295 nm to 315 nm, protecting the skin from sun damage. The hydrophobic trimethyl cyclohexyl group provides greasiness that prevents it from dissolving in water.

== Safety ==
Homosalate was identified in a court case brought by German chemical company Symrise who claimed that the ingredient used in sunscreen did not require animal testing.

Symrise lost the appeal against a European Chemicals Agency (ECHA) decision that requires the German manufacturer to test sunscreen ingredients on animals.

The Court of Justice of the European Union (CJEU) decision applies to two formerly approved ingredients used exclusively in sunscreens — UV filter homosalate and 2-ethylhexyl salicylate.

Similar to other UV filter compounds, more homosalate is absorbed into the uppermost stratum corneum (ie, the stratum disjunctum) of the face (25% of applied dose) versus back of volunteers. This amounted to approximately two to three times the amount of sunscreen that was present in the superficial stratum corneum layers of the face compared with the back. There was no homosalate detected in the urine samples or blood plasma samples of the volunteers in this study.

Homosalate has been identified as an antiandrogen (testosterone blocker) in vitro, as well as having estrogenic activity toward estrogen receptors α, and general in vitro estrogenic activity. Homosalate has been shown to be an antagonist toward androgen and estrogen receptors in vitro. Some work has shown that organic UV filters in general can present concerns.

There is no in vivo evidence of toxicity, endocrine dysfunction or adverse effects; and none of these adverse events has ever been reported to occur in humans.

An in vivo study involving repeated subcutaneous injections of homosalate at dose levels up to 1000mg/kg of body weight to juvenile female Wistar rats over three consecutive days revealed no estrogenic potential in the uterotrophic assay. Another study on immature Long–Evans rats receiving up to 892 mg/kg of body weight of homosalate in their daily diet found no estrogenic effects in vivo. Research on zebra fish also found no estrogenic effects after being continuously exposed to homosalate for 96 hours straight. The SCCS has declared there is no sufficient evidence that identifies pure homosalate as an endocrine disruptor in humans and further declared that in vivo research has confirmed that homosalate has no genotoxic, phototoxic or photosensitive effects when applied topically.
