= Iscotrizinol =

Names
- Preferred IUPAC name Bis(2-ethylhexyl) 4,4′-[(6-{[4-(tert-butylcarbamoyl)phenyl]amino}-1,3,5-triazine-2,4-diyl)bis(azanediyl)]dibenzoate
- Other names Diethylhexyl butamido triazone (INCI), Uvasorb HEB (trade name)

Identifiers
CAS Number	154702-15-5
3D model (JSmol)	Interactive image
ChemSpider	7986571
ECHA InfoCard	100.102.002
KEGG	D09714
PubChem CID	9810816
UNII	2UTZ0QC864
CompTox Dashboard (EPA)	DTXSID40870027
- InChI: InChI=1S/C44H59N7O5/c1-8-12-14-30(10-3)28-55-39(53)33-18-24-36(25-19-33)46-42-48-41(45-35-22-16-32(17-23-35)38(52)51-44(5,6)7)49-43(50-42)47-37-26-20-34(21-27-37)40(54)56-29-31(11-4)15-13-9-2/h16-27,30-31H,8-15,28-29H2,1-7H3,(H,51,52)(H3,45,46,47,48,49,50) Key: OSCJHTSDLYVCQC-UHFFFAOYSA-N; InChI=1/C44H59N7O5/c1-8-12-14-30(10-3)28-55-39(53)33-18-24-36(25-19-33)46-42-48-41(45-35-22-16-32(17-23-35)38(52)51-44(5,6)7)49-43(50-42)47-37-26-20-34(21-27-37)40(54)56-29-31(11-4)15-13-9-2/h16-27,30-31H,8-15,28-29H2,1-7H3,(H,51,52)(H3,45,46,47,48,49,50)/f/h45-47,51H; InChI=1/C44H59N7O5/c1-8-12-14-30(10-3)28-55-39(53)33-18-24-36(25-19-33)46-42-48-41(45-35-22-16-32(17-23-35)38(52)51-44(5,6)7)49-43(50-42)47-37-26-20-34(21-27-37)40(54)56-29-31(11-4)15-13-9-2/h16-27,30-31H,8-15,28-29H2,1-7H3,(H,51,52)(H3,45,46,47,48,49,50) Key: OSCJHTSDLYVCQC-UHFFFAOYAP
- SMILES: O=C(OCC(CC)CCCC)c1ccc(cc1)Nc2nc(nc(n2)Nc3ccc(C(=O)OCC(CC)CCCC)cc3)Nc4ccc(C(=O)NC(C)(C)C)cc4

Properties
Chemical formula	C_{44}H_{59}N_{7}O_{5}
Molar mass	765.981
- Except where otherwise noted, data are given for materials in their standard state (at 25 °C [77 °F], 100 kPa). verify (what is ?) Infobox references

Iscotrizinol (USAN, INCI diethylhexyl butamido triazone) is an organic compound used in sunscreens to absorb UVB and some UVA radiation with a peak protection at 310 nm. It is one of the most photostable chemical sunscreens known today with 25 hours required to lose 10% of its SPF protection ability. It is marketed as Uvasorb HEB by 3V Sigma.
