= Polysilicone-15 =

Names
- IUPAC names α-(trimethylsilyl)- ω-(trimethylsilyloxy)poly[oxy(dimethyl)silylene]- co-[oxy(methyl)(2-{4-[2,2-bis(ethoxycarbonyl)vinyl]phenoxy}- 1-methyleneethyl)silylene]- co-[oxy(methyl)(2-(4-[2,2-bis(ethoxycarbonyl)vinyl]phenoxy)prop-1-enyl)silylene]
- Other names Parsol SLX

Identifiers
| CAS Number | 207574-74-1 |
| ChemSpider | none |
| ECHA InfoCard | 100.102.446 |
| UNII | F8DRP5BB29 |

Properties
| Appearance | colorless or pale yellow liquid |
| Solubility in water | practically insoluble |
| Solubility in organic solvents of medium polarity | soluble |

Pharmacology
| Routes of administration | local |
- Except where otherwise noted, data are given for materials in their standard state (at 25 °C [77 °F], 100 kPa). verify (what is ?) Infobox references

Polysilicone-15 (INCI) is an organic compound used in hair products like shampoos, conditioners, hair sprays, pomades and color treatment products to absorb UVB radiation. In the EU, it is also approved for use in sunscreens and cosmetics. The absorption maximum is at about 310 nm. It is marketed as Parsol SLX by DSM.

The backbone chain is mainly composed of siloxane repeat units, and is of low molecular weight, so being classed as an oligomer.
