= Generally recognized as safe and effective =

Generally recognized as safe and effective (abbreviated as GRASE, GRAS/E, or GRAS/GRAE) is designation for certain old drugs that do not require prior approval from the U.S. Food and Drug Administration in order to enter the United States marketplace because they are generally recognized as safe and effective by medical professionals.

The Federal Food, Drug, and Cosmetic Act defines a "new drug", which requires prior approval, as any drug "the composition of which is such that such drug is not generally recognized, among experts qualified by scientific training and experience to evaluate the safety and effectiveness of drugs, as safe and effective for use under the conditions prescribed, recommended, or suggested in the labeling."

"Safe and effective" is always conditional on following the directions. For example, aspirin can be lethal when taken in large amounts but is approved to be GRAS/E by FDA for over-the-counter use as directed.

FDA has acknowledged the possible existence of drugs that could be considered GRAS/E that they have not found to be GRAS/E yet. As FDA stated in its 2006 Guidance on Marketed Unapproved drugs: "A product would not be considered a new drug if it is generally recognized as safe and effective (GRAS/GRAE) and has been used to a material extent and for a material time… As mentioned above, the Agency believes it is not likely that any currently marketed prescription drug product is grandfathered or is otherwise not a new drug. However, the Agency recognizes that it is at least theoretically possible."

== See also ==
- U.S. Food and Drug Administration
- Generally recognized as safe
- Grandfather clause
