= Octocrylene =

Organic compound

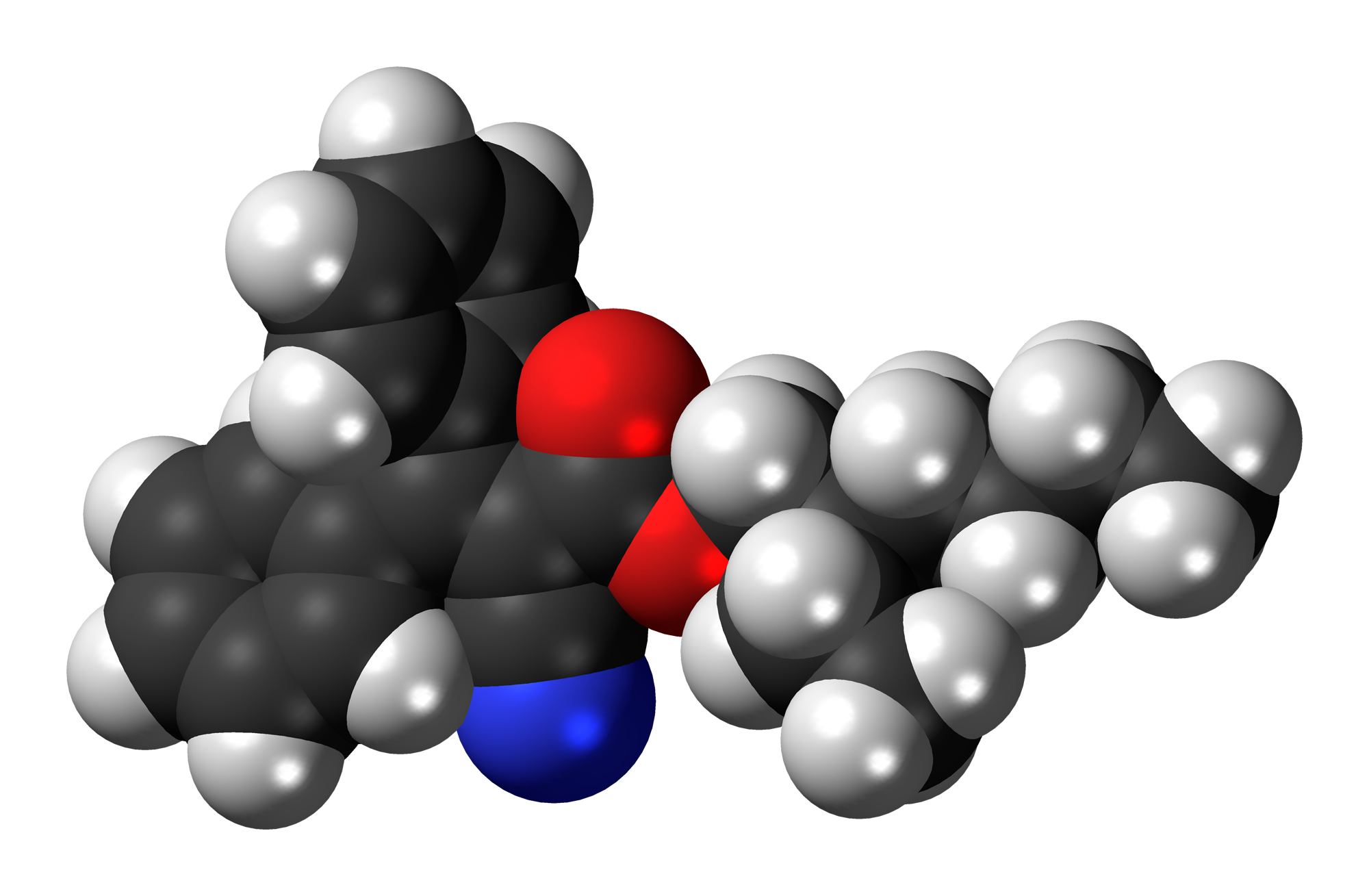

Names
- Preferred IUPAC name 2-Ethylhexyl 2-cyano-3,3-diphenylprop-2-enoate
- Other names Octocrylene; Octocrilene; Uvinul N-539

Identifiers
CAS Number	6197-30-4
3D model (JSmol)	Interactive image
ChEMBL	ChEMBL1201147
ChemSpider	21165
ECHA InfoCard	100.025.683
PubChem CID	22571
UNII	5A68WGF6WM
CompTox Dashboard (EPA)	DTXSID9025299
- InChI: InChI=1S/C24H27NO2/c1-3-5-12-19(4-2)18-27-24(26)22(17-25)23(20-13-8-6-9-14-20)21-15-10-7-11-16-21/h6-11,13-16,19H,3-5,12,18H2,1-2H3 Key: FMJSMJQBSVNSBF-UHFFFAOYSA-N; InChI=1/C24H27NO2/c1-3-5-12-19(4-2)18-27-24(26)22(17-25)23(20-13-8-6-9-14-20)21-15-10-7-11-16-21/h6-11,13-16,19H,3-5,12,18H2,1-2H3 Key: FMJSMJQBSVNSBF-UHFFFAOYAD
- SMILES: N#C/C(C(=O)OCC(CC)CCCC)=C(/c1ccccc1)c2ccccc2

Properties
Chemical formula	C_{24}H_{27}NO_{2}
Molar mass	361.48 g/mol
Density	1.05 g/cm^{3}
Melting point	14 °C (57 °F; 287 K)
Boiling point	218 °C (424 °F; 491 K) at 1.5 mmHg

Hazards
- GHS labelling
Pictograms	(GHS09: Environmental hazard)
Signal word	Warning
Hazard statements	H410, H413
Precautionary statements	P273, P391, P501
- Except where otherwise noted, data are given for materials in their standard state (at 25 °C [77 °F], 100 kPa). verify (what is ?) Infobox references

Octocrylene is an organic compound used as an ingredient in sunscreens and cosmetics. It is an ester formed by the Knoevenagel condensation of 2-ethylhexyl cyanoacetate with benzophenone. It is a viscous, oily liquid that is clear and colorless.

The extended conjugation of the acrylate portion of the molecule absorbs UVB and short-wave UVA (ultraviolet) rays with wavelengths from 280 to 320 nm, protecting the skin from direct DNA damage. The ethylhexanol portion is a fatty alcohol, adding emollient and oil-like (water resistant) properties.

== Safety ==
Octocrylene can penetrate into the skin, where it acts as a photosensitizer, resulting in an increased production of free radicals under illumination. It may also pass through the skin, into the blood stream, eventually being metabolized and excreted in urine in form of its metabolites. Octocrylene can convert to benzophenone through a retro-aldol condensation. The reaction occurs slowly over time, yielding significant concentration of benzophenone in all commercial cosmetics tested formulated with octocrylene.

In coral, octocrylene has been shown to accumulate in the form of fatty acid conjugates and probably trigger mitochondrial dysfunction.

=== Regulation ===
Palau has banned the sale and use of three reef-toxic UV filters including octocrylene in its Responsible Tourism Education Act of 2018. The United States Virgin Islands has also banned the use of sunscreens containing octocrylene, requiring that all visitors use "non-nano mineral sunscreen" containing zinc oxide and titanium dioxide.
