= Oxybenzone =

- Oxybenzone

Names
- Preferred IUPAC name (2-Hydroxy-4-methoxyphenyl)(phenyl)methanone
- Other names Oxybenzone; Benzophenone-3; 2-Hydroxy-4-methoxybenzophenone

Identifiers
CAS Number	131-57-7
3D model (JSmol)	Interactive image
ChEBI	CHEBI:34283
ChEMBL	ChEMBL1625
ChemSpider	4471
DrugBank	DB01428
ECHA InfoCard	100.004.575
KEGG	D05309
PubChem CID	4632
UNII	95OOS7VE0Y
CompTox Dashboard (EPA)	DTXSID3022405
- InChI: InChI=1S/C14H12O3/c1-17-11-7-8-12(13(15)9-11)14(16)10-5-3-2-4-6-10/h2-9,15H,1H3 Key: DXGLGDHPHMLXJC-UHFFFAOYSA-N; InChI=1/C14H12O3/c1-17-11-7-8-12(13(15)9-11)14(16)10-5-3-2-4-6-10/h2-9,15H,1H3 Key: DXGLGDHPHMLXJC-UHFFFAOYAX
- SMILES: O=C(c1ccc(OC)cc1O)c2ccccc2

Properties
Chemical formula	C_{14}H_{12}O_{3}
Molar mass	228.247 g·mol^{−1}
Appearance	pale yellow crystals
Density	1.20 g cm^{−3}
Melting point	62 to 65 °C (144 to 149 °F; 335 to 338 K)
Boiling point	224 to 227 °C (435 to 441 °F; 497 to 500 K)
Acidity (pK_{a})	7.6 (H_{2}O)

Hazards
NFPA 704 (fire diamond)	1 1 0
Flash point	140.5 °C (284.9 °F; 413.6 K)
- Lethal dose or concentration (LD, LC)
LD_{50} (median dose)	>12800 mg/kg (oral in rats)

Pharmacology
Legal status	As sunscreen ingredient it is banned in Thailand, Palau and Hawaii
- Except where otherwise noted, data are given for materials in their standard state (at 25 °C [77 °F], 100 kPa). verify (what is ?) Infobox references

Oxybenzone or benzophenone-3 or BP-3 (trade names Milestab 9, Eusolex 4360, Escalol 567, KAHSCREEN BZ-3) is an organic compound belonging to the class of aromatic ketones known as benzophenones. It takes the form of pale-yellow crystals that are readily soluble in most organic solvents. It is widely used in sunscreen formulations, plastics, toys, furniture finishes, and other products to limit UV degradation. In nature, it can be found in various flowering plants (angiosperms). The compound was first synthesised in Germany by chemists König and Kostanecki in 1906.

The use of oxybenzone as sunscreen ingredient is currently under scrutiny by the scientific community due to controversies about the molecule's environmental impact and safety profile (see section below). As a result, sunscreens containing oxybenzone have been banned from sale in Hawaii, Palau, and Thailand.

== Structure and electronic structure ==
Being a conjugated molecule, oxybenzone absorbs light at lower energies than many aromatic molecules. As in related compounds, the hydroxyl group is hydrogen bonded to the ketone. This interaction contributes to oxybenzone's light-absorption properties. At low temperatures, however, it is possible to observe both the phosphorescence and the triplet-triplet absorption spectrum. At 175 K the triplet lifetime is 24 ns. The short lifetime has been attributed to a fast intramolecular hydrogen transfer between the oxygen of the C=O and the OH.

== Production ==
Oxybenzone is produced by the Friedel-Crafts reaction of benzoyl chloride with 3-methoxyphenol.

== Uses ==
Oxybenzone is used in plastics as an ultraviolet light absorber and stabilizer. It is used, along with other benzophenones, in sunscreens, hair sprays, and cosmetics because they help prevent potential damage from sunlight exposure. It is also found, as a stabilizer in concentrations up to 1%, in nail polishes. Oxybenzone can also be used as a photostabilizer for synthetic resins. This substance can leach from food packaging, and is widely used as photo-initiators to activate a chemical that dries ink faster. Despite its photoprotective qualities, much controversy surrounds oxybenzone because of possible negative hormonal and photoallergenic effects, leading many countries to regulate use in sunscreen products.

=== Sunscreen ===
Oxybenzone provides a broad-spectrum ultraviolet coverage which includes UVB and short-wave UVA rays. As a photoprotective agent, it has an absorption profile spanning from 270 to 350 nm with absorption peaks at 288 and 350 nm.

Due to toxicity and environmental concerns, the percentage of sunscreen products on the market containing oxybenzone in the USA dropped to 13% in 2023 from 60% in 2019. Some brands market their sunscreens as "oxybenzone free" due to the generally negative perception of benzophenones by both the consuming public and scientific researchers.

== Safety ==
=== In vivo studies ===
The incidence of oxybenzone causing skin eruptions is extremely uncommon, however, oxybenzone has been associated with rare allergic reactions triggered by sun exposure. In a study of 82 patients with photoallergic contact dermatitis, just over one quarter showed photoallergic reactions to oxybenzone. Evidence points to oxybenzone having contact allergen effects. Oxybenzone is allegedly the most common allergen found in sunscreens.

In a 2008 study of participants ages 6 and up, oxybenzone was detected in 96.8% of urine samples. Humans can absorb anywhere from 0.4% to 8.7% of oxybenzone after one topical application of sunscreen, as measured in urine excretions. This number can increase after multiple applications over the same period of time. Because oxybenzone is the least lipophilic of the three most common UV filters, it is the least likely to end up trapped in the stratum corneum and the most likely to be absorbed and metabolized.

When applied topically, UV filters, such as oxybenzone, are absorbed through the skin, metabolized, and excreted primarily through the urine. The method of biotransformation, the process by which a foreign compound is chemically transformed to form a metabolite, was determined by Okereke and colleagues through oral and dermal administration of oxybenzone to rats. The scientists analyzed blood, urine, feces, and tissue samples and found three metabolites: 2,4-dihydroxybenzophenone (DHB), 2,2-dihydroxy-4-methoxybenzophenone (DHMB) and 2,3,4-trihydroxybenzophenone (THB). To form DHB the methoxy functional group undergoes O-dealkylation; to form THB the same ring is hydroxylated. Ring B in oxybenzone is hydroxylated to form DHMB.

A study done in 2004 measured the levels of oxybenzone and its metabolites in urine. After topical application to human volunteers, results revealed that up to 1% of the applied dose was found in the urine. The major metabolite detected was DHB and very small amounts of THB were found. By utilizing the Ames test in Salmonella typhimurium strains, DHB was determined to be nonmutagenic. In 2019, the U.S. Food and Drug Administration (FDA) noted in their recommendations for future study that, "While research indicates that some topical drugs can be absorbed into the body through the skin, this does not mean these drugs are unsafe." Oxybenzone can also occur as a natural product.

== Environmental effects ==
Studies have shown possible links between oxybenzone exposure and mortality in coral larvae, coral bleaching, and to genetic damage in marine invertebrates. However, some of these studies have been criticised for not having control groups or representing real-world conditions. Nevertheless, these have led to the ban of oxybenzone-containing sunscreen in many areas such as Palau, Hawaii, nature reserves in Mexico, Bonaire, the Marshall Islands, the United States Virgin Islands, Thailand's marine natural parks, the Northern Mariana Islands, and Aruba.

== Health and environmental regulation ==
=== Aruba ===
Aruba banned the use of oxybenzone in sunscreens due to environmental concerns in 2019.

=== Australia ===
As of 2023, the maximum concentration of oxybenzone in a sunscreen cannot exceed 10% according to the TGA (Therapeutic Goods Administration).

=== Bonaire ===
As of 2019 Bonaire banned oxybenzone due to coral toxicity concerns, with regards to coral larvae

=== Canada ===
Revised as of 2012, Health Canada allows oxybenzone for cosmetic use up to 6%.

=== European Union ===
The Scientific Committee on Consumer Safety (SCCS) of the European Commission evaluated oxybenzone (benzophenone-3) in 2021. Under Commission Regulation (EU) 2022/1176, it is permitted as a UV filter at restricted concentrations: up to 6% in face, hand, and lip products, and up to 2.2% in body products (and 0.5% to protect product formulation). However, following a decade-long evaluation, the European Chemicals Agency (ECHA) officially identified benzophenone-3 as an endocrine disruptor for both human health and the environment in September 2025. Stricter regulatory controls under the EU Classification, Labelling and Packaging (CLP) regulation are expected to be formally proposed in 2026.

=== Japan ===
Revised as of 2001, the Ministry of Health, Labour, and Welfare notification allows oxybenzone for cosmetic use up to 5%.

=== Mexico ===
Nature Reserves across Mexico have banned the usage of sunscreens containing Oxybenzone

=== Palau ===
The Palau government has signed a law that restricts the sale and use of sunscreen and skincare products that contain oxybenzone, and nine other chemicals. The ban came into force in 2020.

=== Sweden ===
The Swedish Research Council has concluded that sunscreens containing oxybenzone are unsuitable for use in young children, as children under the age of two lack the fully developed enzymes necessary to metabolize and break the chemical down. Despite this clinical finding, no formal national regulations or bans have been implemented in Sweden as a result of the study.

=== Thailand ===
Thailand has prohibited sunscreens containing chemicals harmful to corals, including oxybenzone, in all its marine national parks. This decision was driven by evidence highlighting the detrimental effects of certain sunscreen ingredients on coral larvae, reproduction, and inducing reef bleaching. Violators face fines up to 100,000 baht (£2,100), although enforcement methods remain unspecified.

=== United Kingdom ===
In January 2026, restrictions were introduced on the amount of Oxybenzone permitted within cosmetic products: up to 6% in face, hand, and lip products; up to 2.2% in skin (body) products and 0.5% for all other cosmetic products (or to protect product formulation). Existing cosmetic products were permitted to remain available on the market until the end of 21st July 2026.

=== United States ===
In 2021, the U.S. FDA issued a proposed order requesting additional safety data for several organic UV filters, including oxybenzone. Because this specific data is still lacking, the FDA currently classifies oxybenzone as a Category III ingredient—meaning it is not GRASE (Generally Recognized As Safe and Effective) due to insufficient data. However, it remains legally approved for use in sunscreen formulations while the FDA awaits further safety studies from manufacturers.

At the state and local level, the Hawaii State Legislature has made the sale of sunscreens containing oxybenzone illegal since 2021 due to its environmental effects, such as mortality in developing coral, coral bleaching, and genetic damage to marine organisms. Other U.S. territories, including the United States Virgin Islands (effective 2020) and the Northern Mariana Islands, have also enacted strict bans on the ingredient to protect local reef ecosystems.

Key West also attempted to ban the sale of sunscreens containing oxybenzone and octinoxate, which was to be effective January 1, 2021. However, this local ordinance was preemptively superseded by the Florida State Legislature via Senate Bill 172, which prohibits local governments from regulating over-the-counter proprietary drugs and cosmetics. The state statute became effective July 1, 2020, legally invalidating the Key West ban.
