= Enzacamene =

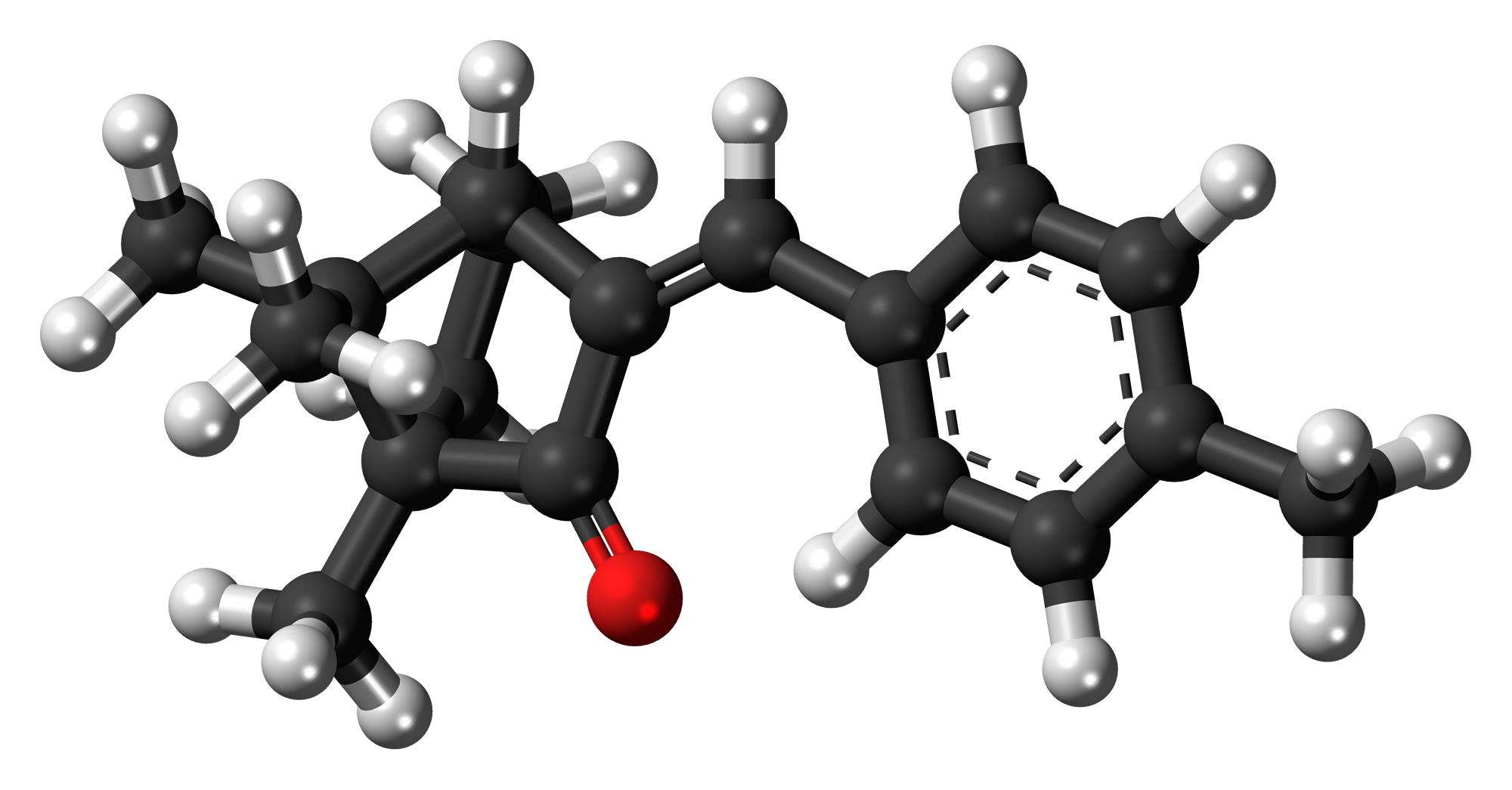

Names
- IUPAC name (3E)-1,7,7-Trimethyl-3-[(4-methylphenyl)methylene]-2-norbornanone
- Other names 4-Methylbenzylidene camphor 3-(4-Methylbenzylidene)bornan-2-one; 3-(4-Methylbenzylidene)-dl-camphor

Identifiers
CAS Number	36861-47-9
3D model (JSmol)	Interactive image
Abbreviations	4-MBC
ChemSpider	4939160
ECHA InfoCard	100.048.386
EC Number	253-242-6
PubChem CID	6434217
UNII	8I3XWY40L9
CompTox Dashboard (EPA)	DTXSID201348972 DTXSID8047896, DTXSID201348972
- InChI: InChI=1S/C18H22O/c1-12-5-7-13(8-6-12)11-14-15-9-10-18(4,16(14)19)17(15,2)3/h5-8,11,15H,9-10H2,1-4H3/b14-11+ Key: HEOCBCNFKCOKBX-SDNWHVSQSA-N; InChI=1/C18H22O/c1-12-5-7-13(8-6-12)11-14-15-9-10-18(4,16(14)19)17(15,2)3/h5-8,11,15H,9-10H2,1-4H3/b14-11+ Key: HEOCBCNFKCOKBX-SDNWHVSQBW
- SMILES: O=C2\C(=C\c1ccc(cc1)C)C3CCC2(C)C3(C)C

Properties
Chemical formula	C_{18}H_{22}O
Molar mass	254.373 g·mol^{−1}
Appearance	White crystalline powder
Melting point	66 to 69 °C (151 to 156 °F; 339 to 342 K)
Solubility in water	Insoluble

Hazards
- GHS labelling
Pictograms	(GHS09: Environmental hazard)
Signal word	Warning
Hazard statements	H410
Precautionary statements	P273, P391, P501

Pharmacology
Legal status	Banned in the European Union, United Kingdom, and China. Banned in Palau nationwide. Banned in national parks in Thailand. Not approved in the United States or Japan.
- Except where otherwise noted, data are given for materials in their standard state (at 25 °C [77 °F], 100 kPa). verify (what is ?) Infobox references

Enzacamene (INN; also known as 4-methylbenzylidene camphor or 4-MBC) is an organic camphor derivative that is used in the cosmetic industry for its ability to protect the skin against UV, specifically UV B radiation. As such, it is used in sunscreen lotions and other skincare products claiming a SPF value.

== Mechanism ==
All camphor-derived sunscreens dissipate photon energy by cis-trans isomerisation. However, for enzacamene, the quantum yield for this isomerization is only between 0.13 and 0.3. This low quantum yield means that other photochemical processes are also occurring, which may contribute to its limited photostability compared to other UV filters.

== Endocrine disruptor ==
Studies have extensively documented that enzacamene acts as an endocrine disruptor. The scientific evidence demonstrates both estrogenic and thyroid-disrupting effects:

=== Estrogenic effects ===
Multiple peer-reviewed studies have demonstrated that 4-MBC exhibits estrogenic activity through estrogen receptor binding and activation. 4-MBC activates both estrogen receptor alpha (ERα) and estrogen receptor beta (ERβ) in human and rat cells, with preferential binding to ERβ. The compound stimulates estrogen-responsive alkaline phosphatase activity in human endometrial cells and shows measurable transactivation at concentrations above 1 μM.

4-MBC and the related compound 3-benzylidene camphor displace estradiol from estrogen receptors, particularly ERβ, with 4-MBC showing an IC_{50} of 35.3 μM for ERβ binding. The compound stimulates MCF-7 breast cancer cell proliferation with an EC_{50} of 3.9 μM.

Developmental exposure studies found that prenatal and postnatal exposure to 4-MBC in rats altered expression of estrogen target genes including ERα, progesterone receptor, and insulin-like growth factor-I in the uterus. Sex- and region-specific alterations in estrogen target gene regulation in the brain following developmental 4-MBC exposure.

=== Thyroid effects ===
Research has demonstrated that 4-MBC significantly disrupts thyroid function. 4-MBC treatment in rats results in decreased serum T_{4} levels and increased TSH levels, indicating thyroid disruption. 4-MBC inhibits T_{4} production while stimulating TSH release, effects that are distinct from estradiol treatment.

A comprehensive study presented at the European Congress of Endocrinology demonstrated that 4-MBC causes effects comparable to primary hypothyroidism in rats. At concentrations ≥33 mg/kg, 4-MBC significantly elevated TSH levels while T_{4} levels decreased and T_{3} levels remained unchanged - a pattern typical of early hypothyroidism. The study found increased thyroid gland weights and altered expression of thyroid-related genes including TSH receptor, sodium-iodide symporter, and thyroid peroxidase.

== Regulatory status and bans ==
=== European Union ban ===
The European Union has completely banned 4-MBC in all cosmetic products through Commission Regulation (EU) 2024/996, adopted on 3 April 2024. The Scientific Committee on Consumer Safety (SCCS) concluded in their 2022 opinion that there is insufficient data to evaluate potential genotoxicity and sufficient evidence that 4-MBC acts as an endocrine disruptor affecting both thyroid and estrogen systems.

Implementation timeline:

- 1 May 2025: Products containing 4-MBC cannot be placed on the EU market
- 1 May 2026: Products containing 4-MBC cannot be made available on the EU market

The compound has been moved from Annex VI (permitted UV filters) to Annex II (prohibited substances) as entry 1730.

=== United Kingdom ===
In May 2025, the UK Scientific Advisory Group on Chemical Safety (SAG-CS) published Opinion 18: 4-Methylbenzylidene Camphor as a UV Filter in Cosmetic Products, concluding that 4-MBC cannot be considered safe for use in cosmetic products at any concentration due to concerns about endocrine-disrupting properties and genotoxicity.

On 15 January 2026, the UK Government laid before Parliament the Cosmetic Products Regulation (EC) No 1223/2009 (Restriction of Chemical Substances) (Amendment and Transitional Provisions) Regulations 2026 (SI 2026/23), adding 4-MBC to Annex II of the UK Cosmetics Regulation as a fully prohibited substance. From 15 July 2026, products containing 4-MBC can no longer be placed on the Great Britain market; products already on the market may continue to be sold until 14 January 2027. Northern Ireland continues to follow EU cosmetics legislation under the Windsor Framework. The UK notified the World Trade Organization of the draft regulation on 31 October 2025 under notification G/TBT/N/GBR/107.

=== China ===
On 12 January 2026, China's National Medical Products Administration (NMPA) issued Announcement No. 6 of 2026, incorporating revised standards into the Cosmetic Safety Technical Standards (STSC 2015). 4-MBC was removed from the list of permitted UV filters and added to the list of prohibited substances, aligning China's regulatory position with the EU ban. Prior to this update, 4-MBC had been permitted in Chinese cosmetics at a maximum concentration of 4%.

=== Denmark ===
In 2001, following the publication of a Swiss study raising concerns about the endocrine-disrupting properties of 4-MBC, the Danish Environmental Protection Agency (Miljostyrelsen) applied the precautionary principle and proposed a voluntary warning label for all sunscreens containing 4-MBC, advising that they should not be used on children under the age of 12. Danish retailers subsequently reached a mutual agreement to discontinue the sale of all sunscreen products containing 4-MBC. Although this was not a formal legislative ban, 4-MBC has been effectively absent from the Danish market since the early 2000s.

In 2013, the Danish Centre on Endocrine Disruptors (CeHoS), funded by the Danish EPA, published a comprehensive assessment confirming that 4-MBC demonstrated endocrine disrupting properties in both in vitro and in vivo studies, with effects on the estrogenic and thyroid hormone systems. The Danish EPA further published Survey and health assessment of UV filters (Survey No. 142, 2015), which confirmed that 4-MBC was no longer found in cosmetic products on the Danish market, though biomonitoring data continued to detect its metabolites in the Danish population.

=== Other countries ===
- United States: Not approved by the FDA as a sunscreen active ingredient.
- Japan: Not permitted.
- Palau: Banned nationwide under the Responsible Tourism Education Act of 2018 (RPPL #10-30), effective 1 January 2020, as one of ten reef-toxic sunscreen chemicals. Banned products are confiscated upon entry.
- Thailand: Banned in all national parks since August 2021 by the Department of National Parks, Wildlife and Plant Conservation, as one of four chemicals harmful to coral reefs. Violators face fines of up to 100,000 Baht.

==== Still permitted ====
- Canada: Permitted at concentrations up to 4%.
- Australia: Still permitted in therapeutic sunscreens.

== Safety concerns ==
The SCCS has identified multiple safety concerns:

- Insufficient genotoxicity data to exclude mutagenic potential
- Endocrine disruption affecting thyroid and estrogen systems
- Systemic absorption through skin with detection in plasma and urine

== See also ==
- Xenoestrogen
