= Bisoctrizole =

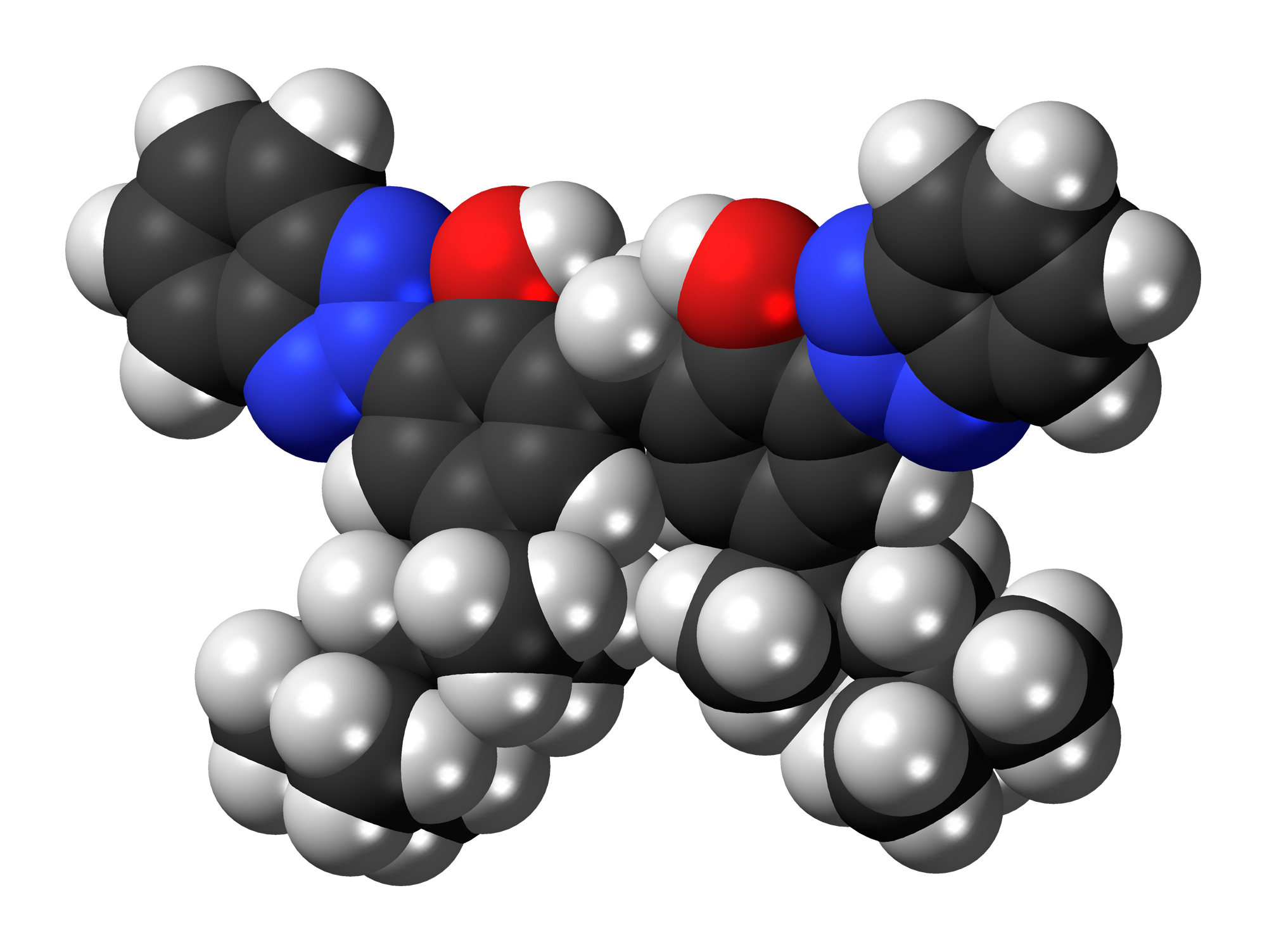

Names
- Preferred IUPAC name 2,2′-Methylenebis[6-(2H-1,2,3-benzotriazol-2-yl)-4-(2,4,4-trimethylpentan-2-yl)phenol]
- Other names UV-360

Identifiers
CAS Number	103597-45-1
3D model (JSmol)	Interactive image
ChEMBL	ChEMBL2104957
ChemSpider	2808671
ECHA InfoCard	100.100.550
PubChem CID	3571576
UNII	8NT850T0YS
CompTox Dashboard (EPA)	DTXSID2046703
- InChI: InChI=1S/C41H50N6O2/c1-38(2,3)24-40(7,8)28-20-26(36(48)34(22-28)46-42-30-15-11-12-16-31(30)43-46)19-27-21 -29(41(9,10)25-39(4,5)6)23-35(37(27)49)47-44-32-17-13-14-18-33(32)45-47/h11-18,20-23,48-49H,19,24-25H2,1-10H3 Key: FQUNFJULCYSSOP-UHFFFAOYSA-N; InChI=1/C41H50N6O2/c1-38(2,3)24-40(7,8)28-20-26(36(48)34(22-28)46-42-30-15-11-12-16-31(30)43-46)19-27-21- 29(41(9,10)25-39(4,5)6)23-35(37(27)49)47-44-32-17-13-14-18-33(32)45-47/h11-18,20-23,48-49H,19,24-25H2,1-10H3 Key: FQUNFJULCYSSOP-UHFFFAOYAP
- SMILES: n1c6ccccc6nn1c2cc(cc(c2O)Cc5cc(cc(n3nc4ccccc4n3)c5O)C(C)(C)CC(C)(C)C)C(C)(C)CC(C)(C)C

Properties
Chemical formula	C_{41}H_{50}N_{6}O_{2}
Molar mass	658.88 g/mol
Melting point	195.7 °C (384.3 °F; 468.8 K)
- Except where otherwise noted, data are given for materials in their standard state (at 25 °C [77 °F], 100 kPa). verify (what is ?) Infobox references

Bisoctrizole (INN/USAN, INCI methylene bis-benzotriazolyl tetramethylbutylphenol, marketed as Tinosorb M, Parsol Max, Eversorb M, and Milestab 360, among others) is a phenolic benzotriazole that is added to sunscreens to absorb UV rays. It is a broad-spectrum ultraviolet radiation absorber, absorbing UVB as well as UVA rays. It also reflects and scatters UV.

Bisoctrizole is what is termed a hybrid UV absorber, which has been described as an organic UV filter produced in microfine organic particles (< 200 nm), like microfine zinc oxide and titanium dioxide. Where other organic UV absorbers dissolved in either the oily or aqueous phases, bisoctrizole dissolves poorly in both.

Hence, bisoctrizole is formulated in sunscreen preparations as a 50% suspension, the absorber added to the water phase, and mineral micropigments usually added to the oil phase. The bisoctrizole particles are stabilized by the surfactant decyl glucoside. The compound shows very little photodegradation, and has a stabilizing effect on other UV absorbers, octyl methoxycinnamate (octinoxate) in particular.

In primary research reports, bisoctrizole has been reported to minimally penetrate skin, and has been described as lacking estrogenic effects in vitro.

Bisoctrizole has not yet been approved by the U.S. Food and Drug Administration (FDA), but is approved in the EU and other parts of the world.
