= Ethylhexyl triazone =

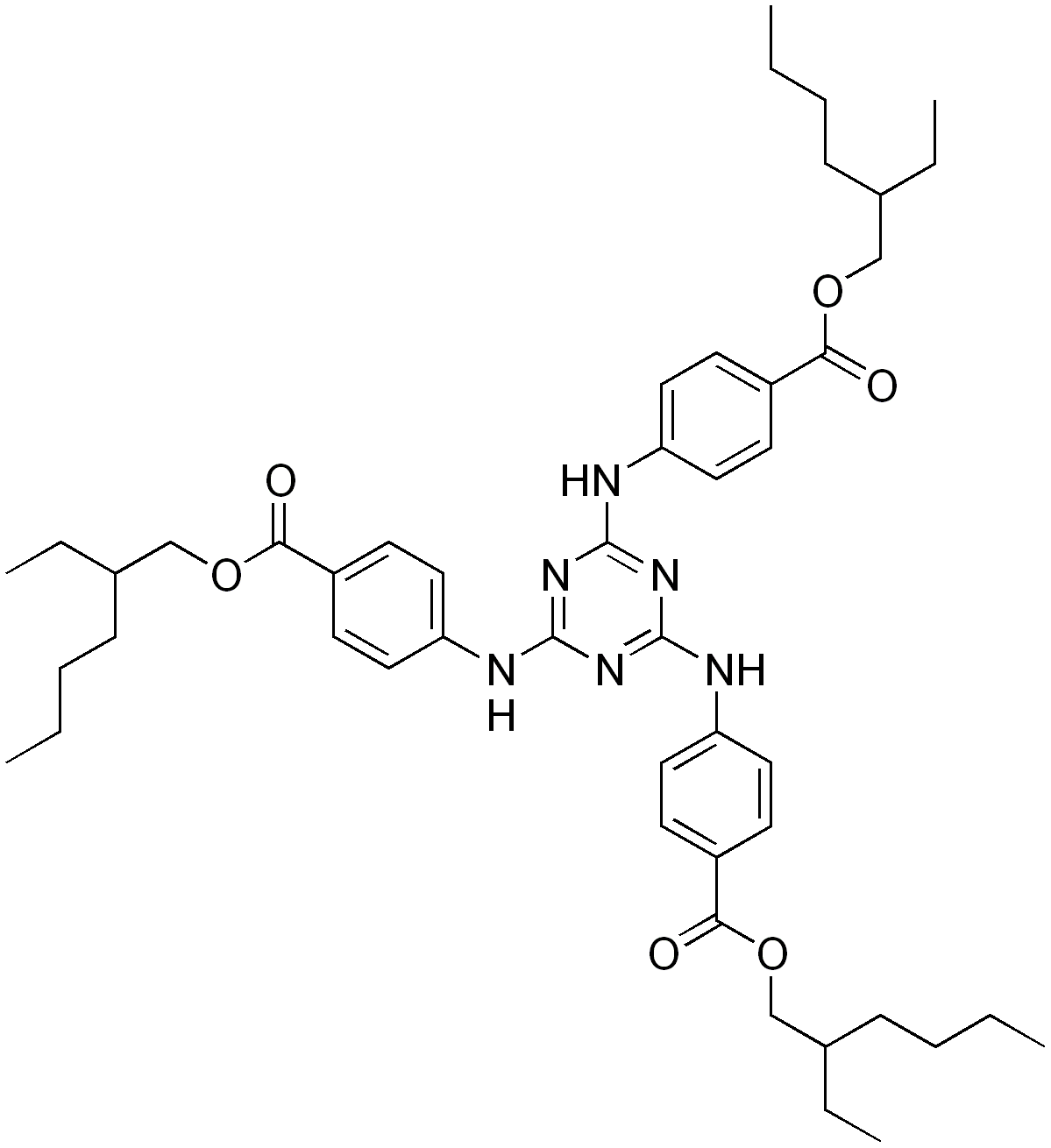

Names
- IUPAC name 4-[[4,6-bis[[4-(2-ethylhexoxy-oxomethyl)phenyl]amino]-1,3,5-triazin-2-yl]amino]benzoic acid 2-ethylhexyl ester
- Other names Octyl triazone

Identifiers
CAS Number	88122-99-0
3D model (JSmol)	Interactive image
ChemSpider	140022
ECHA InfoCard	100.100.393
PubChem CID	159201
UNII	XQN8R9SAK4
CompTox Dashboard (EPA)	DTXSID90868994
- InChI: InChI=1S/C48H66N6O6/c1-7-13-16-34(10-4)31-58-43(55)37-19-25-40(26-20-37)49-46-52-47(50-41- 27-21-38(22-28-41)44(56)59-32-35(11-5)17-14-8-2)54-48(53-46)51-42-29-23-39(24-30-42)45(57)60-33- 36(12-6)18-15-9-3/h19-30,34-36H,7-18,31-33H2,1-6H3,(H3,49,50,51,52,53,54) Key: JGUMTYWKIBJSTN-UHFFFAOYSA-N; InChI=1/C48H66N6O6/c1-7-13-16-34(10-4)31-58-43(55)37-19-25-40(26-20-37)49-46-52-47(50-41-27-2 1-38(22-28-41)44(56)59-32-35(11-5)17-14-8-2)54-48(53-46)51-42-29-23-39(24-30-42)45(57)60-33-36(12- 6)18-15-9-3/h19-30,34-36H,7-18,31-33H2,1-6H3,(H3,49,50,51,52,53,54) Key: JGUMTYWKIBJSTN-UHFFFAOYAV
- SMILES: O=C(OCC(CC)CCCC)c1ccc(cc1)Nc2nc(nc(n2)Nc3ccc(C(=O)OCC(CC)CCCC)cc3)Nc4ccc(C(=O)OCC(CC)CCCC)cc4

Properties
Chemical formula	C_{48}H_{66}N_{6}O_{6}
Molar mass	823.07 g/mol
- Except where otherwise noted, data are given for materials in their standard state (at 25 °C [77 °F], 100 kPa). verify (what is ?) Infobox references

Ethylhexyl triazone (INCI) is an organic compound used in sunscreens to absorb UVB radiation. It is marketed as Uvinul T 150 by BASF and Parsol EHT by DSM-Firmenich. Ethylhexyl triazone has an absorption maximum of 314 nm.
