= Diethylamino hydroxybenzoyl hexyl benzoate =

Names
- Preferred IUPAC name Hexyl 2-[4-(diethylamino)-2-hydroxybenzoyl]benzoate
- Other names Uvinul A Plus

Identifiers
CAS Number	302776-68-7
3D model (JSmol)	Interactive image
ChemSpider	8286957
ECHA InfoCard	100.103.916
PubChem CID	10111431
UNII	ANQ870JD20
CompTox Dashboard (EPA)	DTXSID60184370
- InChI: InChI=1S/C24H31NO4/c1-4-7-8-11-16-29-24(28)20-13-10-9-12-19(20)23(27)21-15-14-18(17-22(21)26)25(5-2)6-3/h9-10,12-15,17,26H,4-8,11,16H2,1-3H3 Key: FDATWRLUYRHCJE-UHFFFAOYSA-N; InChI=1/C24H31NO4/c1-4-7-8-11-16-29-24(28)20-13-10-9-12-19(20)23(27)21-15-14-18(17-22(21)26)25(5-2)6-3/h9-10,12-15,17,26H,4-8,11,16H2,1-3H3 Key: FDATWRLUYRHCJE-UHFFFAOYAR
- SMILES: CCCCCCOC(=O)C1=CC=CC=C1C(=O)C2=C(C(=CC=C2)N(CC)CC)O

Properties
Chemical formula	C_{24}H_{31}NO_{4}
Molar mass	397.515 g·mol^{−1}
- Except where otherwise noted, data are given for materials in their standard state (at 25 °C [77 °F], 100 kPa). verify (what is ?) Infobox references

Diethylamino hydroxybenzoyl hexyl benzoate (INCI) is an organic compound used in sunscreens to absorb UVA radiation. It is marketed as Parsol DHHB by DSM and as Uvinul A Plus by BASF. DHHB has an absorption maximum of 354 nm. DHHB has excellent photostability and compatibility with other UV absorbers and other cosmetic ingredients.

The European Commission Scientific Committee on Consumer Safety (SCCS) has expressed concerns about di-n-hexyl phthalate contamination from manufacture and recommended a maximum safe level of 260 parts per million in DHHB for suncreams. They further recommended that a trace level below 1 ppm should be the target for manufacturers as the contamination is avoidable. Although DHHB is a safe sunscreen ingredient, di-n-hexyl phtalate has been on the European Chemicals Agency list of Substances of Very High Concern since 2013.

== Synthesis ==
DHHB is produced by a reaction between 3-hydroxy-N,N-diethylaniline and phthalic anhydride, followed by esterification with 1-hexanol.

== Regulation ==
DHHB has been approved for the use in sunscreens in the European Union since 2005 with a maximum concentration of 10% and is also approved in South America, Mexico, Japan and Taiwan. In the United States it can be used for product protection.
