= List of large sensor interchangeable-lens video cameras =

List of digital video cameras with an image sensor larger than 2/3 inch and producing video in a horizontal resolution equal or higher than 1920 pixels.

== Digital video cameras ==
Brand	Camera	Sensor size	Crop factor	Lens Mount	Recording media	Codec	Maximum video resolution	ISO range	Dynamic range (at native/peak ISO)	Shutter type	Anamorphic shooting	Internal filters	Frame rate(s^{−1})
Arri	Alexa; Alexa Plus	23.76 x 13.37 mm	1.52	Arri PL	SxS card, T-link recorder (optional XR module upgrade)	12-bit 4444 ProRes, 10-bit 4:4:4 DNxHD (SxS card); 12-bit ARRIRAW (T-link recorder or XR drive)	2048 x 1152 (ProRes/DNxHD codecs to SxS card); 2880 x 1620 (ARRIRAW to external recorders or XR drive); 3164 x 1778 (ProRes with XR module upgrade)	160 - 3200 (800 native)	14.5 stops (Log C, -6.7, +7.8)	Rolling	None by default, 2x and 1.33x desqueeze with license	Optical low pass, IR, UV	0,75 - 60 (default), 0.75 - 120 (with high speed license)
Arri	Alexa Plus 4:3; Alexa M	23.76 x 17.82 mm	1.52	Arri PL	SxS card, T-link recorder (optional XR module upgrade)	12-bit 4444 ProRes, 10-bit 4:4:4 DNxHD (SxS card); 12-bit ARRIRAW (T-link recorder or XR drive)	2048 x 1152 (ProRes/DNxHD codecs to SxS card); 2880 x 2160 (ARRIRAW to external recorders or XR drive); 3164 x 1778 (ProRes with XR module upgrade)	160 - 3200 (800 native)	13.8 stops	Rolling	2x and 1.33x desqueeze	Optical low pass, IR, UV	0.75 - 120
Arri	Alexa Studio	23.76 x 17.82 mm	1.52	Arri PL	SxS card, T-link recorder (optional XR module upgrade)	12-bit 4444 ProRes, 10-bit 4:4:4 DNxHD (SxS card); 12-bit ARRIRAW (T-link recorder or XR drive)	2048 x 1152 (ProRes/DNxHD codecs to SxS card); 2880 x 1620 (ARRIRAW to external recorders or XR drive); 3164 x 1778 (ProRes with XR module upgrade)	160 - 3200 (800 native)	13.8 stops	Mechanical	2x and 1.33x desqueeze	Optical low pass, IR, UV, ND 0.6-1.3	0.75 - 120
Arri	Alexa HD; Alexa HD Plus	23.76 x 13.37 mm	1.52	Arri PL	SxS card	12-bit 4444 ProRes, 10-bit DNxHD (with license)	1920 x 1080	160 - 3200 (800 native)	14.5 stops (Log C, -6.7, +7.8)	Rolling	None by default, 2x and 1.33x desqueeze with license	Optical low pass, IR, UV	0,75 - 60 (default), 0.75 - 120 (with high speed license)
Arri	Alexa Mini	28.25 x 18.17 mm	1.28	Arri PL, EF, B4 (interchangeable)	CFast 2.0 card, SDI-6G recorders	12-bit 4444 ProRes XQ, ARRIRAW	3424 x 2202 (ARRIRAW); 3164 x 1778 (ProRes); 3840 x 2160 (In-camera upscaled ProRes)	160 - 3200 (800 native)	14.5 stops (Log C, -6.7, +7.8)	Rolling	2x and 1.33x desqueeze	Optical low pass, IR, UV, ND 0.6, 1.2, 2.1	0,75 - 200 (ProRes), 0.75 - 30 (ARRIRAW to CFast 2.0 card), 0,75 - 200 (ARRIRAW to external recorders)
Arri	Alexa LF	36.7 x 25.54 mm	0.98	LPL, ships with Arri PL adapter	SXR drive	12-bit ARRIRAW, ProRes 4444 XQ	4448x3096 (ARRIRAW)	160 - 3200 (800 native)	13.5 stops	Rolling	2x and 1.33x desqueeze	Optical low pass, IR, UV	23.98-150
Arri	Alexa Mini LF	36.7 x 25.54 mm	0.98	LPL, ships with Arri PL adapter	Codex Compact Drive	12-bit ARRIRAW, ProRes 4444 XQ	4448x3096 (ARRIRAW)	160 - 3200 (800 native)	13.5 stops	Rolling	2x and 1.33x desqueeze	Optical low pass, IR, UV, ND 0.6, 1.2, 1.8	23.98-90
Arri	Alexa SXT; Alexa SXT Plus	28.17 x 18.13 mm	1.28	Arri PL	SXR drive	12-bit 4444 ProRes XQ, 12-bit ARRIRAW	3414 x 2198 (ARRIRAW), 4096 x 2637 (In-camera upscaled ProRes)	160 - 3200 (800 native)	14.5 stops (Log C, -6.7, +7.8)	Rolling	2x and 1.33x desqueeze	Optical low pass, IR, UV, internal ND filter module with filters sold separately	0,75 - 120
Arri	Alexa SXT Studio	28.17 x 18.13 mm	1.28	Arri PL	SXR drive	12-bit 4444 ProRes XQ, 12-bit ARRIRAW	3414 x 2198 (ARRIRAW), 4096 x 2637 (In-camera upscaled ProRes)	160 - 3200 (800 native)	14.5 stops (Log C, -6.7, +7.8)	Mechanical	2x and 1.33x desqueeze	Optical low pass, IR, UV, internal ND filter module with filters sold separately	0,75 - 120
Arri	Alexa XT; Alexa XT Plus; Alexa XT M	28.17 x 18.13 mm	1.28	Arri PL	XR drive (optional SXR module upgrade, excluding Alexa XT M)	12-bit 4444 ProRes XQ, 10-bit 4:4:4 DNxHD (XR drive only), 12-bit ARRIRAW	2048 x 1152 (DNxHD); 3164 × 1778 (ProRes); 3414 x 2198 (ARRIRAW); 4096 x 2637 (In-camera upscaled ProRes with SXR module upgrade)	160 - 3200 (800 native)	14.5 stops (Log C, -6.7, +7.8)	Rolling	2x and 1.33x desqueeze	Optical low pass, IR, UV, internal ND filter module with filters sold separately	0,75 - 120
Arri	Alexa XT Studio	28.17 x 18.13 mm	1.28	Arri PL	XR drive (optional SXR module upgrade)	12-bit 4444 ProRes XQ, 10-bit 4:4:4 DNxHD (XR drive only), 12-bit ARRIRAW	2048 x 1152 (DNxHD); 3164 × 1778 (ProRes); 3414 x 2198 (ARRIRAW); 4096 x 2637 (In-camera upscaled ProRes with SXR module upgrade)	160 - 3200 (800 native)	14.5 stops (Log C, -6.7, +7.8)	Mechanical	2x and 1.33x desqueeze	Optical low pass, IR, UV, ND 0.6-1.3	0,75 - 120
Arri	Alexa XT B+W Monochrome	28.17 x 18.13 mm	1.28	Arri PL	XR drive (optional SXR module upgrade)	ProRes XQ, DNxHD (XR drive only), ARRIRAW	2048 x 1152 (DNxHD); 3164 × 1778 (ProRes); 3414 x 2198 (ARRIRAW); 4096 x 2637 (In-camera upscaled ProRes with SXR module upgrade)	160 - 3200 (2000 native)	15 stops	Rolling	2x and 1.33x desqueeze	Omits bayer filters, internal ND filter module with filters sold separately	0,75 - 120
Arri	Alexa 65	54.12 x 25.58 mm	0.67	Arri XPL	XR drive	ARRIRAW	6560 x 3102	160 - 3200 (800 native)	14 stops	Rolling			0,75 - 27 (60 fps upcoming)
Arri	Alexa 35	27.99 x 19.22 mm		Arri PL, LPL, Canon EF (interchangeable)	Codex Compact Drive	ARRIRAW, Apple ProRes 4444 XQ	4608 × 3164	160 - 6400	16.3 stops (Log C,-8, +9)	Rolling	1x-2x desqueeze	Optical low pass, IR, UV, ND 0.6, 1.2, 1.8	0.75 - 120
Arri	Amira	23.76 x 13.37 mm	1.52	Arri PL, B4, EF (interchangeable)	CFast 2.0 card	ProRes (10-bit 4:2:2 by default, 4:2:2 HQ and 12-bit 4444 with license)ARRIRAW (with license)	1920 x 1080 (default); 2048 x 1152 (with 2K license) 2880 x 1620 (ARRIRAW); 3840 x 2160 (in-camera upscaling with license)	160 - 3200 (800 native)	14.5 stops (Log C); 13.1 stops (usable)	Rolling	None	Optical low pass, IR, UV, ND 0.6, 1.2, 2.1	0,75 - 100 (default), 200 and 4K 60 with license
Arri	D-20; D-21	24.9 x 18.15 mm	1.45	Arri PL	HD-SDI recorder, T-link recorder	Uncompressed 12-bit 4:4:4 signal (HD-SDI recorders), ARRIRAW (T-link recorders)	1920 x 1080 (HD-SDI recorders); 2880 x 2160 (ARRIRAW recorders)	50 - 320 (D-20); 100 - 800 (D-21, 200 native)	11 stops (Log C data mode, +6, -5)	Mechanical	2x desqueeze	Optical low pass, IR	1 - 60
Blackmagic	Cinema Camera	15.81 x 8.88 mm CMOS	2.28	Canon EF, MFT, Arri PL	2.5" SSD	10-bit 4:2:2 ProRes, 10-bit DNxHD, 12-bit CinemaDNG RAW	1920 x 1080 (ProRes/DNxHD); 2432 x 1366 (CinemaDNG RAW)	200 - 1600 (800 native)	13 stops (BMD Film, +6, -7)	Rolling	None	None	23.98, 24, 25, 29.97, 30
Blackmagic	Micro Cinema Camera	12.48 x 7.02 mm CMOS	2.88	MFT	SD card	10-bit 4:2:2 ProRes, 12-bit CinemaDNG RAW	1920 x 1080	200 - 1600 (800 native)	13 stops	Rolling	None	None	23.98 - 60
Blackmagic	Pocket Cinema Camera	12.48 x 7.02 mm CMOS	2.88	MFT	SD card	10-bit 4:2:2 ProRes, 12-bit CinemaDNG RAW	1920 x 1080	200 - 1600 (800 native)	13 stops (BMD Film, +6, -7)	Rolling	None	None	23.98, 24, 25, 29.97, 30
Blackmagic	Pocket Cinema Camera 4K	18.96 x 10 mm CMOS	1.9	Active MFT	CFast card, SD card, USB-C drives	10-bit 4:2:2 ProRes, 12-bit Blackmagic RAW	4096 x 2160 (BRAW); 3840 x 2160 (ProRes)	100–25,600 (400 & 3200 dual native ISO)	13.1 stops (BMD Film ISO 400, +5.5, -7.6); 12.2 stops (BMD Film ISO 3200, +5.1, -7.2)	Rolling	None	None	23.98 - 60
Blackmagic	Pocket Cinema Camera 6K	23.1 x 12.99 mm CMOS	1.63	Canon EF	CFast card, SD card, USB-C drives	10-bit 4:2:2 ProRes, 12-bit Blackmagic RAW	6144 x 3456 (BRAW); 4096 x 2160 (ProRes)	100–25,600 (400 & 3200 dual native ISO)	13.5 stops (BMD Film ISO 400, +5.9, -7.8); 12.2 stops (BMD Film ISO 3200, +5.6, -6.5)	Rolling	None	None	23.98 - 60
Blackmagic	Pocket Cinema Camera 6K (L-Mount)	36 x 24 mm CMOS	1	Leica L-Mount	CFexpress card, USB-C drives	12-bit Blackmagic RAW, 8-bit 4:2:0 H.264	6048 x 4032 (BRAW) 1920 x 1080 (H.264)	100-25,600 (400 & 3200 dual native ISO)	13.5 stops (BMD Film ISO 400, +5.9, -7.8); 12.1 stops (BMD Film ISO 3200, +5.6, -6.5)	Rolling	4.8K 6:5 sensor windowing	Optical low pass	23.98 - 120
Blackmagic	Pocket Cinema Camera 6K Pro	23.1 x 12.99 mm CMOS	1.63	Canon EF	CFast card, SD card, USB-C drives	10-bit 4:2:2 ProRes, 12-bit Blackmagic RAW	6144 x 3456 (BRAW); 4096 x 2160 (ProRes)	100–25,600 (400 & 3200 dual native ISO)	13.5 stops (BMD Film ISO 400, +5.9, -7.8); 12.1 stops (BMD Film ISO 3200, +5.6, -6.5)	Rolling	3.7K 6:5 sensor windowing	ND 0.3, 0.6, 0.9	23.98 - 120
Blackmagic	Production Camera 4K	21.12 x 11.88 mm CMOS	1.7	Canon EF, MFT, Arri PL	2.5" SSD	10-bit 4:2:2 ProRes, 12-bit CinemaDNG RAW	3840 x 2160 (ProRes); 4000 x 2160 (CinemaDNG Raw)	200 - 800 (400 native)	12 stops (BMD Film, per manufacturer); 8.2 stops (usable)	Global	None	None	23.98, 24, 25, 29.97, 30
Blackmagic	PYXIS 6K	36 x 24mm	1	Canon EF, Arri PL or Leica L-Mount	CFexpress Type B, USB-C drives	12-bit Blackmagic RAW, H.264 proxy recording	6048 x 4032	400 and 3200 dual native	13 stops	Rolling	Anamorphic 6:5 sensor windowing	Optical low pass	23.90-120
Blackmagic	PYXIS 12K	36 x 24mm	1	Canon EF, Arri PL or Leica L-Mount	CFexpress Type B, USB-C drives	12-bit Blackmagic RAW, H.264 proxy recording	12,288 x 8040	800 native	16 stops	Rolling	Anamorphic 6:5 sensor windowing	Optical low pass	23.90-112
Blackmagic	Ursa 4K	21.12 x 11.88 mm CMOS	1.7	Canon EF, Arri PL, B4 (interchangeable)	CFast 2.0 card	10-bit 4:4:4 ProRes, 12-bit CinemaDNG RAW	3840 x 2160 (ProRes); 4000 x 2160 (CinemaDNG Raw)	200 - 1600 (400 native)	12 stops (BMD Film)	Global	None	None	23.98, 24, 25, 29.97, 30, 50, 60
Blackmagic	Ursa 4.6K	25.34 x 14.25 mm& CMOS	1.42	Canon EF, Arri PL, B4 (interchangeable)	CFast 2.0 card	12-bit 4444 ProRes XQ, 12-bit CinemaDNG RAW	4608 x 2592 (CinemaDNG RAW); 3840 x 2160 (ProRes)	200 - 1600 (800 native)	15 stops	Rolling	3K 1.2:1 sensor windowing and 2x desqueeze, 1.3x desqueeze	None	23.98 - 120
Blackmagic	Ursa Mini 4K	21.12 x 11.88 mm	1.7	Canon EF, Arri PL	CFast 2.0 card	10-bit 4:4:4 ProRes, 12-bit CinemaDNG RAW	3840 x 2160 (ProRes); 4000 x 2160 (CinemaDNG Raw)	200 - 1600 (400 native)	12 stops (BMD Film) 8.5 stops (usable)	Global	None	None	23.98 - 60
Blackmagic	Ursa Mini 4.6K	25.34 x 14.25 mm	1.42	Canon EF, Arri PL	CFast 2.0 card	12-bit 4444 ProRes XQ, 12-bit CinemaDNG RAW	4608 x 2592 (CinemaDNG RAW); 3840 x 2160 (ProRes)	200 - 1600 (800 native)	15 stops ~12 stops (usable)	Rolling	3K 1.2:1 sensor windowing and 2x desqueeze, 1.3x desqueeze	None	23.98 - 60
Blackmagic	Ursa Mini Pro	25.34 x 14.25 mm	1.42	Canon EF, Arri PL (interchangeable)	CFast 2.0 card, SD card	12-bit 4444 ProRes XQ, 12-bit CinemaDNG RAW	4608 x 2592 (CinemaDNG RAW); 3840 x 2160 (ProRes)	200 - 1600 (800 native)	15 stops	Rolling	3K 1.2:1 sensor windowing and 2x desqueeze, 1.3x desqueeze	IR ND 0.6, 1.2, 1.8	23.98 - 60
Blackmagic	Ursa Mini Pro G2	25.34 x 14.25 mm	1.42	Canon EF, Arri PL, B4, F-Mount (interchangeable)	CFast 2.0 card, SD card	12-bit 4444 ProRes XQ, 12-bit Blackmagic RAW	4608 x 2592 (BRAW) 3840x2160 (Prores)	200 - 3200 (800 native)	15 stops	Rolling	3K 1.2:1 sensor windowing and 2x, 1.3x desqueeze	IR ND 0.6, 1.2, 1.8	23.98 - 120
Blackmagic	Ursa Mini Pro 12K	27.03 x 14.25 mm	1.42	Canon EF, Arri PL, F-Mount (interchangeable)	CFast 2.0 card, SD card, 2.5-inch SSD via URSA Mini Recorder	12-bit Blackmagic RAW	12,288 x 6480	200 - 3200 (800 native)	14 stops	Rolling	1.2:1 sensor windowing and 2x, 1.3x desqueeze	IR ND 0.6, 1.2, 1.8, optical low pass (OLPF model)	23.98 - 160
Blackmagic	Ursa Cine 12K	35.64 x 23.32 mm	1.02	Canon EF, Arri PL, F-Mount (interchangeable)	Blackmagic Media Module	12-bit Blackmagic RAW	12,288 x 8040	800 native	16 stops	Rolling	2x, 1.3x desqueeze	ND 0.6, 1.2, 1.8	23.98-224
Blackmagic	Ursa Cine 17K	50.81 x 23.32 mm	0.77	PL, LPL	Blackmagic Media Module	12-bit Blackmagic RAW	17,520 x 8040	800 native	16 stops	Rolling	2x, 1.3x desqueeze	None	23.98-170
Canon	C50	35.9 x 23.9 mm	1.0	Canon RF	UHS-II SDXC card, CFexpress Type B	10-bit 4:2:2 XF-AVC, XF-AVC S, and XF-HEVC S (to SD card) 12-bit Cinema RAW Light (to CFexpress)	6960 x 4640 (Cinema RAW Light) 4096 x 2160 (AVC/HEVC)	100 t0 102,400 (800 and 6400 dual native)	12.5 stops	Rolling	2x, 1.8x, 1.5x, and 1.3x desqueeze	Optical low pass	23.98 - 150
Canon	C70	26.2 x 13.8 mm	1.46	Canon RF (RF to EF adapter included)	SD card	10 bit 4:2:2 XF-AVC, HEVC, 12-bit Cinema RAW Light	4096 x 2160	100 - 102,400 (800 native)	12.8 stops	Rolling	None	Optical low pass, IR, ND 0.6, 1.2, 1.8 (ND 0.6, 1.2, 1.8, 2.4, 3.0 expanded)	23.98-120
Canon	C80	38.4 x 20.2 mm	0.94	Canon RF	UHS-II SDXC card	Cinema RAW Light (12-bit), XF-AVC, XF-AVC S, and XF-HEVC S	6000 x 3164 (Cinema RAW Light) 4096 x 2160 (AVC/HEVC)	160-25,600 (800, 3,200 and 12,800 native)	13.3 stops	Rolling	2x, 1.8x, 1.5x, and 1.3x desqueeze	Optical low pass,ND 0.6, 1.2, 1.8, 2.4	23.98 - 180
Canon	C100	24.6 x 13.8 mm	1.46	Canon EF	SD card, HDMI recorder	8-bit 4:2:0 AVCHD (internal recording), uncompressed 4:2:2 signal (HDMI recorders)	1920 x 1080	320 to 80,000 (850 native)	12 stops (Canon Log, -6.7, +5.3)	Rolling	None	Optical low pass, IR, ND 0.6, 1.2, 1.8	1-30 (1-60)
Canon	C100 Mark II	24.6 x 13.8 mm	1.46	Canon EF	SD card, HDMI recorder	8-bit 4:2:0 AVCHD, MP4 (internal recording), uncompressed 4:2:2 signal (HDMI recorders)	1920 x 1080	320 to 102,400 (850 native)	12 stops (Canon Log, -6.7, +5.3)	Rolling	None	Optical low pass, IR, ND 0.6, 1.2, 1.8	1-60
Canon	C200	24.6 x 13.8 mm	1.46	Canon EF, Arri PL (interchangeable with mount kit)	CFast 2.0 card, SD card	12-bit Cinema RAW Light (to CFast card), 8-bit 4:2:0 MPEG4 (to SD card, uncompressed 4K 12-bit signal (HDMI recorders) or 2K signal (HD-SDI recorders)	4096 x 2160 (Cinema RAW Light); 3840 x 2160 (MPEG4)	100 to 102,400 (800 native)	13 stops	Rolling	None	Optical low pass, IR, ND 0.6, 1.2, 1.8 (ND 0.6, 1.2, 1.8, 2.4, 3.0 expanded)	23.98-60 (4K) 23.98-120 (1080p)
Canon	C300	24.6 x 13.8 mm	1.46	Canon EF, Arri PL	CF card, HDMI/HD-SDI recorder	8-bit 4:2:2 MPEG2 (internal recording), uncompressed signal (HDMI/HD-SDI recorders)	1920 x 1080	320 to 80,000 (850 native)	12 stops (Canon Log, -6.7, +5.3)	Rolling	None	Optical low pass, IR, ND 0.6, 1.2, 1.8	1-30 (1-60)
Canon	C300 Mark II	24.6 x 13.8 mm	1.46	Canon EF, Arri PL (interchangeable by Canon)	CFast 2.0 card, HDMI/HD-SDI recorder	10-bit 4:2:2 MPEG2 (4K internal recording), 12-bit 4:4:4 MPEG2 (2K internal recording), uncompressed 4K 12-bit signal (HDMI recorders) or 2K signal (HD-SDI recorders)	4096 x 2160	320 to 102,400 (800 native)	12.3 stops (Canon Log 2)	Rolling	None	Optical low pass, IR, ND 0.6 - 3	1-30 (4K); 1-120 (2K)
Canon	C300 Mark III	26.2 x 13.8 mm	1.37	Canon EF, Arri PL (interchangeable with mount kit)	CFexpress card, SD card, HDMI/HD-SDI recorder	12-bit Cinema RAW Light, 10-bit 4:2:2 MPEG2, uncompressed 4K 12-bit signal (HDMI/HD-SDI recorders)	4096 x 2160	100 to 102,400 (800 native)	12.8 stops (Canon Log)	Rolling	2x and 1.33x desqueeze	Optical low pass, IR, ND 0.6 - 3	1-120 (4K); 1-180 (2K)
Canon	C400	38.4 x 20.3 mm	0.94	Canon RF	UHS-II SDXC card, CFexpress Type B	10-bit 4:2:2 XF-AVC, XF-AVC S, and XF-HEVC S (to SD card) 12-bit Cinema RAW Light (to CFexpress)	6000 x 3164 (Cinema RAW Light) 4096 x 2160 (AVC/HEVC)	160-25,600 (800, 3,200 and 12,800 native)	13 stops	Rolling	2x, 1.8x, 1.5x, and 1.3x desqueeze	Optical low pass, IR, ND 0.6 - 3	23.98 - 180
Canon	C500	26.2 x 13.8 mm	1.37	Canon EF, Arri PL	CF card, HDMI/HD-SDI recorder	8-bit 4:2:2 MPEG2 (internal recording), uncompressed 4K 10-bit 4:4:4 or 2K 12-bit 4:4:4 signal (HD-SDI recorders)	1920 x 1080 (internal recording); 4096 x 2160 (HD-SDI recorders)	320 to 80,000 (850 native)	12 stops (Canon Log, -6.7, +5.3)	Rolling	None	Optical low pass, IR, ND 0.6, 1.2, 1.8	1-30 (1-60)
Canon	C500 Mark II	38.1 x 20.1 mm	0.94	Canon EF, Arri PL (interchangeable)	CFexpress card, SD card, HDMI/HD-SDI recorder	12-bit Cinema RAW Light, 10-bit 4:2:2 MPEG2, uncompressed 4K 12-bit signal (HD-SDI recorders)	5952 x 3140	100 to 102,400 (800 native)	13.1 stops (Canon Log)	Rolling	2x and 1.33x desqueeze	Optical low pass, IR, ND 0.6, 1.2, 1.8	1-30 (1-60)
Canon	C700; C700 GS PL	26.2 x 13.8 mm	1.37	Canon EF, Arri PL (interchangeable by Canon)	CFast 2.0 card, SD card, Codex recorder	12-bit 4444 ProRes, 12-bit 4:4:4 XF-AVC (to CFast 2.0 card), 8-bit XF-AVC (SD card), 12-bit RAW (to external recorders)	4096 x 2160 (internal recording); 4512 x 2376 (RAW to external recorder)	100 to 102,400 (850 native)	15 stops (Canon Log 2, -8.7, +6.3); 14 stops (GS PL global shutter)	Rolling; Global (GS PL version)	1.3x and 2x desqueeze	Optical low pass, IR, ND 0.6, 1.2, 1.8, 2.4, 3.6	23.98-60 (6K), 23.98-120 (2K)
Canon	C700 FF	38.1 x 20.1 mm	0.94	Canon EF, Arri PL (interchangeable by Canon)	CFast 2.0 card, SD card, Codex recorder	12-bit 4444 ProRes, 12-bit 4:4:4 XF-AVC (to CFast 2.0 card), 8-bit XF-AVC (SD card), 12-bit RAW (to external recorders)	4096 x 2160 (internal recording); 5952 x 3140 (RAW to external recorder)	100 to 102,400 (850 native)	15 stops (Canon Log 2, -8.7, +6.3); 14 stops (GS PL global shutter)	Rolling; Global (GS PL version)	1.3x and 2x desqueeze	Optical low pass, IR, ND 0.6, 1.2, 1.8, 2.4, 3.6	23.98-60 (ProRes/XF-AVC), 23.98-120 (4K RAW), 23.98-240 (2K RAW)
Canon	ME20F-SH	Full frame 35 mm		Canon EF			1920 x 1080	800 to 4,560,000	12 stops			IR, ND 1/8, 1/64	23.98-59.94
Dalsa	Origin II	34 x 17.2 mm	1.06	Arri PL			1920 x 1080						30
Digital Bolex	D16	12.85 x 9.64 mm CCD	2.8	C-mount, EF, MFT, PL	CF card, internal flash storage (non-removable)	12-bit 4:4:4 CinemaDNG RAW	2048 x 1152	100 - 800 (200 native)	12 stops	Global	None	Optical low pass	23.98-90
Digital Bolex	D16 Monochrome	12.85 x 9.64 mm CCD	2.8	C-mount, EF, MFT, PL	CF card, internal flash storage (non-removable)	CinemaDNG RAW	2048 x 1152		13 stops	Global	None	Omits bayer filters	23.98-90
Hitachi	SK-UHD8000	Super 35		Arri PL			7680 X 4320 8K						
Ikegami	SHK-810	Super 35		Arri PL			7680 X 4320 8K						
JVC	GY-LS300	Super 35	1.5	Micro Four Thirds	SD card (dual slot: mirror, relay, proxy, sequential)	H.264 8 bit 4:2:0 / 4:2:2 up to 150 Mbit/s	4096 x 2160 4K 3840 x 2160 4K	400 - 25600 (400 native)	11.8 stops (-6.3, + 5.5)	Rolling	None	ND 0.6, 1.2, 1.8	23.976-120
Panasonic	AG-AF100 AG-AF101 AG-AF102 AG-AF105	17.8 x 10 mm	2.02	Micro Four Thirds	SD card(dual slot, only sequential)	AVCHD 4:2:0 8 bit 24 Mbit/s RAW 4:2:2 8 bit (external)	1920 x 1080	200 - 3200 (400 native)	10.2 stops (-5.9, +4.3) at ISO 800	Rolling	None	ND 0.6, 1.2, 1.8	12–60
Panasonic	AJ-HPX3700	2/3" CCD x 3	4.09	2/3 inch bayonet mount		H.264, AVC-Intra 100	1920 x 1080						24, 1-60
Panasonic	AJ-HPX2000	2/3" CCD x 3	4.09	2/3 inch bayonet mount		DVCPRO HD 137 Mbit/s	1920 x 1080						60 (interlaced)
Panasonic	AJ-HPX3100GJ	2/3" CCD x 3	4.09	2/3 inch bayonet mount		AVC-Intra 100, DVCPRO HD 68 Mbit/s	1920 x 1080						30 (60)
Panasonic	AK-SHB800GJ	Full frame 35mm CMOS		EF lens mount			8K						
Panasonic	AU-EVA1	Full frame 35mm MOS	1.5	EF lens mount	SDHC, SDXC	MOV: 4:2:2 10 bit/4:2:0 8 bit AVCHD: 4:2:0 8 bit	4096 x 2160	NATIVE: 800, 2500 800 Base: 200 to 2000 2500 Base: 1000 to 25600	14 stops	Rolling		ND 0.6, 1.2, 1.8 IR cut filter	23.98p - 240p
Panasonic	Varicam 35	26.688 mm × 14.184 mm	1.35	35 mm, PL	expressP2 card, P2 card, microP2 card	V-RAW 12 bit/10 bit, AVC-Intra4K444, ProRes 4444	4096 x 2160	800 - 12,800 (800 & 5000 dual native ISO)	14+ stops	Rolling	1.33:1 and 2.0:1 desqueeze	UV/IR-cut filter, ND 0.6, 1.2, 1.8	23.98p - 120p
Panasonic	Varicam LT	26.688 mm × 14.184 mm	1.35	EF, PL	expressP2 card, P2 card, microP2 card	V-RAW 12 bit/10 bit, AVC-Intra4K444, ProRes 4444	4096 x 2160	800 - 12,800 (800 & 5000 dual native ISO)	14+ stops	Rolling	1.33:1 and 2.0:1 desqueeze	UV/IR-cut filter, ND 0.6, 1.2, 1.8	23.98p - 59.94
Panavision	Millennium DXL	40.96 x 21.60mm	0.88	Panavision PV mount	Mini RedMag SSD	16-bit Redcode RAW, ProRes, DNxHD	8192 x 4320	800 native	14.8 stops		2x and 1.33x desqueeze		23.98 - 60 (8K)
Panavision	Millennium DXL 2	40.96 x 21.60mm	0.88	Panavision PV mount	Mini RedMag SSD	16-bit Redcode RAW, ProRes, DNxHD	8192 x 4320	1600 native	14.9 stops		2x and 1.33x desqueeze		23.98 - 60 (8K)
Panavision	Genesis	24.89 x 16.86mm	1.45	Panavision PV mount	HD-SDI recorder, SSR-1 recorder, HDCAM recorder	10-bit 4:4:4 signal (HD-SDI recorders)	1920 x 1080	400 - 1600 (400 native)	8 stops	Global	None		30 (1-60)
Panavision	HD900F	2/3" CCD	4.09	Panavision PV mount		HDCAM	1920 x 1080						30 (24)
Red	Epic Dragon	30.7 x 15.8 mm	1.25	PL, EF, F-mount (interchangeable)	RedMag SSD (optional Mini RedMag SSD module upgrade)	16-bit .r3d	6144 x 3160	80 – 12800 (250 native)	14.8 stops (RedLogFilm, -8.3, +6.5)	Rolling (optional Motion Mount upgrade adds mechanical shutter)	1.22:1 sensor windowing and 2x/1.3x desqueeze	Combination optical low pass/IR (interchangeable with low-light optimized version), optional Motion Mount upgrade adds ND 0.48 - 2.4 (up to 1.2 with mechanical shutter)	1-100 (6K); 1-120 (5K); 1-150 (4K); 1-200 (3K); 1-300 (2K)
Red	Epic Dragon Monochrome	30.7 x 15.8 mm	1.25	PL, EF, F-mount (interchangeable)	RedMag SSD (optional Mini RedMag SSD module upgrade)	.r3d	6144 x 3160			Rolling (optional Motion Mount upgrade adds mechanical shutter)	1.22:1 sensor windowing and 2x/1.3x desqueeze	Omits bayer filters, optional Motion Mount upgrade adds ND 0.48 - 2.4 (up to 1.2 with mechanical shutter)	1-100 (6K); 1-120 (5K); 1-150 (4K); 1-200 (3K); 1-300 (2K)
Red	Epic Mysterium-X	27.7 x 14.6 mm	1.38	PL, EF, F-mount (interchangeable)	RedMag SSD (optional Mini RedMag SSD module upgrade)	16-bit .r3d	5120 x 2700	80 – 12800 (800 native)	12.5 stops (-7, +5.5)	Rolling (optional Motion Mount upgrade adds mechanical shutter)	1.22:1 sensor windowing and 2x/1.3x desqueeze	Optical low pass, optional Motion Mount upgrade adds ND 0.48 - 2.4 (up to 1.2 with mechanical shutter)	1-120 (5K); 1-180 (3K); 1-225 (2K)
Red	Epic Mysterium-X Monochrome	27.7 x 14.6 mm	1.38	PL, EF, F-mount (interchangeable)	RedMag SSD (optional Mini RedMag SSD module upgrade)	.r3d	5120 x 2700	80 – 12800 (2000 native)		Rolling (optional Motion Mount upgrade adds mechanical shutter)	1.22:1 sensor windowing and 2x/1.3x desqueeze	Omits bayer filters, optional Motion Mount upgrade adds ND 0.48 - 2.4 (up to 1.2 with mechanical shutter)	1-120 (5K); 1-180 (3K); 1-225 (2K)
Red	Epic-W Gemini	30.72 x 18 mm	1.25	PL, EF, F-mount (interchangeable)	Mini RedMag SSD	16-bit .r3d, 12-bit 4444 ProRes XQ, 12-bit DNxHR HQX	5120 x 3000 (r3d); 4096 x 2160 (ProRes, DNxHR)	800, 3200 dual native ISO rating with Standard OLPF)	15.2 stops	Rolling (optional Motion Mount upgrade adds mechanical shutter)	1.22:1 sensor windowing and 2x/1.3x desqueeze	Combination optical low pass/IR (interchangeable with low-light optimized version), optional Motion Mount upgrade adds ND 0.48 - 2.4 (up to 1.2 with mechanical shutter)	1-30 (8K); 1-75 (6K); 1-96 (5K); 1-120 (4K); 1-150 (3K); 1-240 (2K)
Red	Epic-W Helium	29.9 x 15.8 mm	1.28	PL, EF, F-mount (interchangeable)	Mini RedMag SSD	16-bit .r3d, 12-bit 4444 ProRes XQ, 12-bit DNxHR HQX	8192 x 4320 (r3d); 4096 x 2160 (ProRes, DNxHR)	1280-2500 (Balanced ISO rating with Standard OLPF)	15.2 stops	Rolling (optional Motion Mount upgrade adds mechanical shutter)	1.22:1 sensor windowing and 2x/1.3x desqueeze	Combination optical low pass/IR (interchangeable with low-light optimized version), optional Motion Mount upgrade adds ND 0.48 - 2.4 (up to 1.2 with mechanical shutter)	1-30 (8K); 1-75 (6K); 1-96 (5K); 1-120 (4K); 1-150 (3K); 1-240 (2K)
Red	Komodo	27.03 x 14.25 mm	1.416	Canon RF	CFast 2.0 card	12-bit .r3d	6144 x 3240		12.5 stops (R3D HQ) 12.2 stops (ProRes 422 HQ)	Global	Yes	No	23.98-40 (6K) 23.98-48 (5K) 23.98-60 (4K) 23.98-120 (2K)
Red	One	24.4 x 13.7 mm	1.48	PL, EF, F-mount (interchangeable)	CF card, Red Hard Drive (optional RedMag SSD module upgrade)	12-bit .r3d	4096 x 2304	100 - 2000 (320 native)	11.3 stops	Rolling	1.22:1 sensor windowing and 2x desqueeze		1-30 (120)
Red	One Mysterium-X	24.2 x 12.5 mm	1.59	PL, EF, F-mount (interchangeable)	CF card, Red Hard Drive (optional RedMag SSD module upgrade)	12-bit .r3d	4480 x 2304	100 - 6400 (800 native)	11.9 stops (-7, +5)	Rolling	1.22:1 sensor windowing and 2x desqueeze		1-30 (120)
Red	Raven	23.04 x 10.8 mm	1.56	Canon EF	Mini RedMag SSD	16-bit .r3d, 10-bit 422 ProRes	4608 × 2160 (r3d); 2048 × 1080 (ProRes)	250 native	14.8 stops (RedLogFilm, -8.3, +6.5)	Rolling	None	Combination optical low pass/IR	1-120 (4K); 1-160 (3K); 1-240 (2K)
Red	Scarlet Mysterium-X	27.7 x 14.6 mm	1.38	PL, EF, F-mount (interchangeable)	RedMag SSD (optional Mini RedMag SSD module upgrade)	16-bit .r3d	5120 x 2700 (Maximum 12 fps); 4096 x 2160	80 – 12800 (800 native)	11.9 stops (-7, +5)	Rolling (optional Motion Mount upgrade adds mechanical shutter)	None	Optical low pass, optional Motion Mount upgrade adds ND 0.48 - 2.4 (up to 1.2 with mechanical shutter)	1-12 (5K); 1-30 (4K); 1-48 (3K); 1-60 (1080p); 1-120 (1K)
Red	Scarlet Dragon	30.7 x 15.8 mm	1.17	PL, EF, F-mount (interchangeable)	RedMag SSD (optional Mini RedMag SSD module upgrade)	16-bit .r3d	6144 x 3160 (Maximum 12 fps); 5120 x 2700	80 – 12800 (250 native)	14.8 stops (RedLogFilm, -8.3, +6.5)	Rolling (optional Motion Mount upgrade adds mechanical shutter)	1.22:1 sensor windowing and 2x/1.3x desqueeze	Combination optical low pass/IR (interchangeable with low-light optimized version), optional Motion Mount upgrade adds ND 0.48 - 2.4 (up to 1.2 with mechanical shutter)	1-12 (6K); 1-48 (5K); 1-60 (4K); 1-80 (3K); 1-120 (2K)
Red	Scarlet-W Dragon	25.6 x 13.5 mm	1.41	PL, EF, F-mount (interchangeable)	Mini RedMag SSD	16-bit .r3d, 10-bit 4:2:2 ProRes HQ	5120 × 2700 (r3d); 2048 × 1080 (ProRes)	250 native	14.8 stops (RedLogFilm, -8.3, +6.5)	Rolling (optional Motion Mount upgrade adds mechanical shutter)	1.22:1 sensor windowing and 2x/1.3x desqueeze	Combination optical low pass/IR (interchangeable with low-light optimized version), optional Motion Mount upgrade adds ND 0.48 - 2.4 (up to 1.2 with mechanical shutter)	1-60 (5K); 1-120 (4.5K); 1-150 (4K); 1-200 (3K); 1-300 (2K)
Red	V-Raptor	40.96 x 21.60 mm	0.93	Canon RF (EF with adapter)	CFexpress	16-bit .r3d, ProRes 4444 XQ	8192 × 4320 (r3d); 4096 x 2160 (ProRes)		14.9 stops	Rolling	2x-1.25x desqueeze	Combination optical low pass/IR	1-150 (8K); 1-200 (6K); 1-300 (4K); 1-600 (2K)
Red	Weapon Dragon 6K	30.7 x 15.8 mm	1.25	PL, EF, F-mount (interchangeable)	Mini RedMag SSD	16-bit .r3d, 12-bit 4444 ProRes XQ	6144 x 3160 (r3d); 2048 x 1152 (ProRes)	250 native	14.8 stops (RedLogFilm, -8.3, +6.5)	Rolling (optional Motion Mount upgrade adds mechanical shutter)	1.22:1 sensor windowing and 2x/1.3x desqueeze	Combination optical low pass/IR (interchangeable with low-light optimized version), optional Motion Mount upgrade adds ND 0.48 - 2.4 (up to 1.2 with mechanical shutter)	1-100 (6K); 1-120 (5K); 1-150 (4K); 1-200 (3K); 1-300 (2K)
Red	Weapon Dragon 8K	40.96mm x 21.6mm	0.93	PL, EF, F-mount (interchangeable)	Mini RedMag SSD	16-bit .r3d, 12-bit 4444 ProRes XQ, 12-bit DNxHR HQX	8192 x 4320 (r3d); 4096 x 2160 (ProRes); 4096 x 2160 (DNxHR)	250 native	14.8 stops (RedLogFilm, -8.3, +6.5)	Rolling (optional Motion Mount upgrade adds mechanical shutter)	1.22:1 sensor windowing and 2x/1.3x desqueeze	Combination optical low pass/IR (interchangeable with low-light optimized version), optional Motion Mount upgrade adds ND 0.48 - 2.4 (up to 1.2 with mechanical shutter)	1 - 75 (8K)
Red	Weapon Helium	29.9mm x 15.8mm	1.28	PL, EF, F-mount (interchangeable)	Mini RedMag SSD	16-bit .r3d, 12-bit 4444 ProRes XQ, 12-bit DNxHR HQX	8192 x 4320 (r3d); 4096 x 2160 (ProRes, DNxHR)	1280-2500 (Balanced ISO rating with Standard OLPF)	15.2 stops	Rolling (optional Motion Mount upgrade adds mechanical shutter)	1.22:1 sensor windowing and 2x/1.3x desqueeze	Combination optical low pass/IR (interchangeable with low-light optimized version), optional Motion Mount upgrade adds ND 0.48 - 2.4 (up to 1.2 with mechanical shutter)	1 - 60 (8K)
Red	Weapon Monstro 8K VV	40.96 mm x 21.60 mm	0.93	PL, EF, F-mount (interchangeable)	Mini RedMag SSD	16-bit .r3d, 12-bit 4444 ProRes XQ, 12-bit DNxHR HQX	8192 x 4320 (r3d); 4096 x 2160 (ProRes); 4096 x 2160 (DNxHR)	250-12,800, default 800	14.9 stops	Rolling (optional Motion Mount upgrade adds mechanical shutter)	1.22:1 sensor windowing and 2x/1.3x desqueeze	Combination optical low pass/IR (interchangeable with low-light optimized version), optional Motion Mount upgrade adds ND 0.48 - 2.4 (up to 1.2 with mechanical shutter)	60 fps (8K) 75 fps (8K 2.4:1) 100 fps (6K 2.4:1) 96 fps (5K) 120 fps (5K 2.4:1) 150 fps (4K 2.4:1) 200 fps (3K 2.4:1) 240 fps (2K) 300 fps (2K 2.4:1)
Sony	BURANO	35.9 x 24.0 mm	1	Arri PL, E-mount (interchangeable)	CFexpress Type B	16-bit X-OCN (LT) RAW, 10-bit XAVC	8632 x 4856	800, 3200	16 stops	Rolling	2x, 1.8x, 1.5x, 1.3x	ND 0.6 to 2.1, IR	23.98-240
Sony	F35	21.6 x 13.3 mm	1.67	Arri PL			1920 x 1080	400 native	11.3 stops (-5, +6.3)	Global			1-60
Sony	F65	24.7 x 13.1 mm	1.46	Arri PL	SR Memory Recorder		8182 x 2160	800 native	14 stops (-7, +7)	Mechanical	2x and 1.3x desqueeze	Optical low pass, ND 0.9, 1.2, 1.5, 1.8	1-60
Sony	F55	24 x 12.7 mm	1.46	Sony FZ, Arri PL	SxS card, AXS-R5 Recorder		4096 x 2160	1250 native	14 stops	Global	1.3x and 2x desqueeze	Optical low pass (interchangeable), ND 0.9, 1.8	1-60
Sony	NEX-FS100	21.6 x 13.3 mm	1.67	E-mount		MPEG4 AVCHD 28 Mbit/s	1920 x 1080	800 native	11.5 stops (-6.5, +5)	Rolling		None	1, 2, 4, 8, 15, 30, 60
Sony	NEX-FS700 NEX-FS700E NEX-FS700U NEX-FS700R	23.6 x 13.3 mm	1.53	E-mount	SD card, Memory Stick, HD-SDI recorder, AXS-R5 recorder	MPEG4 AVCHD	4096 x 2160 (updated FS700/E or FS700U/R native; available only when using an external recorder) 1920x1080 (all)	500 native	12 stops (-7, +5)	Rolling		ND 0.6, 1.2, 1.8	1–240
Sony	NEX-EA50	23.5 x 15.6 mm	1.54	E-mount	SD card, Memory Stick	AVCHD 2.0 28 Mbit/s	1920 x1080	160-5000		Rolling			60, 50, 30, 25, 24
Sony	NEX-VG10	23.4 x 15.6 mm	1.54	E-mount	SD card, Memory Stick	AVCHD 24 Mbit/s	1920 x 1080			Rolling			60i, 30
Sony	NEX-VG20	23.4 x 15.6 mm	1.54	E-mount	SD card, Memory Stick	AVCHD 2.0 24 Mbit/s	1920 x 1080			Rolling	None		60, 50, 30, 25, 24
Sony	NEX-VG30	23.4 x 15.6 mm	1.54	E-mount	SD card, Memory Stick	AVCHD 2.0 24 Mbit/s	1920 x 1080			Rolling	None		60, 50, 30, 25, 24
Sony	NEX-VG900	35.8 x 23.9 mm	1.01	E-mount	SD card, Memory Stick	AVCHD 2.0 28 Mbit/s	1920 x 1080			Rolling	None		60, 50, 30, 25, 24
Sony	PMW-F3K, PMW-F3L	21.6 x 13.3 mm	1.67	FZ- mount, PL-mount	SxS card	MPEG2 35 Mbit/s	1440 x 1080	800 native	11.2 stops (-7, +4.3)	Rolling		ND 0.9, 1.8	1, 2, 4, 8, 15, 30, 60
Sony	PMW-F5	24 x 12.7 mm	1.5	E-mount, PL-mount		MPEG2 35 Mbit/s	1920 x 1080 (default); 4096 x 2160 (with 4K license or altering internal preferences)	2000 native	14 stops	Rolling	1.3x and 2x desqueeze	Optical low pass (interchangeable), ND 0.9, 1.8	1, 2, 4, 8, 15, 30, 60
Sony	Sony PXW-FS5	24 x 12.7 mm	1.5	E-mount	SD card	XAVC Long, AVCHD	3840 x 2160	3200 native	14 stops	Rolling		ND 0.6, 1.2, 1.8, 2.1	
Sony	Sony PXW-FS7	24 x 12.7 mm	1.5	E-mount	XQD card, HD-SDI and HDMI 2.0 recorder	XAVC Intra, XAVC Long, MPEG 2 600 Mbit/s, ProRes (422 HQ, 422 1080p, upcoming)	4096 x 2160	2000 native	14 stops 12.5 stops (usable)	Rolling		ND 0.6, 1.2, 1.8	23.98 - 60 (4K), 23.98 - 180 (1080p)
Sony	VENICE	36 x 24 mm with full frame license, 24.3 x 12.8 mm by default	1	E-mount, PL mount (add-on)	SxS card, AXS-R7 recorder (add-on, optional, records onto AxS cards)	10-bit XAVC, 4:2:2 Apple ProRes (SxS card), 16-bit RAW (AXS-R7 recorder)	6048 x 4032 (with full frame license); 4096 x 2160 (default)	500 and 2500 dual native	15 stops (-9, +6)	Rolling	4:3 sensor-windowing and 2x desqueeze with license	ND 0.3-2.4	23.98 - 120 (4K), 23.98 - 60 (6K)
Sony	VENICE 2	36 mm × 24 mm	1	Arri PL, E-mount (interchangeable)	Sony AXS card	16-bit X-OCN RAW, 10-bit ProRes 4444 XQ	8640 × 5760 (8.6K sensor) 6048 × 4032 (6K sensor)	800 and 3200 (8.6K sensor) 500 and 2500 (6K sensor)	16 stops	Rolling	2x, 1.8x, 1.5x, 1.3x	ND 0.3-2.4	23.90-120
Vision Research, Inc	Phantom 65	52.1 x 30.5 mm	0.69	Arri PL (standard), Nikon F / Mamiya 645 (optional)		Cine RAW 2341 Mbit/s	4096 x 2440						141, (1080p320)
Vision Research	Phantom Flex	52.1 x 30.5 mm	0.69	Arri PL (standard), Nikon F / Mamiya 645 (optional)		Cine RAW 3181 Mbit/s	2560 x 1600		9.9 stops (-5.4, +4.5)				1455 (1080p2570)

== Still cameras with video mode ==
Brand	Camera	Sensor size	Lens Mount	Recording media	Maximum video resolution	Native ISO	Dynamic range (native/peak ISO)	Shutter type	Frame rate(s^{−1})	Codec
Canon	1D Mark IV	27.9 x 18.6 mm	Canon EF	CF card, SD card	1920 x 1080		11.2 stops (-7, +4.3)	Rolling	23.976, 25, 29.97 (50, 59.94)	H.264
Canon	1D X	36 x 24 mm	Canon EF	CF card	1920 x 1080			Rolling	24, 25, 30 (50, 60)	MPEG4
Canon	1D C	36 x 24 mm	Canon EF	CF card	4096 x 2160		11.7 stops	Rolling	24, 25, 30 (50, 60)	MPEG4
Canon	5D Mark II	36 x 24 mm	Canon EF	CF card	1920 x 1080	160	11.2 stops (-7, +4.2)	Rolling	24, 25, 30	H.264
Canon	5D Mark III	36 x 24 mm	Canon EF	CF card, SD card, HDMI recorder	1920 x 1080	160	11.2 stops 11.6 stops (sensor Raw)	Rolling	24, 25, 30	H.264 90 Mbit/s (internal recording), uncompressed signal (HDMI recording)
Canon	6D	35.8 x 23.9mm	Canon EF	SD card	1920 x 1080	160		Rolling	24, 25, 30 (50,60)	H.264 90 Mbit/s
Canon	7D	22.3 x 14.9 mm	Canon EF/EF-S	CF card	1920 x 1080	160	11 stops (-5.5, +5.4)	Rolling	24, 25, 30 (50,60)	H.264
Canon	7D Mark II	22.3 x 14.9 mm	Canon EF/EF-S	CF card, SD card	1920 x 1080	160		Rolling	24, 25, 30 (50,60)	H.264
Canon	60D	22.3 x 14.9 mm	Canon EF/EF-S	SD card	1920 x 1080	160		Rolling	24, 25, 30	H.264
Canon	550D	22.3 x 14.9 mm	Canon EF/EF-S	SD card	1920 x 1080			Rolling	24, 25, 30	H.264
Canon	600D	22.3 x 14.9 mm	Canon EF/EF-S	SD card	1920 x 1080			Rolling	24, 25, 30	H.264
Canon	650D	22.3 x 14.9 mm	Canon EF/EF-S	SD card	1920 x 1080			Rolling	24, 25, 30	H.264
Canon	700D	22.3 x 14.9 mm	Canon EF/EF-S	SD card	1920 x 1080			Rolling	24, 25, 30	H.264
Canon	750D	22.3 x 14.9 mm	Canon EF/EF-S	SD card	1920 x 1080			Rolling	24, 25, 30	H.264
Nikon	D3100	23.1 x 15.4 mm	Nikon F	SD card	1920 x 1080			Rolling	24 (24, 25, 30)	MPEG4
Nikon	D3200	23.2 x 15.4 mm	Nikon F	SD card	1920 x 1080			Rolling	24, 25, 30	MPEG4
Nikon	D4	36.0 x 23.9 mm	Nikon F	CF card, XQD card	1920 x 1080			Rolling	24, 25, 30 (50, 60)	H.264/MPEG4 24 Mbit/s
Nikon	D5100	23.6 x 15.7 mm	Nikon F	SD card	1920 x 1080			Rolling	24, 25, 30	MPEG4
Nikon	D7000	23.6 x 15.7 mm	Nikon F	SD card	1920 x 1080		10.2 stops (-6.7, +3.6)	Rolling	24 (24, 25, 30)	MPEG4
Nikon	D750	35.9 x 24 mm	Nikon F	SD card, 8-bit uncompressed 4:2:2 via HDMI	1920 x 1080			Rolling	24, 25, 30, 50, 60	H.264/MPEG4, ~38 Mbit/s
Nikon	D800	35.9 x 24 mm	Nikon F	CF card, SD card	1920 x 1080			Rolling	24, 25, 30 (50, 60)	H.264/MPEG4 24 Mbit/s
Panasonic	DMC-G3	17.3 x 13 mm	Micro Four Thirds	SD card	1920 x 1080				60 (60, 30)	AVCHD
Panasonic	DMC-GF2	17.3 x 13 mm	Micro Four Thirds	SD card	1920 x 1080				60 (60, 30)	AVCHD
Panasonic	DMC-GF3	17.3 x 13 mm	Micro Four Thirds	SD card	1920 x 1080				60 (60, 30)	AVCHD
Panasonic	DMC-GH1	18.89 x 14.48 mm	Micro Four Thirds	SD card	1920 x 1080				30	AVCHD
Panasonic	DMC-GH2	18.89 x 14.48 mm	Micro Four Thirds	SD card	1920 x 1080				24, 60 (30)	AVCHD 22 Mbit/s
Panasonic	DMC-GH3	17.3 x 13 mm	Micro Four Thirds	SD card	1920 x 1080				24, 60 (30)	H.264, AVCHD 2 (All-I, IPB) 22-72 Mbit/s
Panasonic	DMC-GH4	17.3 x 13 mm	Micro Four Thirds	SD card	4096 x 2160	200	11 stops	Rolling	24, 60 (30)	H.264, AVCHD 2 (All-I, IPB) 10-200 Mbit/s
Panasonic	DC-GH5	17.3 x 13 mm	Micro Four Thirds	SD card	4992 x 3744	400	11.5 stops	Rolling	24, 25, 30, 50, 60 (up to 180 at 1920x1080)	AVCHD / H.264 / H.265 (10bit color and 4:2:2 chroma subsampling)
Panasonic	DC-GH5S	19.2 x 13 mm	Micro Four Thirds	SD card	4096 x 2160	400 and 2500(800, 5000 in V-Log)			2-60 (4K) 2-180 (HD)	AVCHD / H.264 / H.265 (10bit color and 4:2:2 chroma subsampling) max. 400 Mbit/s
Panasonic	DC-S1H	35.6 x 23.8mm	L-mount	SD card	5952 x 3968	640 and 4000	12.7 stops (iso 640) 12.3 stops (iso 4000)		24, 25, 30, 48, 50, 60, 100, 120, 180	AVCHD / H.264 / H.265
Pentax	K-01	23.4 x 15.6 mm	Pentax K	SD-Card	1920 x 1080				30p, 25p	M-JPEG 95 Mbit/s
Pentax	K-3 III	23.3 x 15.5 mm	Pentax K	SD-Card	3840 x 2160	100		Rolling	30p, 24p (60p, 30p, 24p)	H264
Pentax	K-30	23.7 x 15.7 mm	Pentax K	SD-Card	1920 x 1080				30p (25p, 24p)	H264
Pentax	K-5	23.4 x 15.6 mm	Pentax K	SD-Card	1920 x 1080				30p, 25p	M-JPEG 95 Mbit/s
Samsung	NX20	23.5 x 15.7 mm	Samsung NX		1920 x 1080				30	H.264
Sony	DSLR-A560	23.5 x 15.6 mm	Sony A-mount		1920 x 1080				60, 29.97 (30)	MPEG4
Sony	DSLR-A580	23.5 x 15.6 mm	Sony A-mount		1920 x 1080				60, 29.97 (30)	MPEG4
Sony	NEX-5	23.4 x 15.6 mm	E-mount		1920 x 1080			Rolling	60 (30)	AVCHD
Sony	NEX-5N	23.4 x 15.6 mm	E-mount		1920 x 1080			Rolling	60 (30)	AVCHD
Sony	NEX-7	23.4 x 15.6 mm	E-mount		1920 x 1080			Rolling	60, 29.97 (30) NTSC; 50, 25 PAL	AVCHD/MPEG4
Sony	SLT-A33	23.5 x 15.6 mm	Sony A-mount		1920 x 1080				60, 29.97 (30)	MPEG4
Sony	SLT-A35	23.5 x 15.6 mm	Sony A-mount		1920 x 1080				60, 29.97 (30)	MPEG4
Sony	SLT-A37	23.5 x 15.6 mm	Sony A-mount		1920 x 1080				60, 29.97 (30)	?
Sony	SLT-A55	23.5 x 15.6 mm	Sony A-mount		1920 x 1080				60, 29.97 (30)	MPEG4
Sony	SLT-A57	23.5 x 15.6 mm	Sony A-mount		1920 x 1080				60, 29.97 (30) (NTSC countries); 50, 25 (PAL countries)	AVCHD/MPEG4
Sony	SLT-A65	23.5 x 15.6 mm	Sony A-mount		1920 x 1080				60, 29.97 (30)	MPEG4
Sony	SLT-A77	23.5 x 15.6 mm	Sony A-mount		1920 x 1080				60, 29.97 (30) (NTSC countries); 50, 25 (PAL countries)	AVCHD
Sony	SLT-A99	35.8 x 23.8 mm	Sony A-mount		1920 x 1080				60, 29.97 (30)	AVCHD
Sony	a7S	35.8 x 23.9 mm	Sony E-mount	SD card, Sony Memory Stick, 4K HDMI recorder	1920 x 1080 (internal recording); 3840 x 2160 (4K HDMI recorders)	3200	14.1 stops	Rolling	60, 29.97 (30)	AVCHD
Sony	a7S II	35.8 x 23.9 mm	Sony E-mount	SD card, Sony Memory Stick	3840 x 2160	50-409,600 (3200 native)		Rolling	23.98 - 30 (4K), 23.98 - 120 (1080p)	XAVC S, AVCHD, MP4

== See also ==
- List of 4K video recording devices
