= Lens fungus =

Infestation of a camera lens by fungus

Lens or camera fungus is the popular name for the infestation of optical devices such as lenses, low pass filter (OLPF) or the camera sensor, by fungal threads (mycelium). By germination of fungal spores and further spore formation, the infestation can spread beyond the initial fungal network. The sensor or glass surfaces of the lens are clouded by the fungal attack and lens coatings may be etched away. The fungus can range from small, barely visible points to an irregularly spreading mesh, to complete "blindness" of the optics.

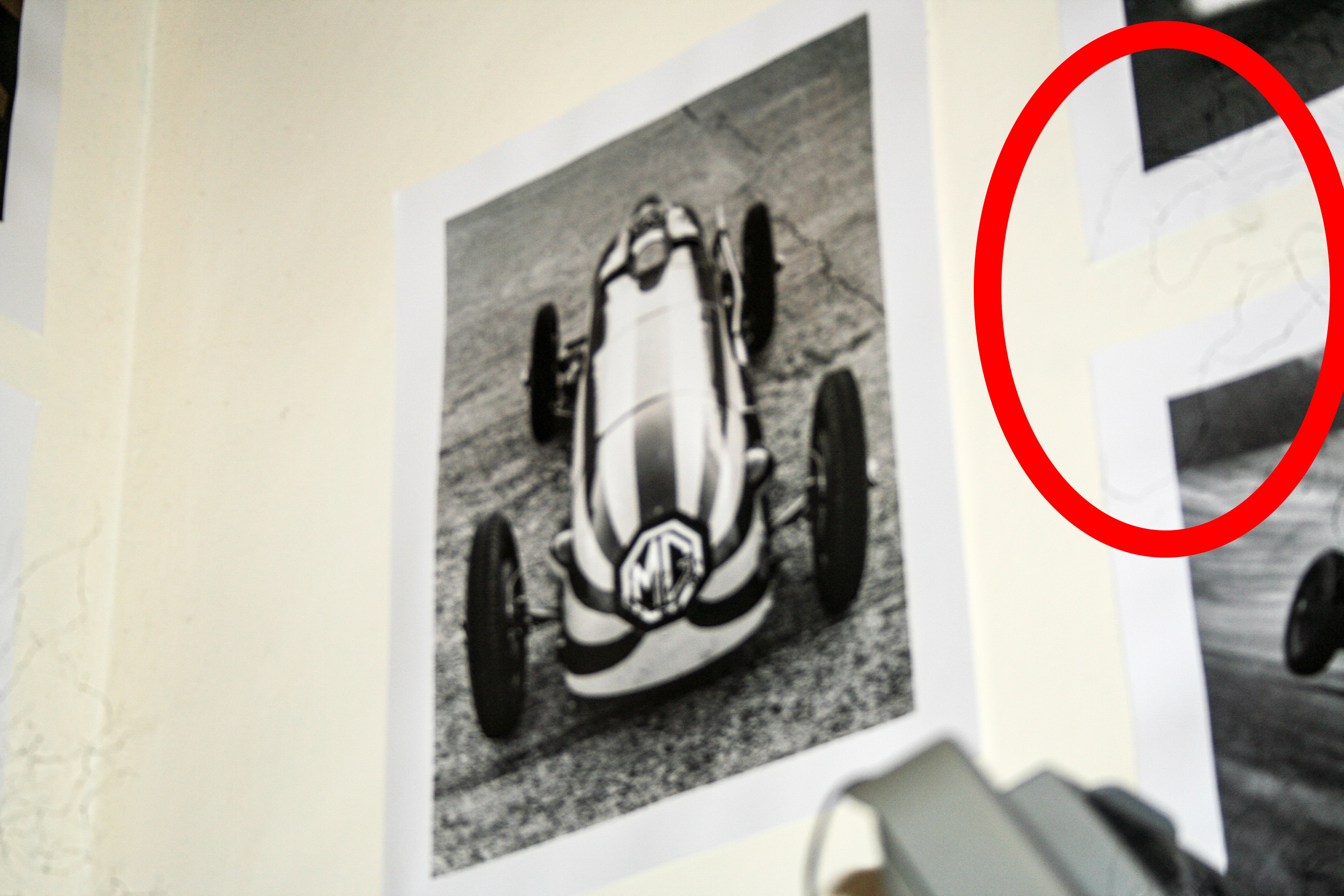
Example of an image from a camera with fungus in the low pass filter glass.

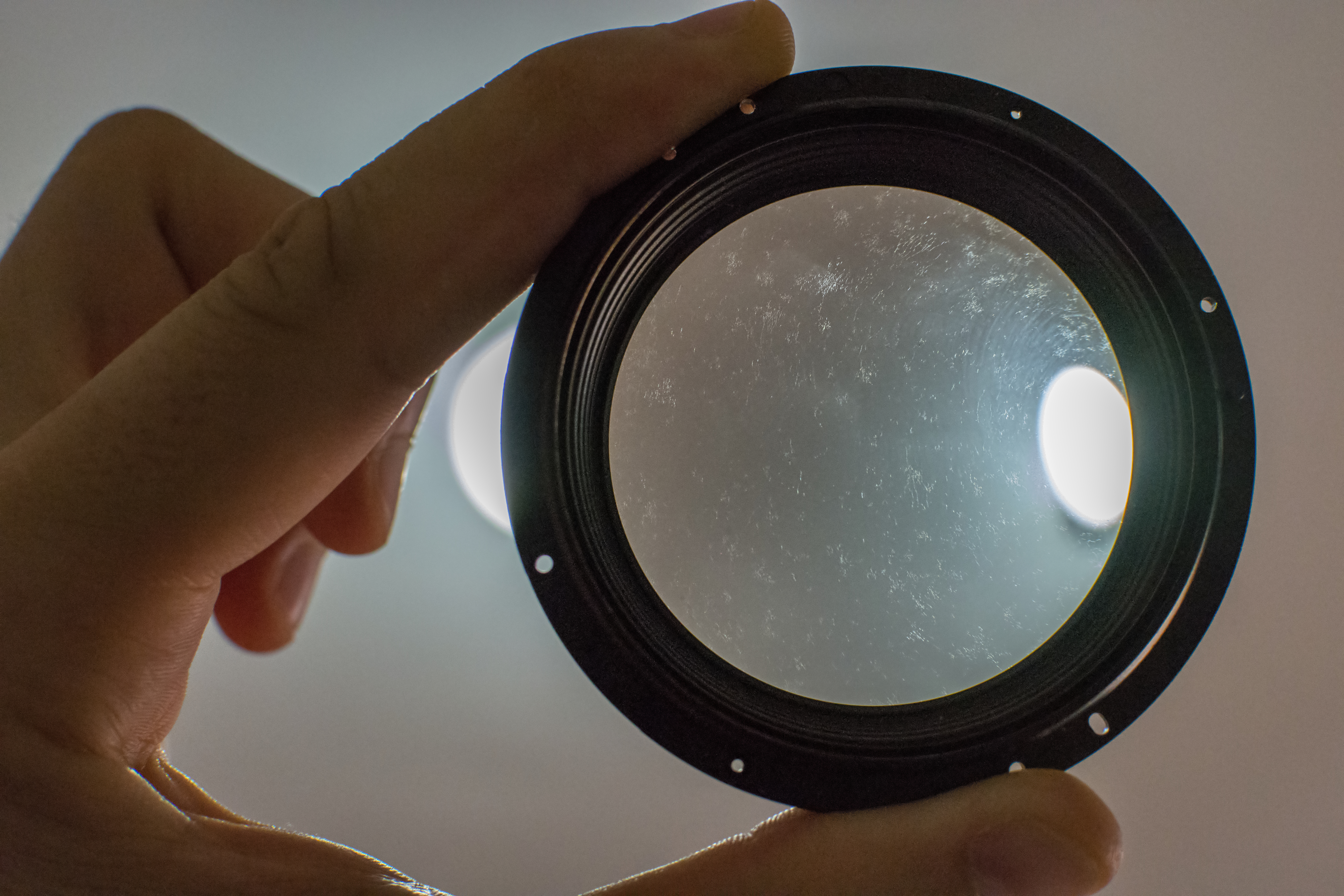
Lens from a wide-angle lens, completely overgrown with threads of fungus on the rear element

The fungi that attack surfaces belong to the groups of water mold (Oomycetes) and sac fungi (Ascomycota, especially the fungi imperfecti). "Lens fungus" is not a specific type of fungus.

== Food source, and growth ==
The lens fungus does not feed on the glass itself, but on materials that were used in the manufacture of the optics and/or that adhere to it (leather, paint, wood, putty, adhesives, fibers). Lens surfaces can be attacked if organic material has deposited on them, such as fingerprints or vapors from plastics or grease. The fungus can also eat its way from the edge of the lens into a layer of cement between cemented lenses.

== Cleaning ==
The fungi can be cleaned from accessible lens surfaces under some circumstances, but irreparable damage to the affected glass surfaces can also occur from (often acidic) metabolic products of the fungus.

Cleaning can range from being easy to being very difficult, depending on whether and how the glass has been surface treated. In the case of more expensive lenses, it is sometimes advisable to ask the manufacturer or an optical expert to do the work.

In the case of uncoated non-optical glass, such as glass panes and drinking glasses, similar fungal glass damage or clouding of the glass due to periodically changing humidity and dryness can sometimes be remedied by cleaning the glass with a mixture of vinegar and salt. The glass must be thoroughly rubbed with the mixture, then rinsed with water, and then finally polished with a clean cloth.

== Prevention ==
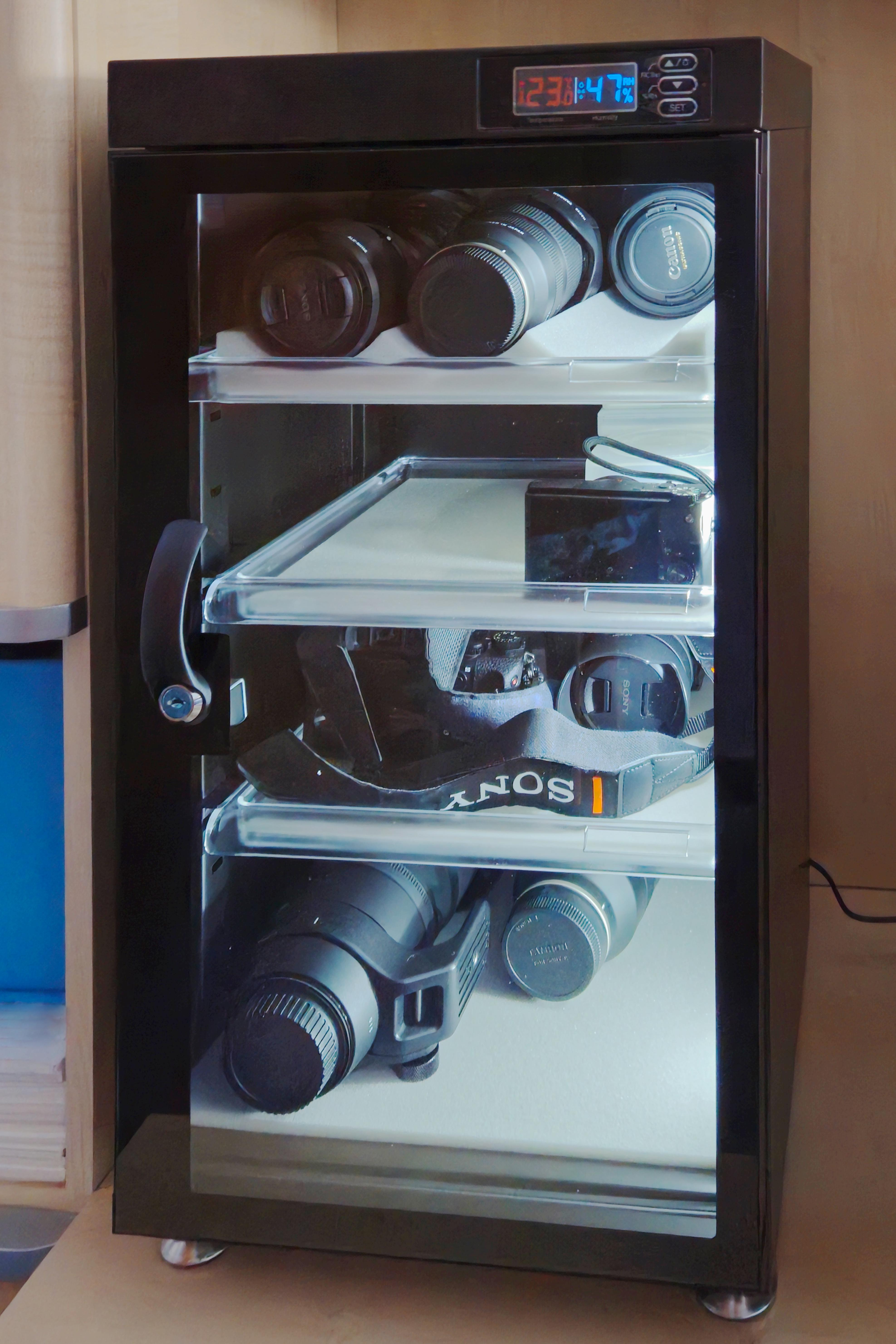
Dry cabinet for cameras and lenses

Proper storage of optical devices can prevent fungal growth. The fungus thrives at temperatures of 10C to 35C and relative humidity of 70% or more. Thus, dry and warm storage is recommended, but the temperature should not exceed 50C, and the humidity should not be below 30%, as this could damage the optics. The development of the fungus is also hindered by light.

- The relative humidity should be between 30% and 60%.
- A temperature of around 40C is preferred to prevent fungal growth.
- Optical devices should be dried if necessary before they are packed up, or stored with desiccant.
- The surfaces of the front and rear lenses should be kept free from dust, fibers and other organic material, so as not to provide nutrition for fungus.
- Light and adequate ventilation should be provided.
