= UV filter =

Camera parts, features and technologies

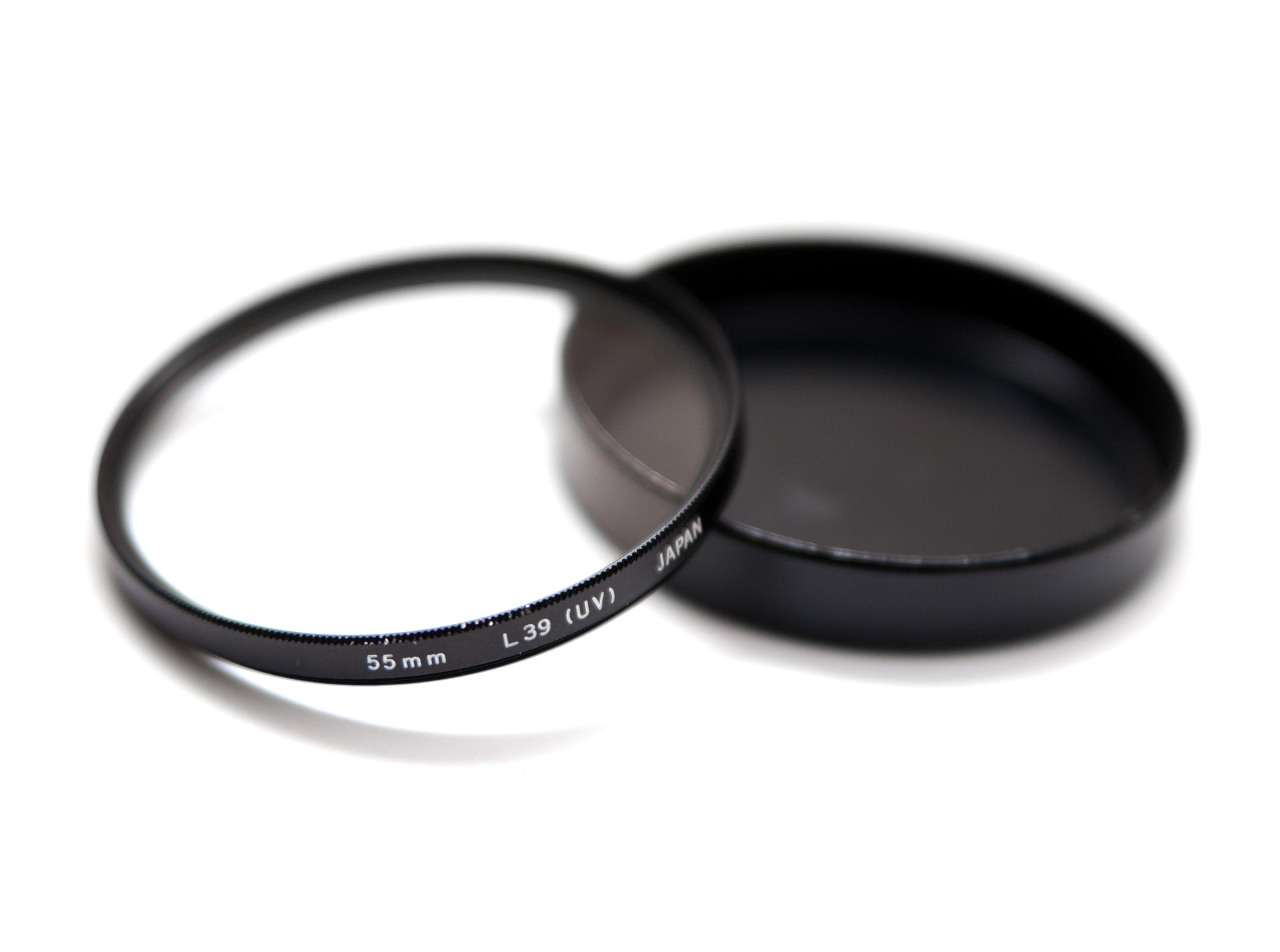
An L39 UV filter with a 55mm filter thread

UV filters are compounds, mixtures, or materials that block or absorb ultraviolet (UV) light. One of the major applications of UV filters is their use as sunscreens to protect skin from sunburn and other sunlight- or UV-related damage.

UV filters have been used to coat glass discs fitted to camera lenses to protect hardware that is sensitive to UV light.

== Background ==
Earlier types of photographic film were quite sensitive to UV light, which used to cause haziness or fogginess, and a bluish hue in color film. UV filters were used to filter out shorter ultraviolet wavelengths while remaining transparent to visible light. However, the modern-day photographic film and digital cameras are less sensitive to UV wavelengths.

UV filters are sometimes referred to as L37 or L39 filters, depending on the wavelengths of light they filter out. For example, an L37 filter removes ultraviolet light with wavelengths shorter than 370 nanometers (nm), whereas an L39 filter eliminates light with wavelengths shorter than 390 nm.

== Applications in printing and photography ==
UV filters span the color spectrum and are used for a wide variety of applications. So-called Ortho Red and Deep Ortho Red lights are commonly used in diffusion transfer, in typesetting film or paper, and other applications dealing with orthochromatic materials. Yellow Gold, Yellow, Lithostar Yellow, and Fuji Yellow filters or safelights provide safe workspaces for contact proofing applications like screen printing and plate making. Pan Green, Infrared Green, and Dark Green filters or safelights are commonly used in scanning applications, work with panchromatic film, papers, and X-rays.

Many photographers and cinematographers still use UV filters to protect their lenses' glass and coating. However, UV filters, as with any optical filter, may introduce lens flare and harm contrast and sharpness. Hoods can counteract this, as they offer some protection against impact and shade optical elements, thus preventing lens flare. Also, quality UV filters offer some protection against lens contamination while minimizing the inherent additional distortion.

In photography, the term "UV filter" can also be misused as a filter that passes UV light while blocking other wavelengths in the light spectrum, in the same way, the term "IR filter" is used for filtering the entire spectrum. The correct name for such filters are "UV pass filter" and "IR pass filter" respectively, and they are only used in very specialized photography.

== Applications in personal care products ==
Since excessive UV radiation can cause sunburn, photoaging, and skin cancer, care products such as sunscreen usually include a classification for the specific wavelengths they filter. UV classifications include UVA (320-400 nm), UVB (290-320 nm) and UVC (200-280 nm). UV-absorbing compounds are used not only in sunscreen, but also in other personal care products, such as lipstick, shampoo, hair spray, body wash, toilet soap, and insect repellent. Chemical filters protect against UV radiation by absorbing, reflecting, or scattering it. Reflection and scattering are accomplished by inorganic physical UV filters, such as titanium dioxide (TiO_{2}) and zinc oxide (ZnO). Absorption, mainly of UVB, is done by organic UV filters, which are known as chemical UV filters. The levels of UV filters in sunscreens typically vary from 0.5% to 10%, although they sometimes reach 25%.

=== Examples of organic UV filters ===
Many different organic compounds can serve as UV filters. They fall into several structural classes:

- Benzophenones
  - Benzophenone-3 (BP3)
  - Benzophenone-4 (BP4)
- Salicylates
  - Homosalate (HMS)
  - 2-ethylhexyl salicylate (EHS)
- p-Aminobenzoic acid and derivatives
  - Ethylhexyl dimethyl PABA (OD-PABA)
  - 4-p-aminobenzoic acid (PABA)
- Benzimidazole derivatives
  - Phenylbenzimidazole sulfonic acid (PMDSA)
  - Disodium phenyl dibenzimidazole tetrasulfonate (bisdisulizole disodium)
- Triazines
  - Ethylhexyltriazone (OT)
  - Diethylhexyl butamido triazone (DBT)
  - Bis-ethylhexyloxyphenol methoxyphenyl triazine (EMT)
- Phenolic benzotriazoles
  - Drometrizole trisiloxane (DRT)
  - Methylene bis-benzotriazolyl tetramethylbutylphenol (MBP, biscotrizole)
- Dibenzoylmethane derivatives
  - 4-tert-Butyl-4’-methoxydibenzoylmethane (BM-DBM, avobenzone)
- Cinnamates
  - Ethylhexyl methoxycinnamate (OMC)
  - Isoamyl p-methoxycinnamate (IMC, amiloxate)
- Camphor derivatives
  - Terephtalydene dicamphor sulfonic acid (PDSA)
  - 3-benzylidene camphor (3BC)
  - Benzylidene camphor sulfonic acid (BCSA)
  - 4-methylbenzylidene camphor (4-MBC)
  - Polyacrylamidomethyl benzylidene camphor (PBC)
  - Camphor benzalkonium methosulfate (CBM)

== Environmental aspects ==
The use of UV filters has increased recently due to growing concern about UV radiation and skin cancer, especially as a result of ozone depletion, which in turn has caused concern for its environmental impact.

The filter material can enter the environment either directly, through industrial wastewater discharge, or indirectly, through domestic water discharge during showering, bathing, urine excretion or through wastewater treatment. Wastewater treatment plants (WWTP) are not very effective at removing these contaminants. Several UV filters have been detected at ppb or ppt levels in surface water and wastewater, with maximum concentrations in the summertime.

Because most UV filters are lipophilic, they tend to bioaccumulate in aquatic environments and food chains originating from them. Confirming bioaccumulation, several studies have shown the presence of UV filters in aquatic organisms. The 4-methyl-benzylidene camphor was detected in the muscle tissue of trout in Swiss and German waters, while traces of Ethylhexyl methoxycinnamate and octocrylene were found in shellfish in the Mediterranean and Atlantic coasts of France. Furthermore, eighteen organic sunscreens were found in sediments of Japanese rivers and lakes, at concentrations ranging from 2 to about 3000 ng/g. The accumulation of organic UV filters in living organisms is of major concern because some of them (and their metabolites) can act as endocrine disruptors both in vitro and in vivo. Also, Goksøyr et al. (2009) reported concentrations of organic UV-filters in open waters of the Pacific Ocean, providing evidence of the persistence and wide dispersion of these components in the marine environment.

Because UV-filters are not always stable under environmental conditions, it is common for them to transform into other compounds. Water in natural reservoirs, for example, is subjected to sun irradiation, while swimming-pool water is often disinfected by chlorination, bromination, ozonation, or UV irradiation. These byproducts can often be more toxic than the original UV filter. For example, avobenzone transforms in the presence of chlorinated disinfection products and UV radiation, producing substituted chlorinated phenols and acetophenones, which are known for their toxicity.

Some organic UV filters under UV radiation can generate reactive oxygen species (ROS) (OH, H_{2}O_{2}) (e.g. BP-3, octocrylene (OCR), octyl methoxycinnamate (OMC), phenyl benzimidazole sulfonic acid (PBS, PABA, etc.). Some studies have recorded increased hydrogen peroxide or H_{2}O_{2} levels in beaches directly attributable to UV filter transformation. H_{2}O_{2} is responsible for damaging lipids, proteins, and DNA, and generating high stress levels in marine organisms. Inorganic UV-filters (i.e. TiO_{2}) can also generate ROS, another compound toxic for marine phytoplankton.

=== Coral bleaching ===
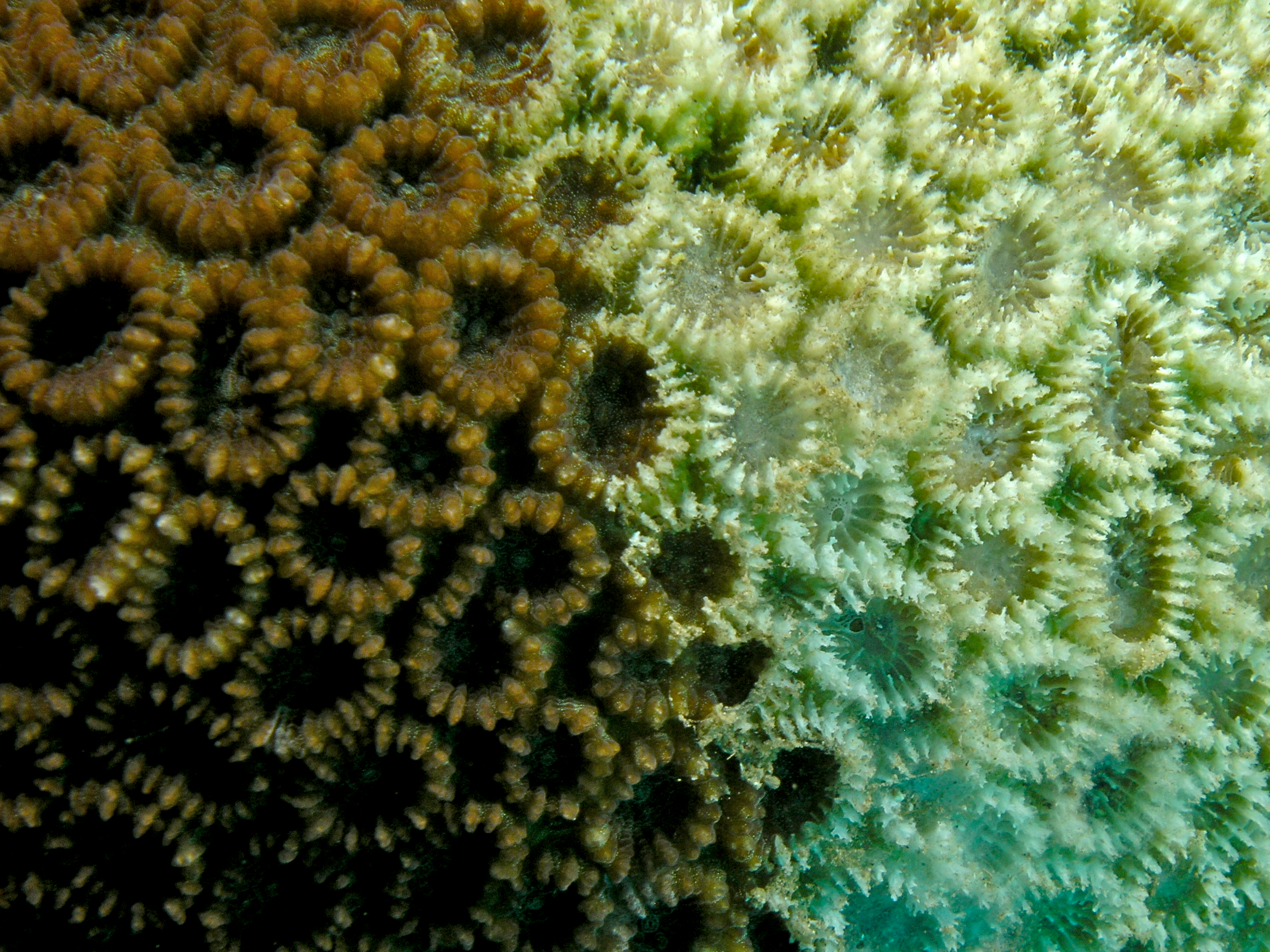
Dipsastraea pallida (hard coral) with signs of bleaching or crown-of-thorns starfish damage

UV filters have shown severe effects on coral reefs due to the bleaching of corals at very low concentrations. As a result, small quantities of sunscreens result in the production of large amounts of coral mucus within 18-48 hrs and bleaching of hard corals within 96 hrs. Among the UV filters that result in coral bleaching according to studies are Ethylhexyl methoxycinnamate, benzophenone-3, and 4-methyl benzylidene camphor, even in very low concentrations. Bleaching was favored by higher temperatures which act as synergistic factors. Experiments showed that the coral bleaching was not dose-dependent, so it can occur upon exposure to very small amounts.

According to the rough estimate of 78 million tourists per year in coral reef areas, the estimated amount of sunscreen used annually in tropical countries ranges between 16,000 and 25,000 tons. 25% of this amount is washed off during bathing activities, leading to a release of 4,000-6,000 tons/year in the reef areas. This results in threatening 10% of the world reefs by sunscreen induced coral bleaching alone. Sunscreens can significantly enhance viral production in seawater.

== Mechanisms of transformation ==
Photolysis of benzophenone-3 in presence of benzotriazole

=== Photolysis ===
Photolysis is the main abiotic route for the transformation of UV filters. Photolysis dissociates organic filters into free radicals.

Photolysis can be direct or indirect. The direct way occurs when the chromophore of the organic filter absorbs sunlight at certain wavelengths. The indirect pathway occurs in the presence of a photosensitizer. Dissolved organic matter (DOM) in surface waters acts as a photo-sensitizer and produces reactive photo-oxidation such as hydroxyl radicals, peroxyl radicals, and singlet oxygen.

The photolysis of sunscreen products is more complicated than the behavior of individual UV filters, as shown by this example. In the presence of other UV filters, Benzotriazole, and humic acids, Benzophenone -3 degradation was observed through the loss of hydroxyl and benzoyl functional groups resulting in the formation of 2,4 dimethyl anisole.

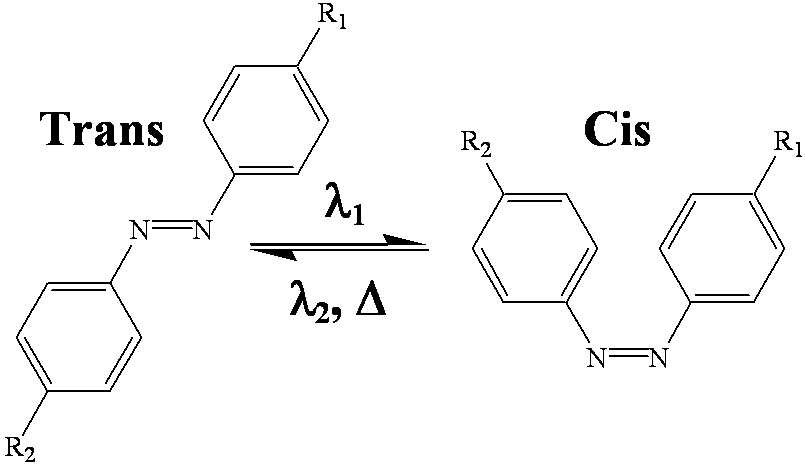
Photoisomerism

=== Photoisomerization ===
Photoisomerization can result in products that absorb less UV light than their parent compound. This is evidenced by cinnamates, salicylates, benzylidine camphor, and dibenzoylmethane derivatives. Octyl methoxycinnamate (OMC) can undergo photoisomerization, photodegradation, and photodimerization to obtain several dimers and cyclodimers isomers. Most commercial products are trans isomers but exist in the environment as a mixture of trans and cis isomers upon exposure to UV radiation due to the presence of the C=C double bond adjacent to the aromatic rings. The isomers may have identical physicochemical properties, but they may differ in biological behavior and effects.

=== Disinfection by-product ===
Swimming pool water is usually disinfected by chlorination, bromination, ozonation, or UV radiation. Upon the presence of some UV filters such as avobenzone in swimming pools, these can break down and create disinfection by-products, including toxic products, as a result of the interaction between avobenzone and the active chlorine and UV radiation.

== Fate of some organic UV filters ==
=== Benzophenones ===
Metabolic pathway of Benzophenone-3

Benzophenones (BPs) are widely used in UV filters, fragrance enhancers, and plastic additives. The major sources of BP-3 are reported to be human recreational activities and wastewater treatment plant (WWTP) effluents. The anionic forms of both BP-3 and 4-OH-BP3 can undergo direct photodegradation. The photolytic rates of both compounds in natural waters are faster than those in pure water. Radical scavenging experiments revealed that triplet-excited dissolved organic matter (3DOM*) was responsible for the indirect photodegradation of BP-3 and 4-OH-BP3 in seawater, whereas, in freshwater, the indirect photodegradation of these two compounds was attributed to dissolved organic matter and OH radical.

=== p-Aminobenzoic acid (PABA) ===
Indirect photolysis of p-aminobenzoic acid UV filter in water

p-Aminobenzoic acid was one of the earliest UV filters used in sunscreens (1943). It was used in concentrations up to 5%. It was discovered by 1982 that PABA increases the formation of a particular DNA defect in human cells. The photochemical fate of PABA may be impacted by water constituents, e.g., NO_{3}^{−}, dissolved organic matter (DOM), and HCO_{3}^{−}. PABA undergoes both direct and indirect photolysis in the solution with the presence of NO_{3}. Direct photolysis accounts for 25% of the degradation of PABA and is considered a secondary pathway. On the other hand, indirect photolysis was the dominant pathway.

Zhou and Mopper showed that nitrate enhanced the photodegradation of PABA by a factor of 2. However, in the presence of free radical scavengers such as carbonate forms and natural organic matter (NOM), the photodegradation of PABA decreased. It was proposed that the indirect photolysis of PABA was mainly due to the NO_{3} photolysis product •OH.

The Bicarbonate anion is abundant in water. Bicarbonate caused 10% of •OH scavenging. The reaction between bicarbonate and the •OH yields carbonate radical (•CO3), which is less reactive than •OH. In natural waters, •CO3 can reach a higher steady-state concentration than •OH because of its lower reactivity. The enhancement of PABA photolysis by bicarbonate is due to carbonate radicals.

Water-soluble NOM is composed of organic acids. These organic acids are mainly humic substances, which can be categorized into a fulvic and humic acid fraction. NOM favors the indirect photolysis of PABA by absorbing the sunlight and weakening its intensity.

Two reactions can take place during the degradation of PABA in the presence of nitrate in water as shown in the figure. Three of the four products contain phenolic groups and may thus be estrogenic. So the hazardous byproducts generated during the PABA photoreaction should be concerned for its estrogenicity.

=== 4-tert-butyl-4’-methoxydibenzoylmethane (avobenzone) ===
Avobenzone tautomeric forms

4-tert-Butyl-4’-methoxydibenzoylmethane, known as avobenzone, belongs to dibenzoylmethanes. It is one of the most common UVA (400-320 nm) filters used in sunscreens formulations. It is sold under the trade names Parsol 1789 or Eusolex 9020. Avobenzone exists in two tautomeric forms: enol and keto. In sunscreen formulations, avobenzone exists predominantly in the enol form, which has a maximum absorption at wavelengths ranging from 350 to 365 nm depending on the solvent used. The double bond of the enolic form was shown to be more reactive in conditions of aquatic chlorination than the aromatic ring. In a chlorinated aquatic environment, avobenzone transforms to two corresponding aldehydes and acids, as shown in the figure. Both aldehydes are formed as a result of the CO-CH_{2} bond. They are less stable in the oxidative conditions and easily transform into the corresponding acids.

Chlorinated acetophenone derivatives are also formed due to the cleavage of the same CO-CH_{2} bond. Chlorinated acetophenone derivatives are tear gases, trigger dermatitis, and some other health problems. It was reported that chlorination of the original avobenzone into the aromatic ring position is less possible. The cleavage of the CO-Ar bond results in the formation of 4-chloroanisole.

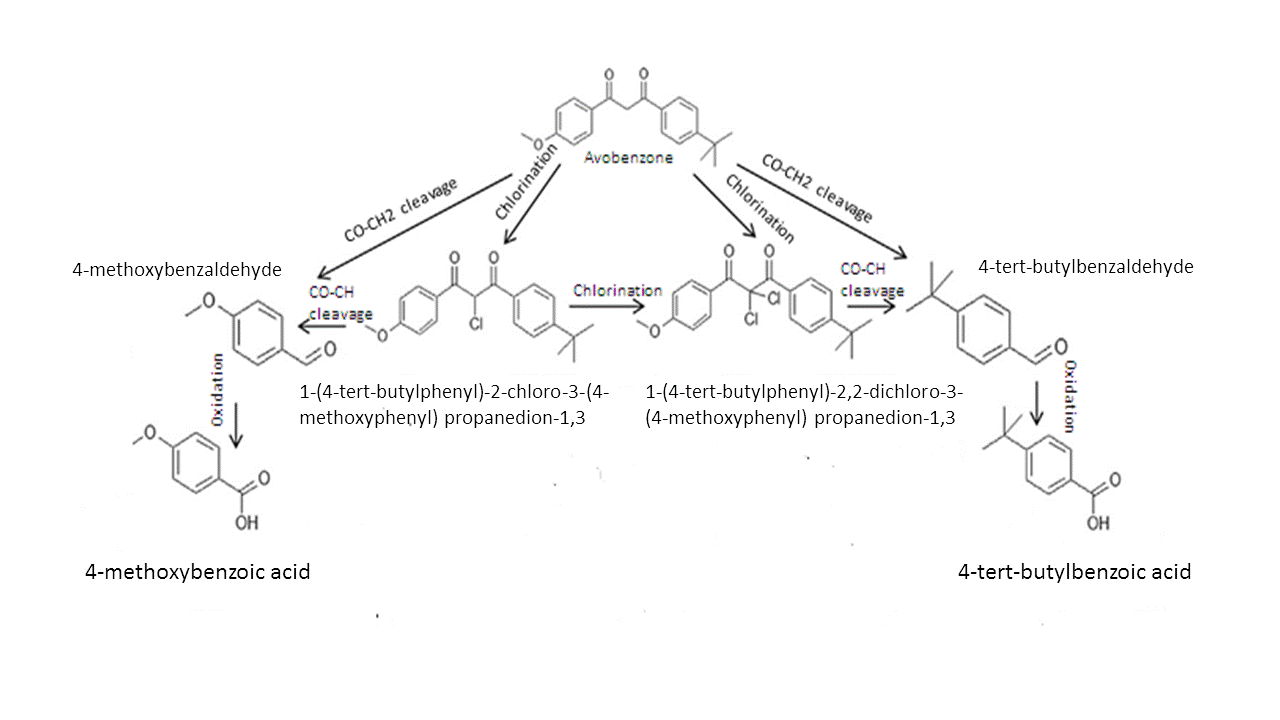
Avobenzone transformation products in chlorinated aquatic systems

=== Ethylhexyl methoxycinnamate (EHMC) ===
Ethylhexyl methoxycinnamate (EHMC) is one of the most common UVB filters used worldwide. It is known as Eusolex 2292 and Uvinul MC80. It is included in the High Production Volume Chemicals (HPVC) list, which includes chemicals produced or imported in the EU at a rate of more than 1000 tons per year. The lifetime of the EHMC was predicted to be from hours to a few days. EHMC is well tolerated by the skin. However, it has some side effects, including its ability to produce reactive oxygen species (ROS) and penetrate the human skin after exposure to UV light. EHMC has also been found in shellfish, fish, and cormorants at ng/g levels, which suggests that it can accumulate in the food chain. EHMC was proved to be responsible for coral bleaching by promoting viral infections. From the toxicological point of view, EHMC has estrogenic properties both in vitro and in vivo. For instance, exposure to this compound caused the increase of the uterus' weight for rats. Prenatal exposure to EHMC can affect both the reproductive and neurological development in the offspring of rats, which can be a cause for concern because humans are routinely exposed to this compound through the use of sunscreens and other cosmetics.

The main transformation pathway for EHMC is photolysis. Direct photolysis represents the dominant transformation pathway. On the other hand, the indirect photolysis due to OH is negligible and, due to dissolved organic matter, will be a secondary route. Four transformation products were detected for EHMC upon exposure to UV radiation. 4-methoxy benzaldehyde (MOBA) and 4-methoxy cinnamic acid are two transformation products of EHMC via dealkylation. The intermediate MOBA is more toxic than EHMC towards the bacteria.

== See also ==
- Photographic filter
