= Infrared cut-off filter =

Optical filters that block near-infrared while passing visible light

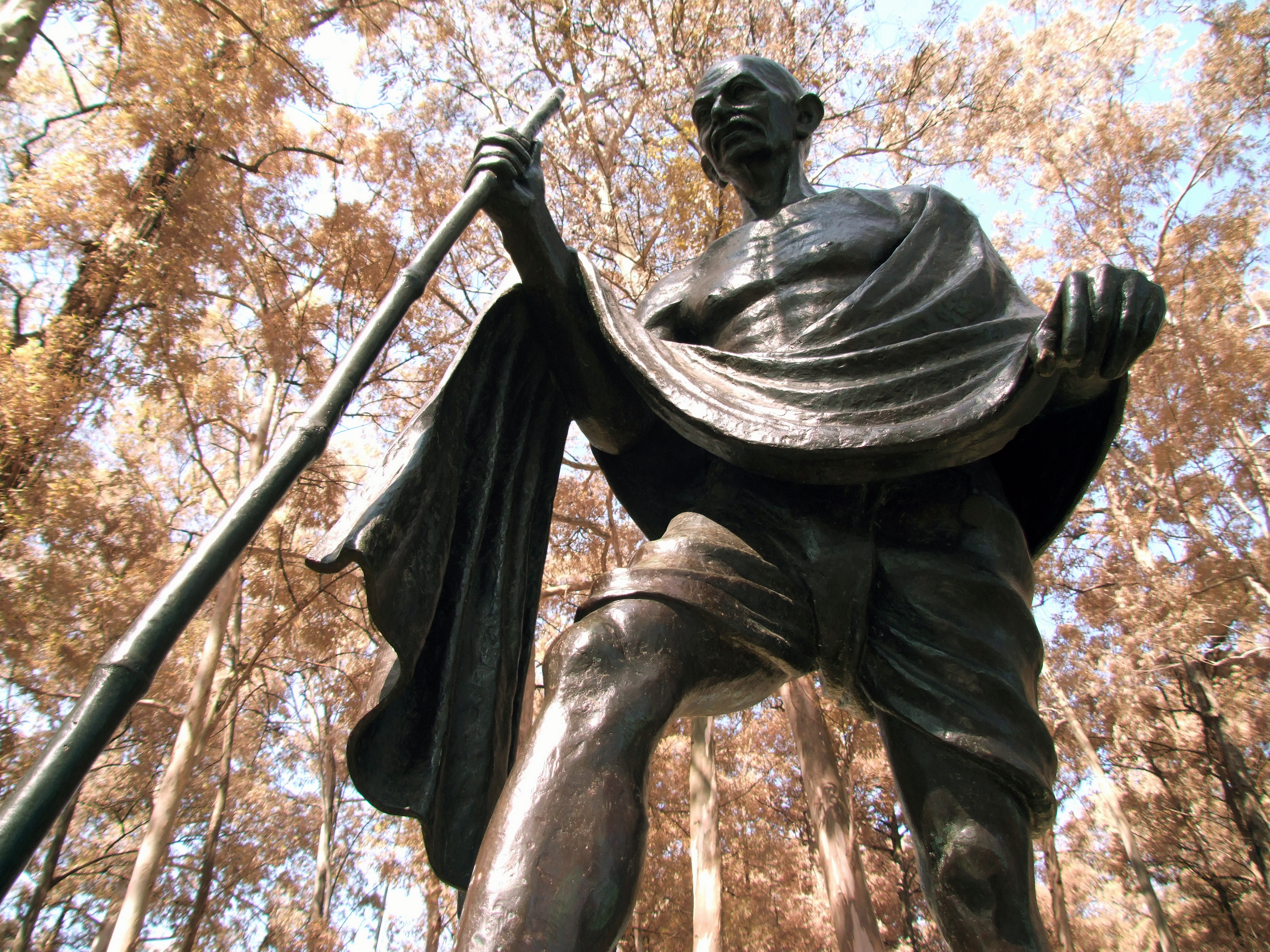
Infrared color photography, Mahatma Gandhi's statue

Infrared cut-off filters, sometimes called IR filters or heat-absorbing filters, are designed to reflect or block near-infrared wavelengths while passing visible light. They are often used in devices with bright incandescent light bulbs (such as slide and overhead projectors) to prevent unwanted heating. There are also filters which are used in solid state (CCD or CMOS) video cameras to block IR due to the high sensitivity of many camera sensors to near-infrared light. These filters typically have a blue hue to them as they also sometimes block some of the light from the longer red wavelengths.

== IR transmitting/passing filters in photography ==
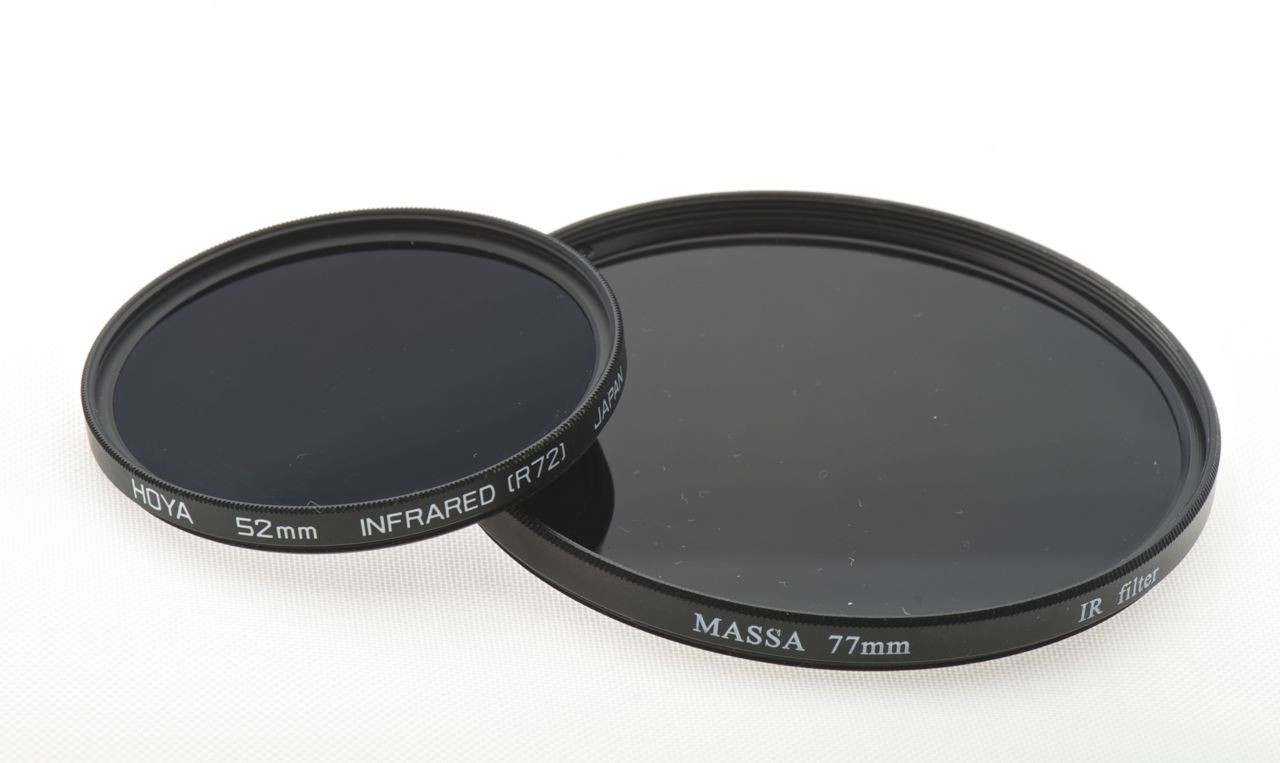
IR transmitting filters, used in photography.

In contrast to the naming convention of optical filters where the name of the filter denotes the wavelengths that are blocked, and in line with the convention for air filters and oil filters, photographic filters are named for the color of light they pass. Thus a blue filter makes the picture look blue. A blue filter marginally allows more light in the blue wavelength to pass resulting in a slight shift of the color temperature of the photo to a cooler color. Because of this, the term "IR filters" is commonly used to refer to filters that pass infrared light while completely blocking other wavelengths. However, in some applications the term "IR filter" still can be used as a synonym of infrared cut-off filter.

Unlike the eye, sensors based on silicon (including CCDs and CMOS sensors) have sensitivities extending into the near-infrared. Such sensors may extend to 1000 nm. Digital cameras are usually equipped with IR-blocking filters to prevent unnatural-looking images. IR-transmitting (passing) filters, or removal of factory IR-blocking filters, are commonly used in infrared photography to pass infrared light and block visible and ultraviolet light. Such filters appear black to the eye, but are transparent when viewed with an IR sensitive device.

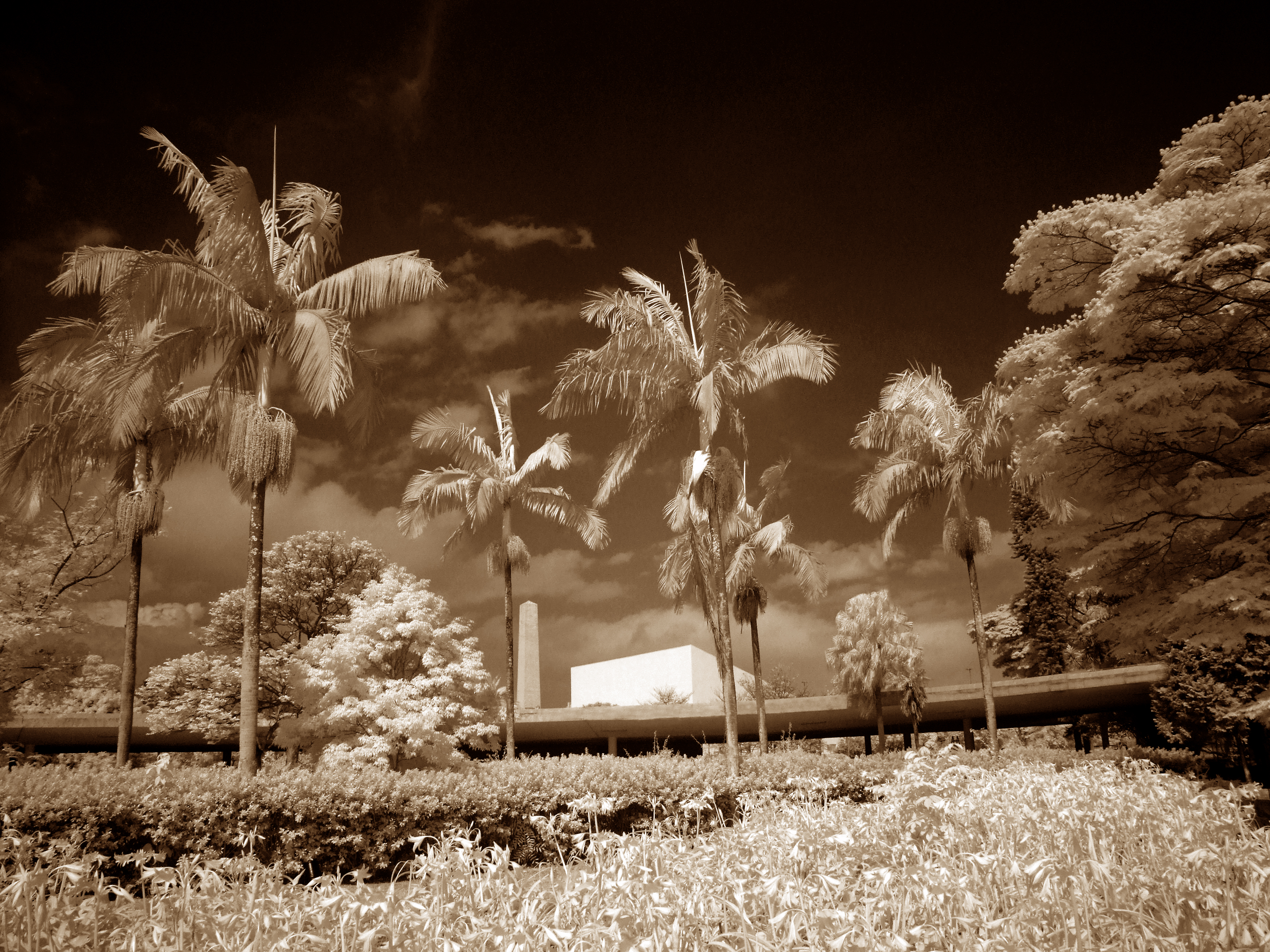
Infrared photography, Ibirapuera Park

Since the dyes in processed film block various part of visible light but are all fairly transparent to infrared, dark black sections of any processed film (where all visible colors are blocked) pass only infrared light and are commonly used (layering one over another if necessary for better visual light filtering) as a cheap alternative to expensive glass-backed filters. Such filters can be used both over color camera lenses, and to filter visible light from IR illumination sources. Such filter stock is most easily made available most simply by having any commercial color negative film developed after being fully exposed to light. The leaders of 35mm film are ideal for this, without wasting an entire roll of film. (Some special communication may be necessary in such submission, to ensure that all of the "black" negative film thus produced is indeed returned, and that there is no need to print the color-negative results on photographic paper). In the same way, visually opaque "black" color-positive film emulsions mounted in cardboard, as for routine slide projection, provide inexpensive cardboard-mounted infrared filters. Film sizes larger than 35 mm may be handled in the same way for larger filter production.

For astrophotography, many photogenic targets (such as emission nebulae) are bright in the far red and near infrared. Removal of factory filters increases sensitivity to such targets, and may also increase sharpness, as such filters may also include anti-aliasing filters.

== See also ==
- UV filter
- Cold mirror and Hot mirror
- Interference filter
