= Neutral-density filter =

Device in optics that reduces light intensity

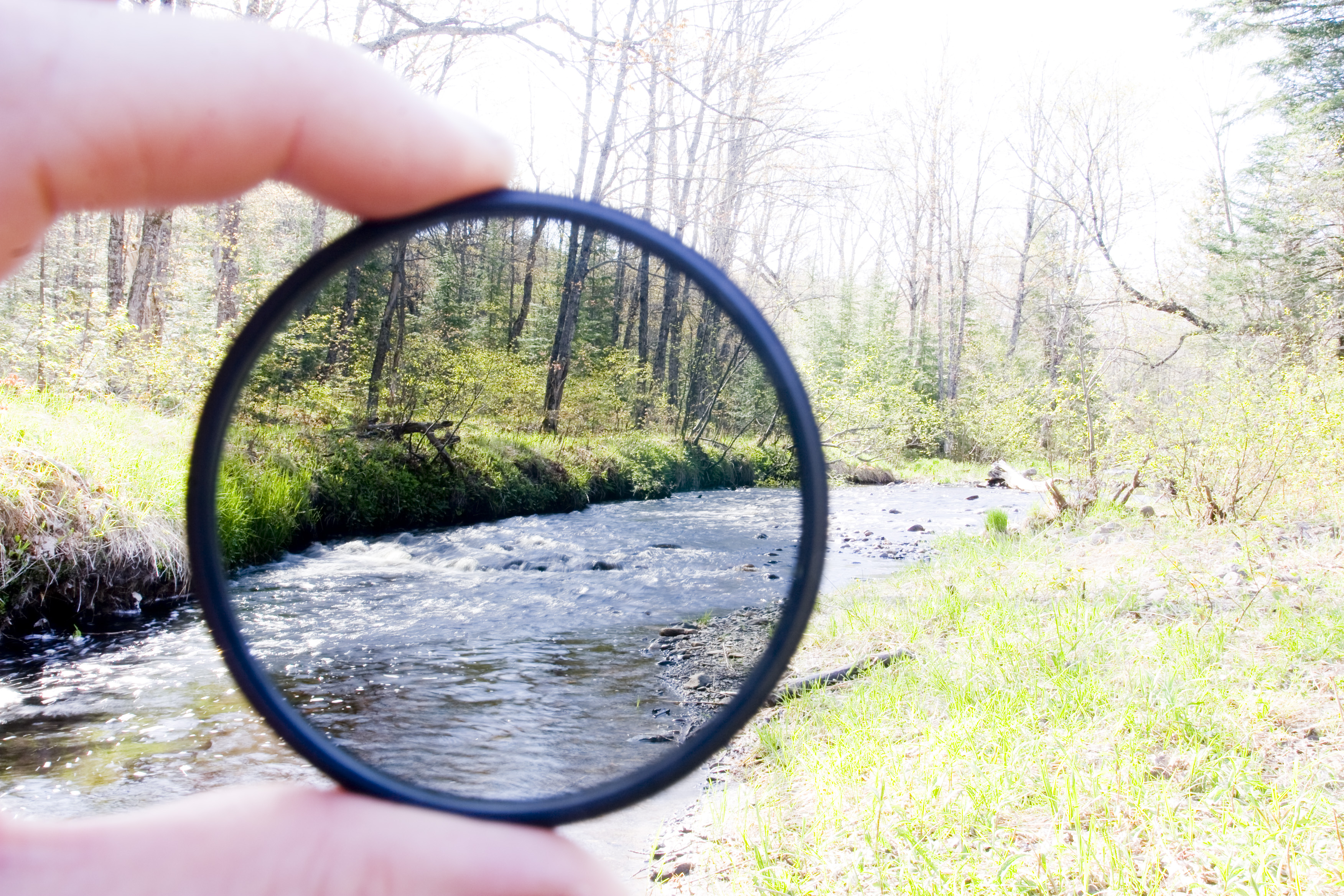
A demonstration of the effect of a neutral density filter. Note that the photograph was exposed for the view through the filter, and thus the remainder of the scene is overexposed. If the exposure had instead been set for the unfiltered background, it would appear properly exposed while the view through the filter would be dark.

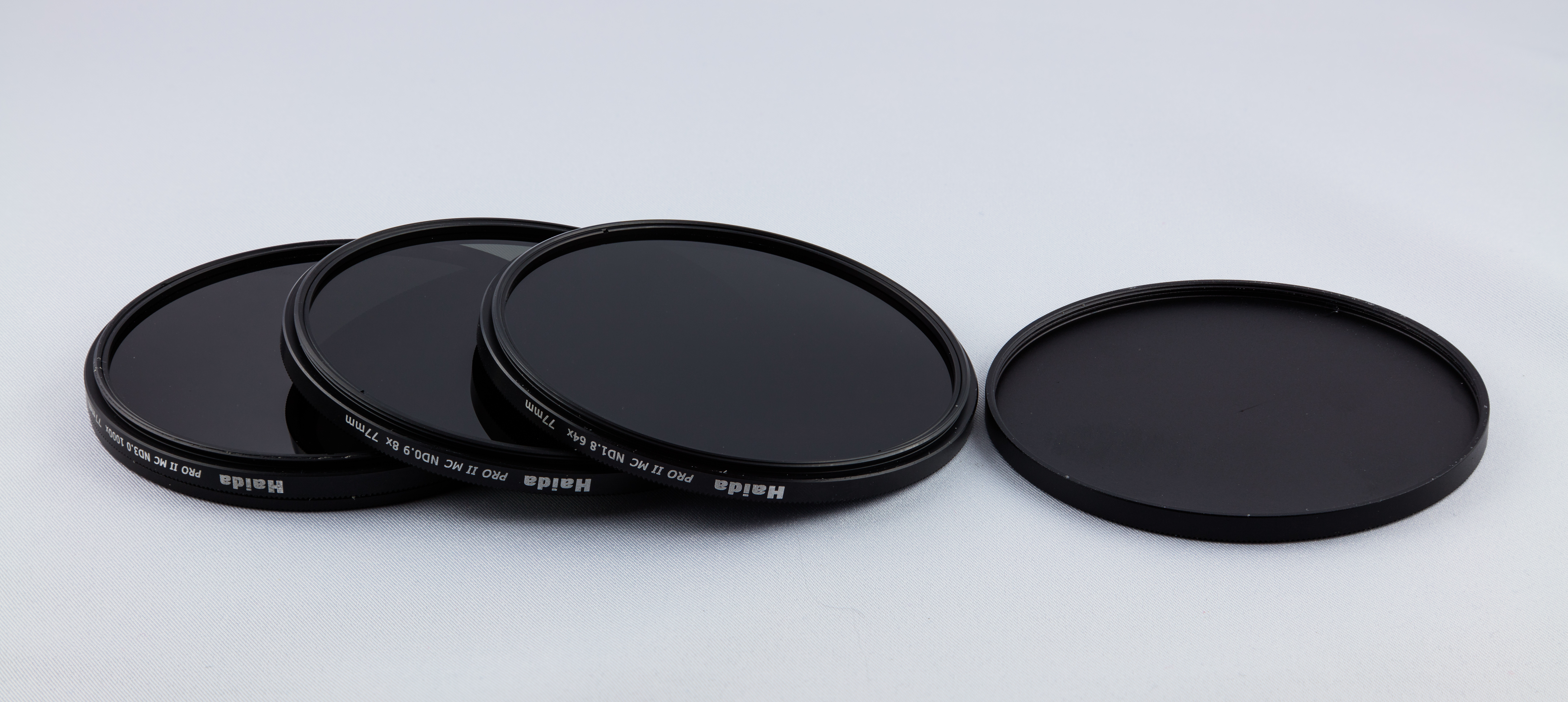
A set of ND filters

In photography and optics, a neutral-density filter, or ND filter, is a filter that reduces or modifies the intensity of all wavelengths, or colors, of light equally, giving no changes in hue of color rendition. It can be a colorless (clear) or grey filter, and is denoted by Wratten number 96. The purpose of a standard photographic neutral-density filter is to reduce the amount of light entering the lens. Doing so allows the photographer to select combinations of aperture, exposure time and sensor sensitivity that would otherwise produce overexposed pictures. This is done to achieve effects such as a shallower depth of field or motion blur of a subject in a wider range of situations and atmospheric conditions.

For example, one might wish to photograph a waterfall at a slow shutter speed to create a deliberate motion-blur effect. The photographer might determine that to obtain the desired effect, a shutter speed of ten seconds was needed. On a very bright day, there might be so much light that even at minimal film speed and a minimal aperture, the ten-second shutter speed would let in too much light, and the photo would be overexposed. In this situation, applying an appropriate neutral-density filter is the equivalent of stopping down one or more additional stops, allowing the slower shutter speed and the desired motion-blur effect.

== Mechanism ==
The term "neutral-density filter" refers to any filter that blocks a range of wavelengths evenly, so mechanisms and constructions vary. Reflective ND filters use thin coatings to reflect light. The coatings vary in composition, often consisting of metal ions, and can be specialized for use-case and spectrum. Absorptive filters change the composition of the glass itself, and may include an anti-reflective coating.

For an ND filter with optical density d, the fraction of the optical power transmitted through the filter can be calculated as

$$\text{Fractional transmittance} \equiv \frac{I}{I_0} = 10^{-d},$$

where I is the intensity after the filter, and I_{0} is the incident intensity.

== Uses ==
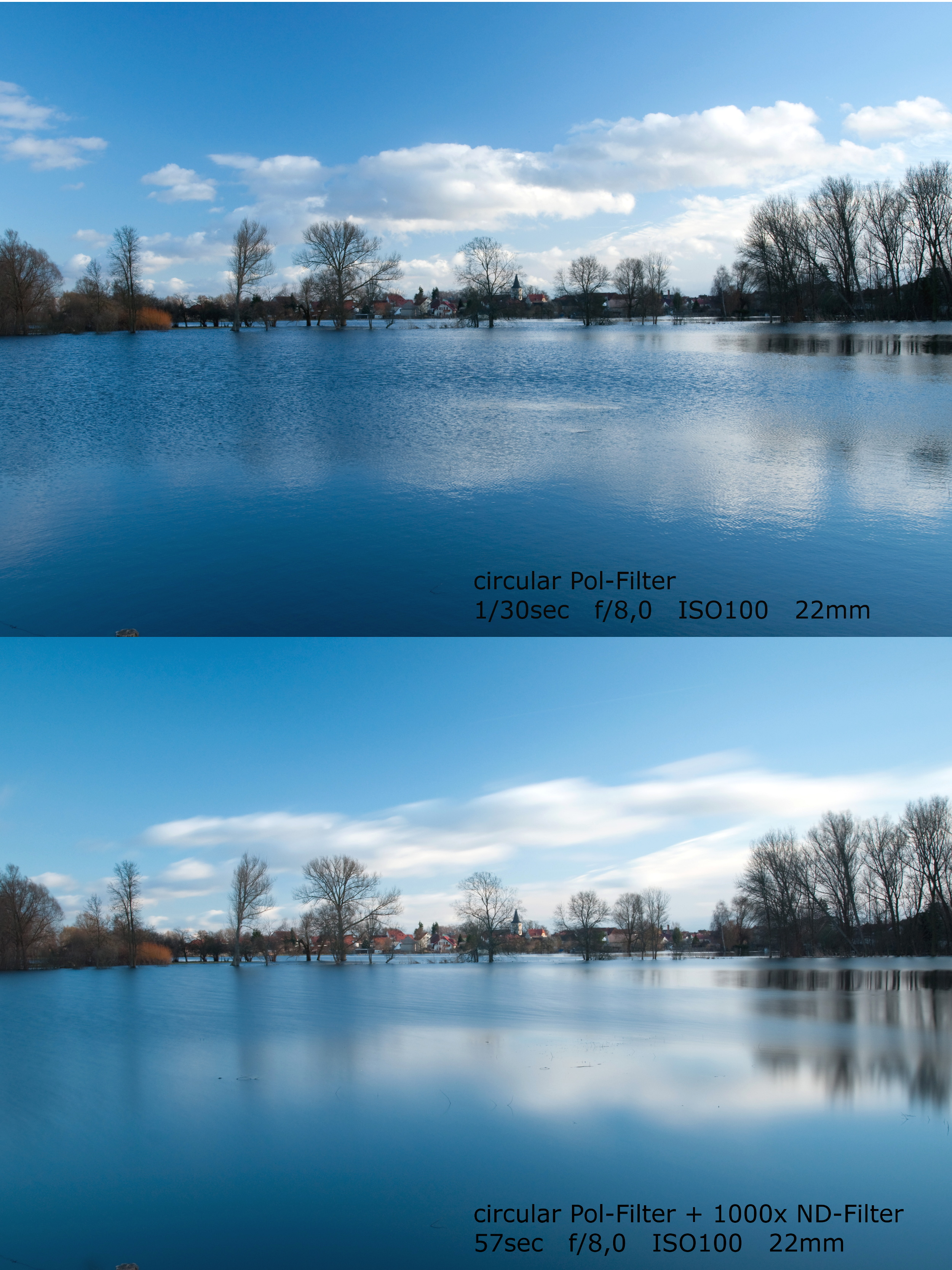
Comparison of two pictures showing the result of using an ND filter at a landscape. The first one uses only a polarizer, and the second one a polarizer and a 1000× ND filter (ND3.0), which allowed the second shot to have a much longer exposure, smoothing any motion.

The use of an ND filter allows the photographer to use a larger aperture that is at or below the diffraction limit, which varies depending on the size of the sensory medium (film or digital) and for many cameras is between f/8 and f/11, with smaller sensory medium sizes needing larger-sized apertures, and larger ones able to use smaller apertures. ND filters can also be used to reduce the depth of field of an image (by allowing the use of a larger aperture) where otherwise not possible due to a maximal shutter speed limit.

Instead of reducing the aperture to limit light, the photographer can add a ND filter to limit light, and can then set the shutter speed according to the particular motion desired (blur of water movement, for example) and the aperture set as needed (small aperture for maximal sharpness or large aperture for narrow depth of field (subject in focus and background out of focus)). Using a digital camera, the photographer can see the image right away and choose the best ND filter to use for the scene being captured by first knowing the best aperture to use for maximal sharpness desired. The shutter speed would be selected by finding the desired blur from subject movement. The camera would be set up for these in manual mode, and then the overall exposure adjusted darker by adjusting either aperture or shutter speed, noting the number of stops needed to bring the exposure to that which is desired. That offset would then be the amount of stops needed in the ND filter to use for that scene.

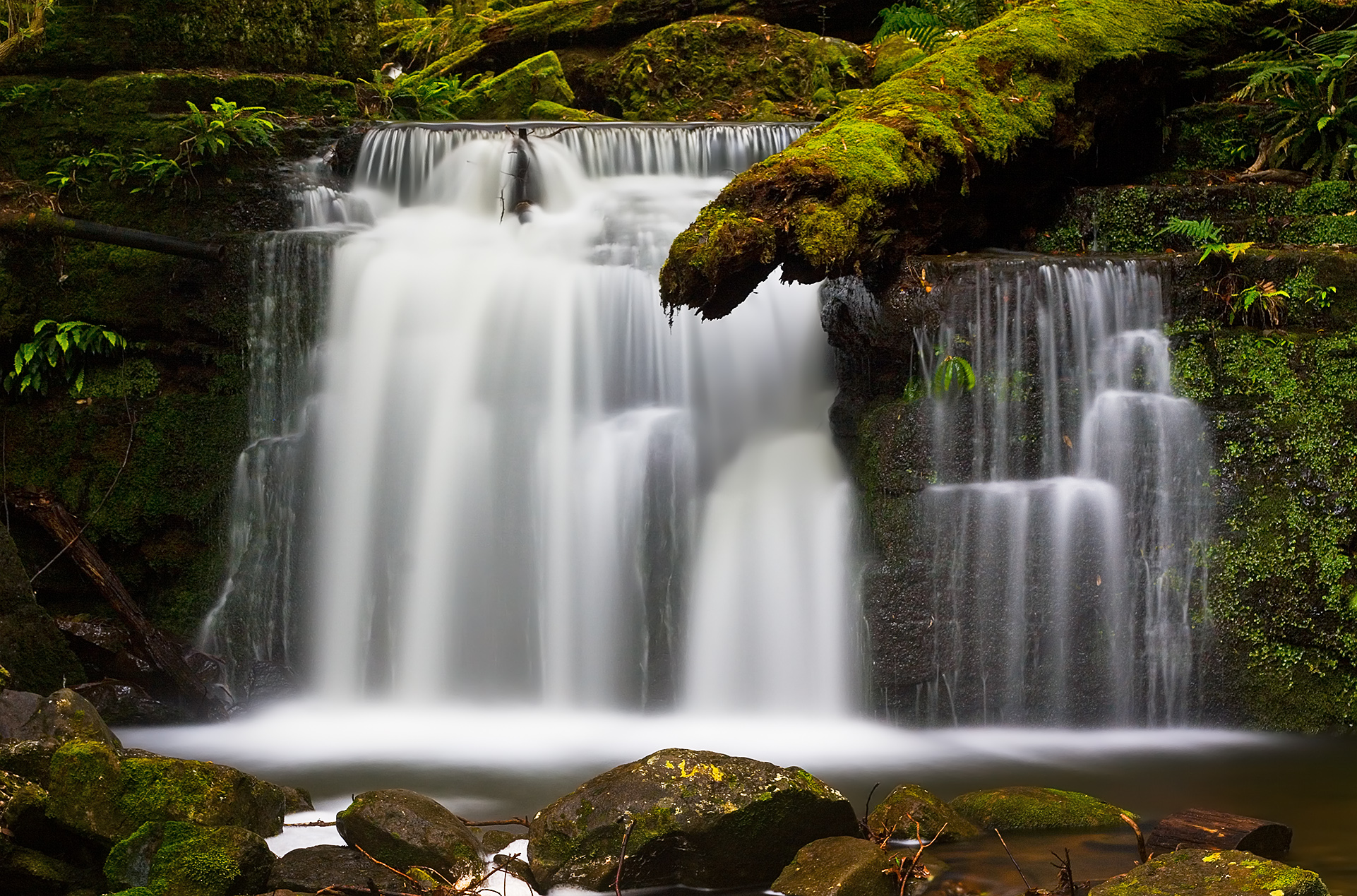
Neutral-density filters are often used to achieve motion-blur effects with slow shutter speeds.

Examples of this use include:

- Blurring water motion (e.g. waterfalls, rivers, oceans).
- Reducing depth of field in very bright light (e.g. daylight).
- When using a flash on a camera with a focal-plane shutter, exposure time is limited to the maximal speed (often 1/250th of a second, at best), at which the entire film or sensor is exposed to light at one instant. Without an ND filter, this can result in the need to use f/8 or higher.
- Using a wider aperture to stay below the diffraction limit.
- Reduce the visibility of moving objects.
- Add motion blur to subjects.
- Extended time exposures

Neutral-density filters are used to control exposure with photographic catadioptric lenses, since the use of a traditional iris diaphragm increases the ratio of the central obstruction found in those systems, leading to poor performance.

ND filters find applications in several high-precision laser experiments because the power of a laser cannot be adjusted without changing other properties of the laser light (e.g. collimation of the beam). Moreover, most lasers have a minimal power setting at which they can be operated. To achieve the desired light attenuation, one or more neutral-density filters can be placed in the path of the beam.

Large telescopes can cause the Moon and planets to become too bright and lose contrast. A neutral-density filter can increase the contrast and cut down the brightness, making these objects easier to view.

== Varieties ==
A graduated ND filter is similar, except that the intensity varies across the surface of the filter. This is useful when one region of the image is bright and the rest is not, as in a picture of a sunset.

The transition area, or edge, is available in different variations (soft, hard, attenuator). The most common is a soft edge and provides a smooth transition from the ND side and the clear side. Hard-edge filters have a sharp transition from ND to clear, and the attenuator edge changes gradually over most of the filter, so the transition is less noticeable.

Another type of ND filter configuration is the ND-filter wheel. It consists of two perforated glass disks that have progressively denser coating applied around the perforation on the face of each disk. When the two disks are counter-rotated in front of each other, they gradually and evenly go from 100% transmission to 0% transmission. These are used on catadioptric telescopes mentioned above and in any system that is required to work at 100% of its aperture (usually because the system is required to work at its maximal angular resolution).

In practice, ND filters are not perfect, as they do not reduce the intensity of all wavelengths equally. This can sometimes create color casts in recorded images, particularly with inexpensive filters. More significantly, most ND filters are only specified over the visible region of the spectrum and do not proportionally block all wavelengths of ultraviolet or infrared radiation. This can be dangerous if using ND filters to view sources (such as the Sun or white-hot metal or glass), which emit intense invisible radiation, since the eye may be damaged even though the source does not look bright when viewed through the filter. Special filters must be used if such sources are to be safely viewed.

An inexpensive, homemade alternative to professional ND filters can be made from a piece of welder's glass. Depending on the rating of the welder's glass, this can have the effect of a 10-stop filter.

=== Variable neutral-density filter ===
One main disadvantage of neutral-density filters is that different shooting situations often require a variety of filters, which can become quite expensive. For example, using screw-on filters requires a separate set for each lens diameter, though inexpensive step-up rings can minimize this requirement.

To address this issue, some manufacturers have developed variable ND filters. These filters consist of two polarizing filters, with at least one being rotatable. The rear filter blocks light in one plane, while the front filter can be adjusted. As the front filter rotates, it cuts down the amount of light reaching the camera sensor, allowing for nearly infinite control over light levels.

The advantage of this approach is reduced bulk and expenses, but one drawback is a loss of image quality caused by both using two elements together and by combining two polarizing filters.

=== Extreme ND filters ===
To create ethereal looking landscapes and seascapes with extremely blurred water or other motion, the use of multiple stacked ND filters might be required. This has, as in the case of variable NDs, the effect of reducing image quality. To counter this, some manufacturers have produced high-quality extreme ND filters. Typically these are rated at a 10-stop reduction, allowing very slow shutter speeds even in relatively bright conditions.

== Ratings ==
In photography, ND filters are quantified by their optical density or equivalently their f-stop reduction. In microscopy, the transmittance value is sometimes used. In astronomy, the fractional transmittance is sometimes used (eclipses).

Notation				Lens area opening, as fraction of the complete lens	f-stop reduction (approx.)	ANSI shade (approx.)	Fractional transmittance	
Optical density	ND.number	ND1number	NDnumber	Lens area opening, as fraction of the complete lens	f-stop reduction (approx.)	ANSI shade (approx.)	Fractional transmittance	
0.0				1	0	—	100%	1
0.3	ND 0.3	ND 101	ND2	1/2	1	1.7	50%	0.5
0.6	ND 0.6	ND 102	ND4	1/4	2	2.4	25%	0.25
0.9	ND 0.9	ND 103	ND8	1/8	3	3.11	12.5%	0.125
1.0	ND 1.0		ND10	1/10	≈ 3 1/3	3.33	10 %	0.10
1.2	ND 1.2	ND 104	ND16	1/16	4	3.81	6.25%	0.0625
1.5	ND 1.5	ND 105	ND32	1/32	5	4.51	3.125%	0.03125
1.8	ND 1.8	ND 106	ND64	1/64	6	5.21	1.563%	0.015625
2.0	ND 2.0		ND100	1/100	≈ 6 2/3	5.67	1%	0.01
2.1	ND 2.1	ND 107	ND128	1/128	7	5.92	0.781%	0.0078125
2.4	ND 2.4	ND 108	ND256	1/256	8	6.62	0.391%	0.00390625
2.6			ND400	1/400	≈ 8 2/3	7.07	0.25%	0.0025
2.7	ND 2.7	ND 109	ND512	1/512	9	7.32	0.195%	0.001953125
3.0	ND 3.0	ND 110	ND1024 (also called ND1000)	1/1024	10	8.00	0.1%	0.001
3.3	ND 3.3	ND 111	ND2048	1/2048	11	8.72	0.049%	0.00048828125
3.6	ND 3.6	ND 112	ND4096	1/4096	12	9.45	0.024%	0.000244140625
3.8	ND 3.8		ND6310	1/6310	≈ 12 2/3	9.86	0.016%	0.000158489319246
3.9	ND 3.9	ND 113	ND8192	1/8192	13	10.15	0.012%	0.0001220703125
4.0	ND 4.0		ND10000	1/10000	≈ 13 1/3	10.33	0.01%	0.0001
5.0	ND 5.0		ND100000	1/100000	≈ 16 2/3	12.67	0.001%	0.00001
5.6	ND 5.6		ND400000	1/400000	≈ 18 2/3	14.07	0.00025%	0.0000025

- Note: Hoya, B+W, Cokin use code ND2 or ND2x, etc.; Lee, Tiffen use code 0.3ND, etc.; Leica uses code 1×, 4×, 8×, etc.
- Note: ND 3.8 is the correct value for solar CCD exposure without risk of electronic damage.
- Note: Filters for direct viewing of the Sun should comply with the international standard ISO 12312-2, which limits luminous transmittance to at most 0.0032% (an optical density of about 4.5, comparable to a shade 12 welding filter) and requires the ultraviolet transmittance to be no higher than the luminous transmittance and the infrared transmittance to be no higher than 3%. The American Astronomical Society's eclipse website recommends lowering the maximum to 0.0012% (an optical density of about 4.9).
- Note: ANSI shades are defined by standard as ranges with central values. They are here approximated using the equation from ANSI Z87.1, $S = \dfrac{7}{3} log_{10}\dfrac{1}{T_{L}} + 1$, which bases luminous transmittance ($T_{L}$) on CIE Illuminant A; ANSI shade numbers have much lower limits for ultraviolet transmittance.
