= Dibenzoylmethane =

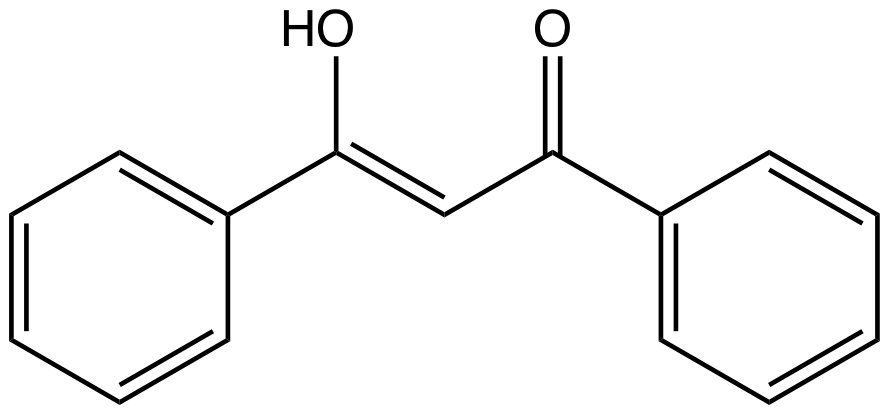

Names
- Preferred IUPAC name 1,3-Diphenylpropane-1,3-dione
- Other names 2-Benzoylacetophenone

Identifiers
CAS Number	120-46-7
3D model (JSmol)	Interactive image
ChemSpider	8126
ECHA InfoCard	100.003.999
PubChem CID	8433
UNII	ANS7ME8OKC
CompTox Dashboard (EPA)	DTXSID3041247
- InChI: InChI=1S/C15H12O2/c16-14(12-7-3-1-4-8-12)11-15(17)13-9-5-2-6-10-13/h1-10H,11H2 Key: NZZIMKJIVMHWJC-UHFFFAOYSA-N; InChI=1/C15H12O2/c16-14(12-7-3-1-4-8-12)11-15(17)13-9-5-2-6-10-13/h1-10H,11H2 Key: NZZIMKJIVMHWJC-UHFFFAOYAS
- SMILES: C1=CC=C(C=C1)C(=O)CC(=O)C2=CC=CC=C2

Properties
Chemical formula	C_{15}H_{12}O_{2}
Molar mass	224.25 g/mol
Appearance	white solid
Density	1.334 g/cm^{3}
Melting point	77 to 78 °C (171 to 172 °F; 350 to 351 K)
- Except where otherwise noted, data are given for materials in their standard state (at 25 °C [77 °F], 100 kPa). verify (what is ?) Infobox references

Dibenzoylmethane (DBM) is an organic compound with the formula (C_{6}H_{5}C(O))_{2}CH_{2}. DBM is the name for a 1,3-diketone, but the compound exists primarily as one of two equivalent enol tautomers. DBM is a white solid. Due UV-absorbing properties, derivatives of DBM such as avobenzone, have found applications as sunscreen products.

== Synthesis and reactions ==
DBM is prepared by condensation of ethyl benzoate with acetophenone.

Like other 1,3-diketones (or their enols), DBM condenses with a variety of bifunctional reagents to give heterocycles. Hydrazine gives diphenylpyrazole. Urea and thiourea also condense to give six-membered rings. With metal salts, the conjugate base of DBM forms complexes akin to the metal acetylacetonates.

== Occurrence and medicinal properties ==
Curcumin, structurally related to DBM, is the bright yellow component of the spice turmeric.

Dibenzoylmethane (DBM) is a minor constituent in the root extract of Licorice (Glycyrrhiza glabra in the family Leguminosae). It is also found in Curcumin. These occurrences have led to investigations into the medicinal properties of this class of compounds.

DBM (and trazodone) slow disease progression by preventing the cessation of protein synthesis in neurons.

== Related compounds ==
- Benzoylacetone
