= List of cosmetic ingredients =

Ingredients of cosmetic products are listed following International Nomenclature of Cosmetic Ingredients (INCI). These INCI names often differ greatly from systematic chemical nomenclature or from more common trivial names. Aluminium is spelled in the American spelling, aluminum in the INCI CosIng database.

The below tables are sorted as follows:

== A ==
INCI name	Chemical meaning - structure, name or description	purpose - role(s) in a cosmetic formulation	Regulations and safety
Acrylates/C10-C30 alkyl acrylate crosspolymer	C10-30 alkyl propenoate, polymer with propenoic acid, butenoic acidand/or alkyl propenoates, product with propenyl sucrose ether or propenyl 2,2-dihydroxymethyl-1,3-propanediol	emulsion stabilising, film forming, viscosity control	
Acrylates/vinyl isodecanoate crosspolymer	Ethenyl isodecanoate, polymer with 2-methyl-2-propenoic acid, 2-propenoic acid or one or more of their simple esters, and polyalkenylpolyether	emulsion stabilising, film forming, viscosity control	
Alcohol denat. (denatured)	Ethanol made unsuitable for drinking, often via addition of denatonium.	Solvent, astringent, defoamer, antimicrobial, fragrance, viscosity control	
Aloe barbadensis leaf juice	Aloe vera leaf juice	skin conditioning	
Aluminum starch octenylsuccinate	Starch, hydrogen octenylbutanedionate, aluminium salt	absorbent (mattifier), anticaking, viscosity control	
Allantoin	N-(2,5-dioxo-4-imidazolidinyl)urea	skin conditioning, skin protecting, soothing	
Alpha-Isomethyl Ionone	3-methyl-4-(2,6,6-trimethylcyclohex-2-enyl)but-3-en-2-one	perfuming, skin conditioning	
Aluminum chlorohydrate	Basic aluminium chloride Al_{2}(OH)_{5}Cl or Al_{2}(OH)_{x}Cl_{6−x} (0<x<6)	Antiperspirant, astringent, deodorant	
Aluminum hydroxide	Al(OH)_{3}	opacifying, emollient, skin protecting, viscosity control, moisturiser	
Aqua	Water, eau.	Solvent	
Argania spinosa: seedcake and extract; fruit extract; kernel extract/oil; sprout cell extract; leaf/leaf cell extract; extract; callus extract or culture extract; shell powder; and fruit unsaponifiables.	Argan extracts, argan oil.	Depending on type of ingredient, multiple records exist on CosIng. Functions include humectant, skin conditioning, antioxidant (callus extract), antimicrobial (callus extract), hair conditioning (callus extract), skin protecting (callus extract), emollient, abrasive (shell powder).	
Ascorbyl glucoside	C_{12}H_{18}O_{11}	antioxidant	
Ascorbyl palmitate	C_{22}H_{38}O_{7}	antioxidant, fragrance	

== B ==
INCI name	Chemical meaning - structure, name or description	purpose - role(s) in a cosmetic formulation	Regulations and safety
Behentrimonium chloride	Docosyltrimethylammonium chloride, BTAC-228	antistatic, hair conditioning, preservative	
Benzophenone-4	Sulisobenzone	light stabiliser, UV absorber, sunscreen	
Benzyl alcohol		perfuming, preservative, solvent, viscosity control	
Benzyl benzoate	Phenylmethyl Benzoate	antimicrobial, perfuming, solvent	
Benzyl Cinnamate	2-Propenoic Acid, 3-Phenyl, Phenylmethyl Ester	perfuming	
Benzyl Salicylate	2-hydroxybenzoic acid phenylmethyl ester	perfuming, light stabiliser Product type: restricted to fragrance products, rinse-off and leave-on skin and hair products (spray and non-spray), shower gel/bath products, body lotion, face make-up and make-up remover products, oral products, and deodorant products, each with a maximum concentration specified.	
Betaine		hair conditioning, humectant, skin conditioning	
Bifida ferment lysate	Break down of the product obtained by the fermentation of Bifidobacterium.	skin conditioning	
Bis-aminopropyl/ethoxy aminopropyl dimethicone		hair conditioning	
Butylated Hydroxyanisole (BHA)		antioxidant, fragrance	
Butylene glycol	1,3-Butanediol	solvent, moisturiser	
Boron nitride	BN, hexagonal form	bulking, slip modifier	
Butane	butane C_{4}H_{10}	propellant	
Butyrospermum parkii butter	shea butter, fat obtained from the fruit of the Shea Tree, Butyrospernum parkii, Sapotaceae	skin conditioning, viscosity control	

== C ==
INCI name	Chemical meaning - structure, name or description	purpose - role(s) in a cosmetic formulation	Regulations and safety
C12-15 alkyl benzoate	C_{6}H_{5}COO(CH_{2})_{11-14}CH_{3.} Benzoic acid, C12-15 alkyl esters	antimicrobial, skin conditioning, emollient	
Calcium sodium borosilicate	Borosilicate glass. Consisting essentially of calcium and sodium borosilicates	bulking	
Caprylyl glycol	1,2-Octanediol	deodorant, skin conditioning, emollient, hair conditioning	
Caramel	Concentrated solution obtained from heating sucrose or glucose solutions. Used as a brown colour	colourant, fragrance	
Cera alba	Beeswax. Consists of myricyl palmitate, cerotic acid and esters and some high-carbon paraffins	emollient, viscosity control, emulsifier, perfuming	
Cetearyl alcohol	Cetostearyl alcohol	emollient, viscosity control, emulsifier, emulsion stabilising, foam boosting, opacifying, wetting agent	
Cetrimonium chloride	Cetyltrimethylammonium chloride (CTAC)	antimicrobial, antistatic, emulsifying, preservative	
Cetyl alcohol	CH_{3}(CH_{2})_{15}OH. Hexadecan-1-ol, palmityl alcohol.	emollient, viscosity control, emulsifier, emulsion stabilising, foam boosting, fragrance, opacifying, wetting agent	
Chlorphenesin	3-(p-Chlorophenoxy)- propane-1,2 diol	antimicrobial, preservative	
CI 19140 (Acid yellow 23): Aluminum lake	Yellow pyrazole colour	colourant, hair dyeing	To be used in non-oxidative hair dyes only.
CI 42090 (Acid blue 9); Aluminum lake, ammonium lake, ammonium salt	Blue triphenylmethane colour	colourant, hair dyeing	To be used in non-oxidative hair dyes only.
CI 60730 (Acid violet 43)	Violet anthraquinone colour	colourant, hair dyeing	To be used in non-oxidative hair dyes only.. Not to be used on mucous membranes.
Citronellol		perfuming	
Citric acid	C_{6}H_{8}O_{7}	buffering, exfoliant	
Citrus aurantium amara peel oil or flower oil	Bitter orange, sour orange, Seville orange, bigarade orange, marmalade orange.	perfuming, skin conditioning	
Cocamide DEA	Cocamide diethanolamine. CH_{3}(CH_{2})_{n}C(=O)N(CH_{2}CH_{2}OH)_{2}, where n is from 8 to 18. Amides, coco, N,N-bis(hydroxyethyl). Fatty acid dialkylamides and dialkanolamides	emulsifier, emulsion stabilising, foam boosting, wetting agent, viscosity control	To be kept in nitrite-free containers
Cocamidopropyl Betaine		antistatic, foam boosting, hair conditioning, wetting agent, skin conditioning, viscosity control	
Coco-glucoside	Obtained by the condensation of coconut alcohol with glucose	wetting agent, surfactant, foaming	
Coconut acid	Coco fatty acids	wetting agent, emulsifier, emollient, surfactant	
cyclohexasiloxane	Dodecamethylcyclohexasiloxane (D6)	solvent	
cyclopentasiloxane	Decamethylcyclopentasiloxane (D5)	solvent, emollient, skin conditioning, hair conditioning	Should not be used in hair styling aerosols and sun care spray products as it may be toxic when aerosoled.

== D ==
INCI name	Chemical meaning - structure, name or description	purpose - role(s) in a cosmetic formulation	Regulations and safety
Decyl glucoside	Obtained from the condensation of decyl alcohol with glucose	wetting agent, surfactant, emulsion stabilising	
Diglycerin		humectant, skin conditioning	
Dimethicone/Vinyl dimethicone crosspolymer	Crosslinked dimethyl siloxane polymer (silicone elastomer) that is formed by the reaction between Hydrogen Dimethicone or Bis-Hydrogen Dimethicone, and Vinyl Dimethicone or Bis-Vinyldimethicone.	viscosity control, skin conditioning	
Dimethyl phenethyl acetate		fragrance	
Disodium distyrylbiphenyl disulfonate		hair conditioning, wetting agent, UV absorber, viscosity control	
Disodium EDTA	C_{10}H_{14}N_{2}Na_{2}O_{8}	chelating, viscosity control	
DMDM hydantoin	Releases formaldehyde	preservative	

== E ==
INCI name	Chemical meaning - structure, name or description	purpose - role(s) in a cosmetic formulation	Regulations and safety
Egg oil	triglycerides extracted from egg yolk; contains polyunsaturated fatty acids (docosahexaenoic acid and arachidonic acid), cholesterol and traces of lecithin	hair conditioning, skin conditioning	
Ethylhexylglycerin	Octoxyglycerin	skin conditioning, deodorant	
Ethyl macadamiate	Fatty Acid, Macadamia Nut Oil, Ethyl Esters	skin conditioning	

== G ==
INCI name	Chemical meaning - structure, name or description	purpose - role(s) in a cosmetic formulation	Regulations and safety
Galactomyces ferment filtrate	Yeast-derived ingredient.	moisturiser	
Glutamic acid	Glutamate, C_{5}H_{9}NO_{4}.	antistatic, hair conditioning, moisturiser	
Glycerin	Glycerol	solvent, viscosity control, skin conditioning, moisturiser	
Glyceryl stearate	Glyceryl monostearate (GMS). Stearic acid, monoester with glycerol	emollient, emulsifying	
Glyceryl stearate SE		emulsifying	

== H ==
INCI name	Chemical meaning - structure, name or description	purpose - role(s) in a cosmetic formulation	Regulations and safety
1,2-hexanediol		skin conditioning, solvent	
Hexamethylindanopyran		fragrance, perfuming	
Hexyl cinnamal	α-Hexylcinnamaldehyde, 2-Benzylideneoctanal.	perfuming	
Hexylene glycol	2-Methyl-2,4-pentanediol (MPD)	emulsifying, skin conditioning, solvent, wetting agent, perfuming	
Histidine	Amino acid	antistatic, moisturiser, skin conditioning	
Hydrogenated palm glycerides citrate	Glycerides, palm-oil mono-, di-, and tri- hydrogenated, citrates	emollient, skin conditioning	
Hydrolyzed soy protein PG-propyl methylsilanediol	Protein hydrolyzates, soybean, reaction product with 1,2-propanediol, dihydroxymethylpropylsilyl ether	hair conditioning, skin conditioning	
Hydroxyethylcellulose	cellulose fiber from wood pulp with –OCH_{2}CH_{2}OH groups added	binding, emulsion stabilising, film forming, light stabiliser, viscosity control	
Hydroxypropylcellulose	cellulose fibre from wood pulp with –OCH_{2}CH(OH)CH_{3} groups added	binding, emulsifier, emulsion stabilising, film forming, viscosity control	
Hydroxypropyl methylcellulose	Hypromellose, HPMC	antistatic, binding, emulsion stabilising, film forming, wetting agent, viscosity control	

== I ==
INCI name	Chemical meaning - structure, name or description	purpose - role(s) in a cosmetic formulation	Regulations and safety
Isobutane	2-methylpropane, methylpropane. (CH_{3})_{2}CHCH_{3}	propellant	
Isoceteth-10	Alcohols, C16-branched, ethoxylated	emulsifier, wetting agent	
Isododecane		emollient, perfuming, solvent	
Isopentane	2-methylbutane, methylbutane. (CH_{3})_{2}CHCH_{2}CH_{3}	propellant, solvent, viscosity control	
Isopropyl alcohol	Propan-2-ol, isopropanol, IPA	antifoaming, solvent, viscosity control, perfuming	
Isopropyl palmitate		binding, emollient, perfuming, fragrance	
Isostearyl neopentanoate		binding, emollient, skin conditioning	

== L ==
INCI name	Chemical meaning - structure, name or description	purpose - role(s) in a cosmetic formulation	Regulations and safety
Lanolin	Wool fat, wool wax. Derived from sebaceous secretions of sheep	emollient, emulsifier, surfactant	
Laurdimonium hydroxypropyl hydrolyzed keratin	Keratin hydrolysates, 2-hydroxy-3-(N-dodecyl-N,N-dimethylammonio)propyl derivatives, chlorides	antistatic, hair conditioning, skin conditioning	
Lauryl alcohol	Dodecanol. C_{12}H_{26}O	emollient, emulsifier, emulsion stabilising, viscosity control	
Lauryl glucoside		surfactant, wetting agent	
Lavandula angustifolia Lavandula hybrida Lavandula intermedia	Lavender plants oil/extract. Each extract and species have their own CosIng entrance (flower, whole plant, leaf etc).	fragrance, deodorant, various minor functions	
Limonene		deodorant, solvent, perfuming	
Linalool		fragrance, deodorant	
Linalyl acetate	3,7-Dimethyl octa-1,6-diene-3-yl acetate	fragrance	

== M ==
INCI name	Chemical meaning - structure, name or description	purpose - role(s) in a cosmetic formulation	Regulations and safety
Macadamia ternifolia: seed oil, seedcake or shell powder.	Macadamia nut, bushnut. Primarily glycerides of the fatty acids	Depending on type of ingredient, multiple records exist on CosIng. Functions include emollient, skin conditioning, exfoliating (seedcake) and abrasive (shell powder).	
Magnesium chloride	MgCl_{2}	viscosity control, flavouring	
Magnesium nitrate		hair conditioning	
Magnesium sulfate	MgSO_{4}	bulking	
Maltodextrin		absorbent (mattifier), binding, emulsion stabilising, film forming, hair conditioning, skin conditioning	
Melaleuca alternifolia: leaf; extract; leaf extract, oil, powder or water; vesicles; flower/leaf/stem extract or oil.	Tea tree.	Depending on type of ingredient, multiple records exist on CosIng. Functions include abrasive, emollient, skin conditioning, antioxidant, fragrance, skin protecting, perfuming	Tea tree oil is considered a skin sensitiser by the Scientific Committee on Consumer Products (EU).
Menthyl lactate		fragrance, refreshing	
Methylchloroisothiazolinone	MCl, 5-Chloro-2-methyl-1,2-thiazol-3-one.	preservative	
Methylisothiazolinone	MIT, 2-Methyl-1,2-thiazol-3-one	preservative	
Mica	Series of silicate minerals of varying chemical composition but with similar physical properties. Mica may have well-defined cleavage and split into very thin sheets.	Anticaking, bulking, colorant, opacifying	
Microcrystalline wax	Cera microcristallina. Wax derived from petrolatum, fine crystals.	viscosity control, emulsion stabilising	

== N ==
INCI name	Chemical meaning - structure, name or description	purpose - role(s) in a cosmetic formulation	Regulations and safety
Niacinamide	Vitamin B3, nicotinamide.	Smoothing	
Nylon-12	(C_{12}H_{23}NO)_{n}	bulking, opacifying, viscosity control	

== O ==
INCI name	Chemical meaning - structure, name or description	purpose - role(s) in a cosmetic formulation	Regulations and safety
Oleic acid		emollient, emulsifier	

== P ==
INCI name	Chemical meaning - structure, name or description	purpose - role(s) in a cosmetic formulation	Regulations and safety
Palmitic acid	CH_{3}(CH_{2})_{14}COOH	emollient, emulsifier	
Panthenol	Pantothenol. Provitamin of B5	antistatic, hair conditioning, skin conditioning	
Paraffinum liquidum	White mineral oil, petroleum. Mixture of hydrocarbons.	antistatic, emollient, skin protecting, solvent	
Parfum	Fragrance. Generic term used to indicate that a fragrance is present, and covers a wide range of ingredients		Required by EU law to specify the exact ingredient, when over the specified concentration.
PEG-7 glyceryl cocoate	Poly(oxy-1,2-ethanediyl), .alpha.,.alpha.',.alpha.''-1,2,3-propanetriyltris-.omega.-hydroxy-, monococonut acid ester.	emulsifying, wetting agent	
PEG-20	Polyethylene glycol-20. Poly(oxy-1,2-ethanediyl), .alpha.-hydro-.omega.-hydroxy-.	moisturiser, solvent	
PEG-40 hydrogenated castor oil		emulsifier, surfactant	
PEG-80 sorbitan laurate	Sorbitan, monododecanoate, poly(oxy-1,2-ethanediyl) derivatives	wetting agent	
PEG-150 pentaerythrityl tetrastearate	2,2-Bis(hydroxymethyl)-1,3-propanediol, ethoxylated, tetraoctadecanoates	emulsifier	
Pentylene glycol	1,5-Pentanediol	solvent, skin conditioning	
Petrolatum including oxidised, alumina-treated, hydrotreated, carbon treated, silicic acid-treated and clay-treated	Petroleum. C_{15}H_{15}N	antistatic, emollient	Prohibited except if the full refining history is known and it can be shown that the substance from which it is produced is not a carcinogen.
Phenoxyethanol	2-Phenoxyethanol	antimicrobial, preservative	
Polymethyl methacrylate (PMMA)	(C_{5}O_{2}H_{8})_{n}	film forming	
Polysorbate 20	Sorbitan, monododecanoate, poly(oxy-1,2-ethanediyl) derivatives	emulsifying, wetting agent	
Polyquaternium-37 Polyquaternium-39	1. Poly(2-methacryloxyethyltrimethylammonium chloride); 2. Terpolymer of acrylic acid, acrylamide and diallyldimethylammonium Chloride	antistatic, film forming	
Potassium sorbate		fragrance, preservative	
Propane	propane CH_{3}CH_{2}CH_{3}	propellant (pressurized dispenser)	
Propylene glycol	Propane-1,2-diol	moisturiser, solvent	
PPG-2 hydroxyethyl cocamide	Fatty acids, coconut, reaction products with ethanolamine, propoxylated	emulsifying, wetting agent	
Pyrus malus: pomace extract; seed powder, oil or extract; peel powder, extract or wax (cera); fruit or fruit water; pectin extract; ferment filtrate; bark extract, leaf extract; stem extract; pulp extract; flower extract or water; juice; carpel powder; fiber; root bark powder; and callus powder.	Apple extracts in various forms. Malus domestica, Malus pumila, Pyrus malus L., Rosaceae.	Depending on type of ingredient, multiple records exist on CosIng. Functions include antioxidant, skin conditioning, exfoliating (some powders and ferment), astringent (fruit and bark), emollient (seed oil and flower water) binding (fiber), emulsion stabilisng (fiber), viscosity control (fiber), fragrance (fruit water), bleaching (root bark)	

== S ==
INCI name	Chemical meaning - structure, name or description	purpose - role(s) in a cosmetic formulation	Regulations and safety
Saccharomyces/Rice Bran ferment		moisturiser	
Salicylic acid	2-hydroxy benzoic acid	anti-seborrheic, hair conditioning, keratolytic (removing dead skin cells), fragrance, preservative, skin conditioning	Not to be used in oral products (except lipstick) or products that may be inhaled. It is category 2 reprotoxic, meaning it is suspected to be harmful to reproduction with limited evidence.
Silica	SiO_{2}, silicon dioxide	abrasive, absorbent (mattifier), anticaking, bulking, opacifying, viscosity control	
Sodium benzoate	C_{6}H_{5}COONa	Anticorrosive, preservative, fragrance. Product type: rinse-off products, oral products, leave-on products	
Sodium chloride	NaCl, salt	bulking, fragrance, oral care, viscosity control	
Sodium citrate	Trisodium citrate	buffering, chelating, fragrance	
Sodium coco-sulfate	Sodium dodecyl sulfate (SDS), sodium lauryl sulfate (SLS, not to be confused with sodium laureth sulfate).	wetting agent	
Sodium methyl cocoyl taurate	Sodium salt of the coconut fatty acid amide of N-methyltaurine	wetting agent	
Sodium hyaluronate	Sodium form of hyaluronic acid	humectant, skin conditioning	
Sodium hydroxide	NaOH, caustic soda, lye	buffering, denaturant Product type: restricted to nail cuticle solvents, hair straighteners, and as a pH adjuster	Contact with eyes must be avoided as can cause blindness.
Sodium laureth sulfate	Sodium lauryl ether sulfate, SLES. Sodium salt of sulfated ethoxylated lauryl alcohol	wetting agent, surfactant, foaming, emulsifying	
Sodium salicylate	Sodium salt of salicylic acid	denaturant, preservative	
Sodium sulfate	Na_{2}SO_{4}	bulking, viscosity control	
Sodium xylenesulfonate		hydrotrope	
Sorbitan sesquioleate		emulsifier	
Stearamidopropyl dimethylamine		antistatic, emulsifiying, hair conditioning, cleansing	
Stearyl alcohol	1-octadecanol	emollient, emulsifiying, emulsion stabilising, foam boosting, fragrance, opacifying, wetting agent, refatting, viscosity control	
Synthetic fluorphlogopite		bulking, viscosity control	
Synthetic petrolatum	Paraffin wax indistinguishable from petrolatum.	skin conditioning, viscosity control	

== T ==
INCI name	Chemical meaning - structure, name or description	purpose - role(s) in a cosmetic formulation	Regulations and safety
Talc	Mg_{3}Si_{4}O_{10}(OH)_{2.} Powdered native, hydrous magnesium silicate sometimes containing a small portion of aluminum silicate	abrasive, absorbent (mattifier), anticaking, bulking, opacifying, skin protecting, slip modifier	
Tetramethyl acetyloctahydronaphthalenes	OTNE (octahydrotetramethyl acetophenone). Synthetic ketone fragrance	fragrance, perfuming, skin conditioning	
Tetrasodium EDTA		chelating	
Trideceth-9	Poly(oxy-1,2-ethanediyl), .alpha.-tridecyl-.omega.-hydroxy; Isotridecanol, ethoxylated	emulsifying, wetting agent	
Triethanolamine	TEOA. N(CH_{2}CH_{2}OH)_{3.} Trialkylamines, trialkanolamines and their salts	emulsifying, wetting agent, buffering, fragrance	To be kept in nitrite-free containers.
Titanium dioxide	TiO_{2}	sunscreen, colourant (white)	Not permitted to be used if it could be inhaled (EU).
Tin oxide	SnO	abrasive, bulking, opacifying, viscosity control	
Tocopherol	Tocopherol consists of alpha-tocopherol, beta-tocopherol, delta-tocopherol and/or gamma-tocopherol. Types of vitamin E	antioxidant, fragrance, skin conditioning, occlusive (reduces evaporation from skin)	

== X ==
INCI name	Chemical meaning - structure, name or description	purpose - role(s) in a cosmetic formulation	Regulations and safety
Xanthan gum		emulsifier, viscosity control, surfactant	

== Z ==
INCI name	Chemical meaning - structure, name or description	purpose - role(s) in a cosmetic formulation	Regulations and safety
Zinc Oxide	CI 77947	Sunscreen, bulking, cosmetic colorant (white), skin protecting, UV absorber, UV filter	Not permitted to be used if it could be inhaled (EU).
