= Epilogic =

American skincare company

epi.logic
- Industry: Consumer goods
- Founder: Dr. Chaneve Jeanniton
- Headquarters: Brooklyn, NY, United States
- Products: Skin care; Personal care
- Website: epilogicskincare.com

Epi.logic is an American skincare company headquartered in Brooklyn, NY. Founded by oculofacial plastic surgeon Dr. Chaneve Jeanniton, epi.logic develops products designed particularly for black and brown skin. Epi.logic products are designed to address issues like sensitive skin, over-drying, and hyperpigmentation. Hyperpigmentation is of particular concern to people with melanin overproduction, and many methods to treat it have been found to be unsafe. Epi.logic develops formulas that eliminate unnecessary additives present in other skin care products that can cause unwanted reactions.

== See also ==
- Federal Food, Drug, and Cosmetic Act § Cosmetics
- International Nomenclature of Cosmetic Ingredients (INCI)
- Food additive
- List of cosmetic ingredients
- Testing cosmetics on animals
