= Wetting (disambiguation) =

Wetting is the ability of a liquid to maintain contact with a solid surface.

Wetting may also refer to:

- Bedwetting, urination while asleep
- Pore wetting or liquid entry pressure

== See also ==
- Wetting solution
