= LEP (disambiguation) =

LEP is the Large Electron–Positron Collider, a particle accelerator.

LEP or Lep may also refer to:

== Science ==
- Laser Excited Phosphor, great beam distance light powered by a laser
- Light emitting plasma, or plasma lamps
- Light emitting polymer
- Lep, an abbreviation for Lepus (constellation)
- LEP, an alias for leptin, a gene
- Laser evoked potentials, in neuralgia
- The liquid entry pressure (LEP) of a hydrophobic membrane

== Organisations ==
- Liberal Egyptian Party
- Local ecumenical partnership or local ecumenical project
- Local enterprise partnership, a type of partnership between government and the business community for economic development in England

== Other uses ==
- Lower Elements Police, a police squad in the Artemis Fowl children's novels
- Limited English proficiency, in English language learning and teaching
- Lancashire Evening Post, an English newspaper
- Long-exposure photography
- Lycée professionnel, French vocational high schools formerly called Lycée d'enseignement professionnel

== See also ==
- Leps (disambiguation)
- Lepidoptera, an order of insects that includes moths and butterflies
