= Cetone =

Cetone may refer to:

- α-Cetone, or α-isomethyl ionone
- Cétone, the French word for ketone

== See also ==
- Acetone
- Urethane
