= Nigrosene =

Nigrosene is an outdated trade name for a black dye made from oxidised aniline dispersed in water. It was used as a colourant in shoe polish until the 1940s, and as a dark stain for bedplates, brackets, crank handles, and wood. This name is no longer used in today's trading market.
