= Kopexil =

Names
- IUPAC names 2,3-Dihydro-3-hydroxy-2-imino-4-pyrimidinamine; 2,4-Diaminopyrimidine 3-N-oxide
- Other names Aminexil

Identifiers
CAS Number	113275-13-1; 74638-76-9 (pyridine oxide tautomer)
3D model (JSmol)	Interactive image
ChemSpider	10445922
EC Number	616-121-2
PubChem CID	10197687
UNII	1756681479
CompTox Dashboard (EPA)	DTXSID40996155
- InChI: InChI=1S/C4H6N4O/c5-3-1-2-7-4(6)8(3)9/h1-2H,5H2,(H2,6,7) Key: SGHQFNHCCOBUKB-UHFFFAOYSA-N; InChI=1S/C4H6N4O/c5-3-1-2-7-4(6)8(3)9/h1-2,6,9H,5H2 Key: YTKGAYFHUZTLCI-UHFFFAOYSA-N
- SMILES: c1cnc([n+](c1N)[O-])N

Properties
Chemical formula	C_{4}H_{6}N_{4}O
Molar mass	126.119 g·mol^{−1}
Appearance	white odorless crystals
Melting point	210 to 218 °C (410 to 424 °F; 483 to 491 K)
Solubility in water	slightly soluble

Hazards
- GHS labelling
Pictograms	(GHS07: Exclamation mark)
Signal word	Warning
Hazard statements	H302
Precautionary statements	P264, P270, P301+P312, P330, P501
- Except where otherwise noted, data are given for materials in their standard state (at 25 °C [77 °F], 100 kPa). verify (what is ?) Infobox references

Kopexil (INCI name diaminopyrimidine oxide, trade name Aminexil) is a chemical compound similar to minoxidil. Minoxidil was originally used to treat high blood pressure; a side effect was increased body hair. Both compounds have been used for therapy of alopecia. Kopexil is not approved for use as a drug in the United States or in Europe.

== Chemical structure ==
Kopexil is an N-oxide, a group of substances in which the nitrogen atom of a tertiary amine is oxidized. The compound can exist in two tautomeric forms.

== Mechanism of action ==
The exact mechanism of action of kopexil is unknown. There is some evidence of therapeutic effect for kopexil against alopecia.
