= Isoceteth-20 =

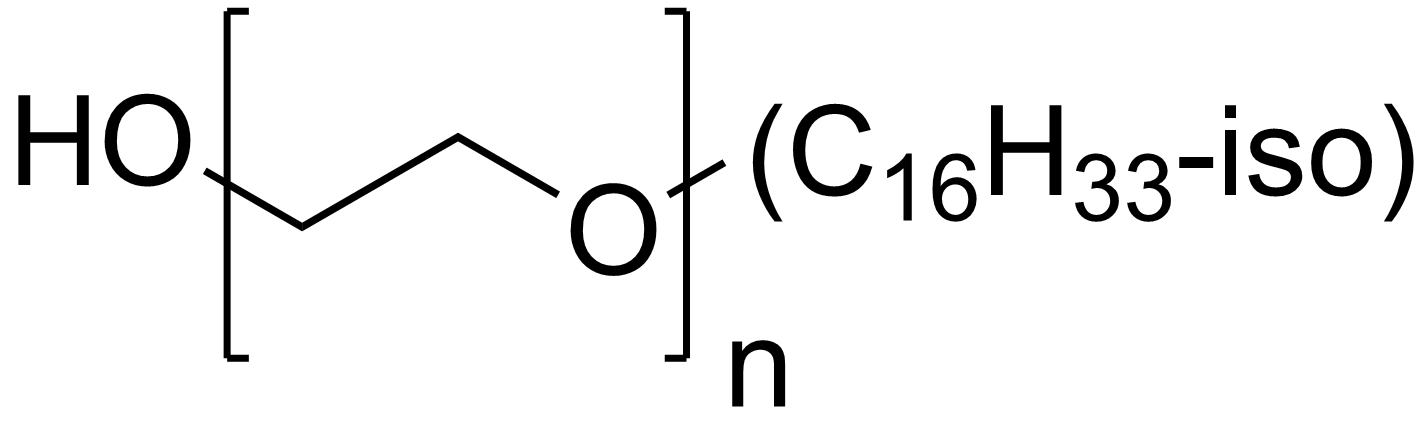

Names
- Other names Polyethylene glycol monoisohexadecyl ether; Polyethylene glycol isocetyl ether

Identifiers
CAS Number	69364-63-2
3D model (JSmol)	Interactive image; n=1: Interactive image
ChemSpider	none
ECHA InfoCard	100.166.838
EC Number	218-373-5
PubChem CID	n=1: 16492
UNII	O020065R7Z
CompTox Dashboard (EPA)	DTXSID60858847, DTXSID80891670 DTXSID00858846, DTXSID60858847, DTXSID80891670
- InChI: n=1: InChI=1S/C18H38O2/c1-2-3-4-5-6-7-8-9-10-11-12-13-14-15-17-20-18-16-19/h19H,2-18H2,1H3 Key: FSAMVJAGJWGWTQ-UHFFFAOYSA-N
- SMILES: CCCCCCCCCCCCCCCCOCCOCCOCCOCCOCCOCCOCCOCCOCCOCCOCCOCCOCCOCCOCCOCCOCCOCCOCCOCCO; n=1: CCCCCCCCCCCCCCCCOCCO

Properties
Chemical formula	HO(C_{2}H_{4}O)_{n}C_{16}H_{33}; n ≈ 20
Molar mass	variable
Appearance	White waxy solid
Density	1.0
Solubility	Soluble in water, propylene glycol, ethanol
- Surface tension
HLB	15.7
- Except where otherwise noted, data are given for materials in their standard state (at 25 °C [77 °F], 100 kPa). verify (what is ?) Infobox references

Isoceteth-20 is a polyethylene glycol ether formed by the ethoxylation of isocetyl alcohol (branched C_{16} fatty alcohols); with the general formula HO(C_{2}H_{4}O)_{n}C_{16}H_{33} where n has an average value of 20. It is a nonionic surfactant used as an oil-in-water emulsifier (e.g. perfume solubilizer), skin cleanser, and foam stabilizer in personal care products.

== See also ==
- Polyethylene glycol cetyl ether - a similar material made from cetyl alcohol
