= Membrane distillation =

Thermally driven separation process

Membrane distillation (MD) is a thermally driven separation process in which separation is driven by phase change. A hydrophobic membrane presents a barrier for the liquid phase, allowing the vapour phase (e.g. water vapour) to pass through the membrane's pores. The driving force of the process is a partial vapour pressure difference commonly triggered by a temperature difference.

== Principle of membrane distillation ==
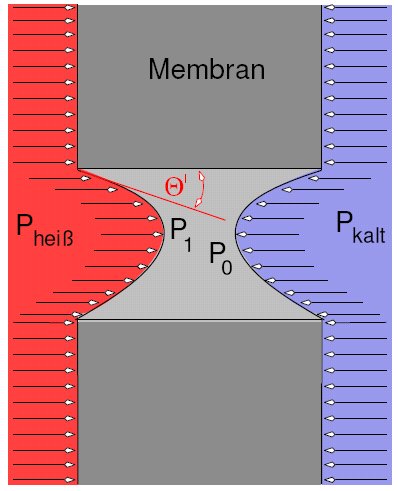
Capillary depression of water on a hydophobic membrane

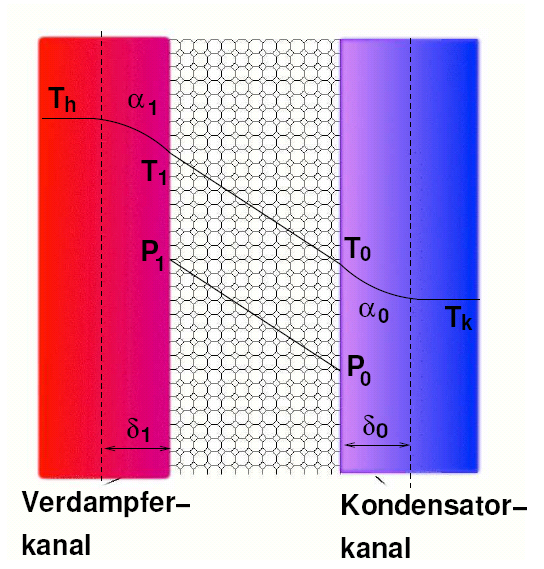
Temperature and pressure profile through the membrane considering temperature polarisation

Most processes that use a membrane to separate materials rely on static pressure difference as the driving force between the two bounding surfaces (e.g. reverse osmosis - RO), or a difference in concentration (dialysis), or an electric field (ED). The selectivity of a membrane can be due to the relation of the pore size to the size of the substance being retained, or its diffusion coefficient, or its electrical polarity. Membranes used for membrane distillation (MD) inhibit passage of liquid water while allowing permeability for free water molecules and thus, for water vapour. These membranes are made of hydrophobic synthetic material (e.g. PTFE, PVDF or PP) and offer pores with a standard diameter between 0.1 and 0.5 μm (3.9×10^{−6} and 1.97×10^{−5} in). As water has strong dipole characteristics, whilst the membrane fabric is non-polar, the membrane material is not wetted by the liquid. Even though the pores are considerably larger than the molecules, the high water surface tension prevents the liquid phase from entering the pores. A convex meniscus develops into the pore. This effect is named capillary action. Amongst other factors, the depth of impression can depend on the external pressure load on the liquid. A dimension for the infiltration of the pores by the liquid is the contact angle Θ=90 – Θ'. As long as Θ < 90° and accordingly Θ' > 0° no wetting of the pores will take place. If the external pressure rises above the so-called liquid entry pressure, then Θ = 90°resulting in a bypass of the pore. The driving force which delivers the vapour through the membrane, in order to collect it on the permeate side as product water, is the partial water vapour pressure difference between the two bounding surfaces. This partial pressure difference is the result of a temperature difference between the two bounding surfaces. As can be seen in the image, the membrane is charged with a hot feed flow on one side and a cooled permeate flow on the other side. The temperature difference through the membrane, usually between 5 and 20 K, conveys a partial pressure difference which ensures that the vapour developing at the membrane surface follows the pressure drop, permeating through the pores and condensing on the cooler side.

=== Membrane distillation techniques ===
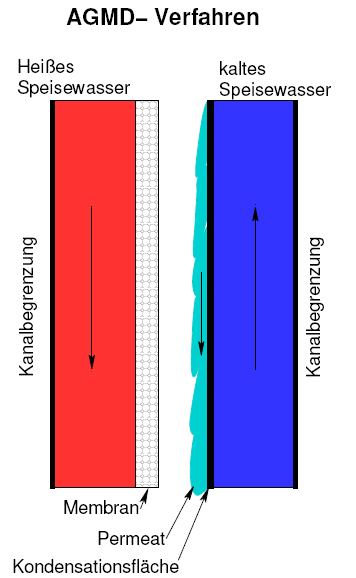
Schematic AGMD arrangement

Many different membrane distillation techniques exist. The basic four techniques mainly differ by the arrangement of their distillate channel or the manner in which this channel is operated. The following technologies are most common:

- Direct Contact MD (DCMD)
- Air Gap MD (AGMD)
- Vacuum MD (VMD)
- Sweeping Gas MD (SWGMD)
- Vacuum multi-effect membrane distillation (V-MEMD)
- Permeate Gap MD (PGMD)

=== Direct-contact MD ===
In DCMD, both sides of the membrane are charged with liquid- hot feed water on the evaporator side and cooled permeate on the permeate side. The condensation of the vapour passing through the membrane happens directly inside the liquid phase at the membrane boundary surface. Since the membrane is the only barrier blocking the mass transport, relatively high surface related permeate flows can be achieved with DCMD. A disadvantage is the high sensible heat loss, as the insulating properties of the single membrane layer are low. However, a high heat loss between evaporator and condenser is also the result of the single membrane layer. This lost heat is not available to the distillation process, thus lowering the efficiency. Unlike other configurations of membrane distillation, in DCMD the cooling across the membrane is provided by permeate flow rather than feed preheating. Therefore, an external heat exchanger is also needed to recover heat from the permeate, and the high flow rate of the feed must be carefully optimized.

=== Air-gap MD ===
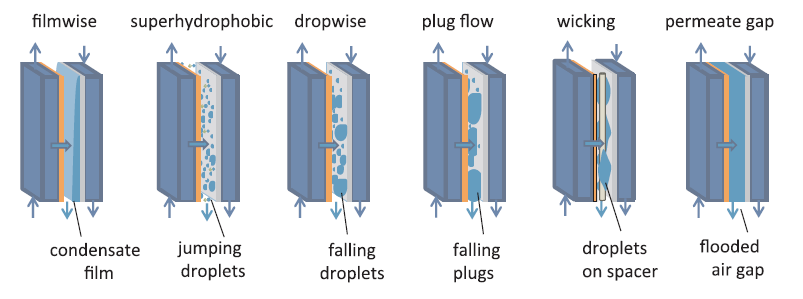
Droplet condensation regimes seen in AGMD.

In air-gap MD, the evaporator channel resembles that in DCMD, whereas the permeate gap lies between the membrane and a cooled walling and is filled with air. The vapour passing through the membrane must additionally overcome this air gap before condensing on the cooler surface. The advantage of this method is the high thermal insulation towards the condenser channel, thus minimizing heat conduction losses. However, the disadvantage is that the air gap represents an additional barrier for mass transport, reducing the surface- related permeate output compared to DCMD. A further advantage over DCMD is that volatile substances with a low surface tension such as alcohol or other solvents can be separated from diluted solutions, due to the fact that there is no contact between the liquid permeate and the membrane with AGMD. AGMD is especially advantageous compared to alternatives at higher salinity. Variations on AGMD can include hydrophobic condensing surfaces or porous condensers for improved flux and energy efficiency. In AGMD, uniquely important design features include gap thickness, condensing surface hydrophobicity, gap spacer design, and tilt angle.

=== Sweeping-gas MD ===
Sweeping-gas MD, also known as air stripping, uses a channel configuration with an empty gap on the permeate side. This configuration is the same as in AGMD. Condensation of the vapour takes place outside the MD module in an external condenser. As with AGMD, volatile substances with a low surface tension can be distilled with this process. The advantage of SWGMD over AGMD is the significant reduction of the barrier to the mass transport through forced flow. Hereby higher surface-related productwater mass flows can be achieved than with AGMD. A disadvantage of SWGMD caused by the gas component and therefore the higher total mass flow, is the necessity of a higher condenser capacity. When using smaller gas mass flows there is a risk of the gas heating itself at the hot membrane surface, thus reducing the vapour pressure difference and therefore the driving force. One solution of this problem for SWGMD and for AGMD is the use of a cooled walling for the permeate channel, and maintaining temperature by flushing it with gas.

=== Vacuum MD ===
Vacuum MD contains an air gap channel configuration. Once it has passed through the membrane, the vapour is sucked out of the permeate channel and condenses outside the module as with SWGMD. VCMD and SWGMD can be applied for the separation of volatile substances from a watery solution or for the generation of pure water from concentrated salt water. One advantage of this method is that undissolved inert gasses blocking the membrane pores are sucked out by the vacuum, leaving a larger effective membrane surface active. Furthermore, a reduction of the boiling point results in a comparable amount of product at lower overall temperatures and lower temperature differences through the membrane. A lower required temperature difference leaves a lower total- and specific thermal energy demand. However, the generation of a vacuum, which must be adjusted to the salt water temperature, requires complex technical equipment and is therefore a disadvantage to this method. The electrical energy demand is a lot higher as with DCMD and AGMD. An additional problem is the increase of the pH value due to the removal of CO_{2} from the feed water. For vacuum membrane distillation to be efficient, it is often run in multistage configurations.

=== Permeate-gap MD ===
In the following, the principle channel configuration and operating method of a standard DCMD module as well as a DCMD module with separate permeate gap shall be explained. The design in the adjacent image depicts a flat channel configuration, but can also be understood as a schema for flat-, hollow fibre - or spiral wound modules.

The complete channel configuration consists of a condenser channel with inlet and outlet and an evaporator channel with inlet and outlet. These two channels are separated by the hydrophobic, micro porous membrane. For cooling, the condenser channel is flooded with fresh water and the evaporator e.g. with salty feed water. The coolant enters the condenser channel at a temperature of 20 °C (68 °F). After passing through the membrane, the vapour condenses in the cooling water, releasing its latent heat and leading to a temperature increase in the coolant. Sensible heat conduction also heats the cooling water through the surface of the membrane. Due to the mass transport through the membrane the mass flow in the evaporator decreases whilst the condenser channel increases by the same amount. The mass flow of pre-heated coolant leaves the condenser channel at a temperature of about 72 °C (162 °F) and enters a heat exchanger, thus pre-heating the feed water. This feed water is then delivered to a further heat source and finally enters the evaporator channel of the MD module at a temperature of 80 °C (176 °F). The evaporation process extracts latent heat from the feed flow, which cools down the feed increasingly in flow direction. Additional heat reduction occurs due to sensible heat passing through the membrane. The cooled feed water leaves the evaporator channel at approximately 28 °C. Total temperature differences between condenser inlet and evaporator outlet and condenser inlet and evaporator outlet are about equal. In a PGMD module, the permeate channel is separated from the condenser channel by a condensation surface. This enables the direct use of a salt water feed as coolant, since it does not come into contact with the permeate. Considering this, the cooling-or feed water entering the condenser channel at a temperature T1 can now also be used to cool the permeate. Condensation of vapour takes place inside the liquid permeate. Pre-heated feed water that was used to cool the condenser can be conducted directly to a heat source for final heating, after leaving the condenser at a temperature T2. After it has reached temperature T3 it is guided into the evaporator. Permeate is extracted at temperature T5 and the cooled brine is discharged at temperature T4.

An advantage of PGMD over DCMD is the direct use of feed water as cooling liquid inside the module and therefore the necessity of only one heat exchanger to heat the feed before entering the evaporator. Hereby heat conduction losses are reduced and expensive components can be cut. A further advantage is the separation of permeate from coolant. Therefore, the permeate does not have to be extracted later in the process and the coolant's mass flow in the condenser channel remains constant. The low flow velocity of the permeate in the permeate gap is a disadvantage of this configuration, as it leads to a poor heat conduction from the membrane surface to the condenser walling. High temperatures on the permeate side's membrane bounding surface are the result of this effect (temperature polarisation), which lowers the vapour pressure difference and therefore the driving force of the process. However, it is beneficial, that the heat conduction losses through the membrane are also lowered by this effect. This poor gap heat conduction challenge is largely removed with a variant of PGMD called CGMD, or conductive gap membrane distillation, which adds thermally conductive spacers to the gaps. Compared to AGMD, in PGMD or CGMD, a higher surface related permeate output is achieved, as the mass flow is not additionally inhibited by the diffusion resistance of an air layer.

== Membrane Distillation Configurations ==
Configuration	Working Principle	Advantages	Disadvantages	Typical Applications
DCMD (Direct Contact MD)	Direct contact between hot and cold liquid	High vapor transfer efficiency	Significant heat loss due to conduction	Desalination, wastewater treatment, food and pharma industries
AGMD (Air Gap MD)	Air gap between membrane and condensation surface	Reduced heat loss due to insulation effect	Lower permeate flux compared to DCMD	Desalination, pharmaceutical and food industries
VMD (Vacuum MD)	Vacuum applied on the cold side to enhance vapor transfer	Increased permeability and reduced heat loss	Complex equipment and precise vacuum control required	Volatile solvent separation, desalination, chemical and pharmaceutical industries
SGMD (Sweeping Gas MD)	Sweeping gas removes vapor from the membrane surface	Better control of heat and mass transfer without vacuum	Generally lower efficiency at high flow rates	Industrial water recovery, pharmaceutical and food industry applications

The table above summarizes the main configurations of membrane distillation (MD), highlighting their working principles, advantages, and limitations. The choice of a particular MD configuration depends on the specific application requirements, operating conditions, and cost-efficiency considerations.

While DCMD is widely used due to its simplicity and high vapor transfer efficiency, it suffers from significant conductive heat loss, which reduces overall energy efficiency. AGMD attempts to address this by introducing an air gap that acts as thermal insulation, at the cost of lower permeate flux. VMD improves mass transfer by applying a vacuum on the permeate side, but requires more complex equipment and precise vacuum control. SGMD uses a sweeping gas to remove vapor and control heat transfer without vacuum, yet it generally shows lower efficiency at high flow rates.

Current research focuses on overcoming challenges such as membrane pore wetting and heat loss through conduction, by developing advanced membrane materials and hybrid process configurations. These advances aim to increase membrane durability, improve separation performance, and reduce energy consumption, enabling broader industrial application of membrane distillation.

=== Vacuum multi-effect membrane distillation ===
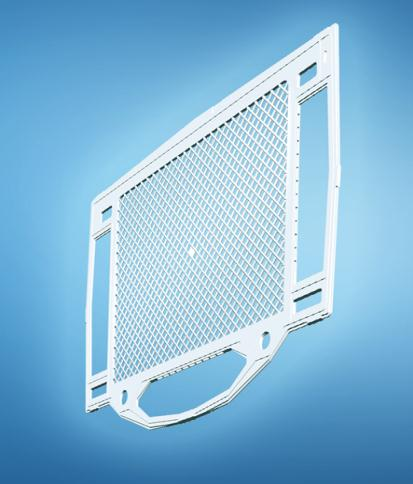
The hydrophobic membranes (or PP foils) are welded at both sides of the memsys frame. This frame are designed to combine and distribute vapor, feed, non condensable gas and distillate flows.

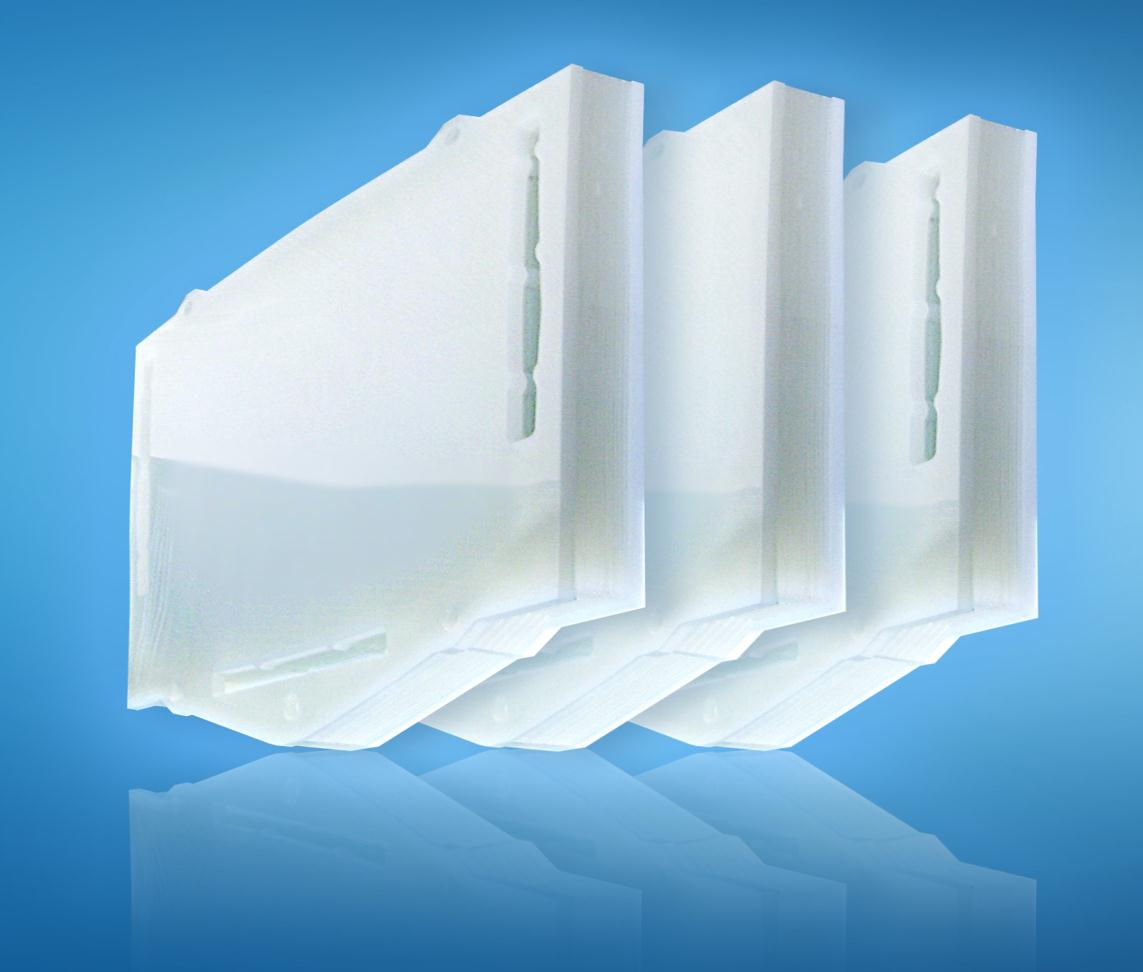
Different numbers of memsys frame are vibration welded as memsys module (e.g. steam raiser, membrane stage and condenser). GOR and capacity of memsys module can be easily modified deponding on the application or customer's needs.

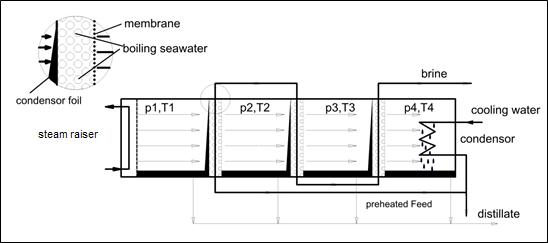
Diagram of memsys V-MEMD process

The typical vacuum multi-effect membrane distillation (e.g. the memsys brand V-MEMD) module consists of a steam raiser, evaporation–condensation stages, and a condenser. Each stage recovers the heat of condensation, providing a multiple-effect design. Distillate is produced in each evaporation–condensation stage and in the condenser.

Steam raiser: The heat produced by the external heat source (e.g. solar thermal or waste heat) is exchanged in the steam raiser. The water in the steam raiser is at lower pressure (e.g. 400 hPa), compared to the ambient. The hot steam flows to the first evaporation–condensation stage (stage 1).

Evaporation–condensation stages: Stages are composed of alternative hydrophobic membrane and foil (Polypropylene, PP) frames. Feed (e.g. seawater) is introduced into stage 1 of the module. Feed flows serially through the evaporation–condensation stages. At the end of last stage, it is ejected as brine.

Stage 1: Steam from the evaporator condenses on a PP foil at pressure level P1 and corresponding temperature T1. The combination of a foil and a hydrophobic membrane creates a channel for the feed, where the feed is heated by the heat of condensation of the vapour from the steam raiser. Feed evaporates under the negative pressure P2. The vacuum is always applied to the permeate side of the membranes.

Stage [2, 3, 4, x]: This process is replicated in further stages and each stage is at a lower pressure and temperature.

Condenser: The vapour produced in the final evaporation–condensation stage is condensed in the condenser, using the coolant flow (e.g. seawater).

Distillate production: Condensed distillate is transported via the bottom of each stage by pressure difference between stages.

Design of memsys module: Inside each memsys frame, and between frames, channels are created. Foil frames are the ‘distillate channels’. Membrane frames are the ‘vapour channels’. Between foil and membrane frames, ‘feed channels’ are created. Vapour enters the stage and flows into parallel foil frames. The only option of for the vapour entering the foil frames is to condense, i.e. vapour enters a ‘dead-end’ foil frame. Although it is called a ‘dead-end’ frame, it does contain a small channel to remove the non-condensable gases and to apply the vacuum.

The condensed vapour flows into a distillate channel. The heat of condensation is transported through the foil and is immediately converted into evaporation energy, generating new vapour in the seawater feed channel. The feed channel is limited by one condensing foil and a membrane. The vapour leaves the membrane channels and is collected in a main vapour channel. The vapour leaves the stage via this channel and enters the next stage. Memsys has developed a highly automated production line for the modules and could be easily extended. As the memsys process works at modest low temperatures (less than 90 °C or 194 °F) and moderate negative pressure, all module components are made of polypropylene (PP). This eliminates corrosion and scaling and allows large-scale cost efficient production.

== Applications ==
Typical applications of membrane distillation are:

- Seawater desalination
- Brackish water desalination
- Desalination brine treatment
- Process water treatment
- Water purification
- Removal/Concentration of ammonium
- Resource concentration

== Solar-powered membrane distillation ==
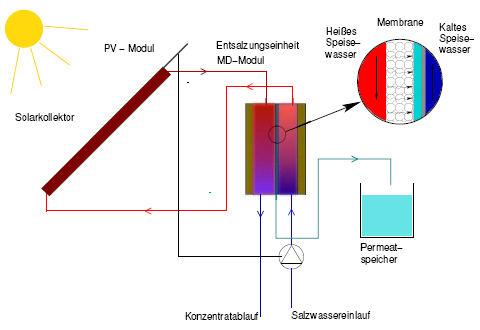
Plant design of a compact system

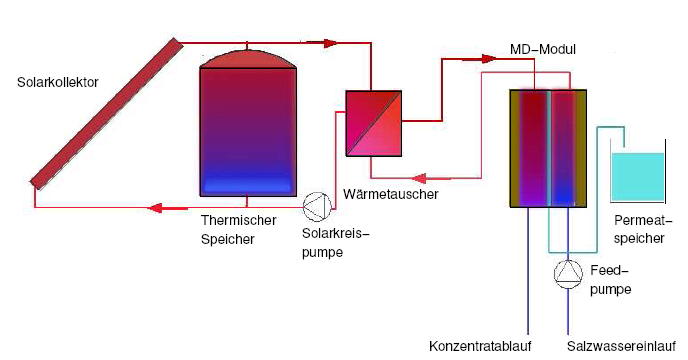
Plant design of a two loop system

Membrane distillation is very suitable for compact, solar powered desalination units providing small and medium range output less than 10,000 litres per day (2,600 US gal/d). Especially the spiral wound design patented by GORE in the year 1985 suits this application. Within the MEMDIS project, which kicked off in 2003, the Fraunhofer Institute for Solar Energy Systems ISE began developing MD modules as well as installing and analysing two different solar powered operating systems, together with other project partners. The first system type is a so-called compact system, designed to produce a drinking water output of 100–120 litres per day (26–32 US gal/d) from sea-or brackish water. The main aim of the system design is a simple, self-sufficient, low maintenance and robust plant for target markets in arid and semi-arid areas of low infrastructure. The second system type is a so-called two-loop plant with a capacity of around 2,000 litres per day (530 US gal/d). Here, the collector circuit is separated from the desalination circuit by a saltwater resistant heat exchanger. Based on these two system types, a various number of prototypes were developed, installed and observed.

The standard configuration of today's (2011) compact system is able to produce a distillate output of up to 150 litres per day (40 US gal/d). The required thermal energy is supplied by a 6.5 m^{2} (70 sq ft) solar thermal collector field. Electrical energy is supplied by a 75 W PV-module. This system type is currently being developed further and marketed by the Solar Spring GmbH, a spin-off of the Fraunhofer Institute for Solar Energy Systems. Within the MEDIRAS project, a further EU-project, an enhanced two-loop system was installed on the Island of Gran Canaria. Built inside a 6.1 m (20 ft) container and equipped with a collector aray size of 225 m^{2} (2,420 sq ft), a heat storage tank makes a distillate output of up to 3,000 litres per day (790 US gal/d) possible. Further applications with up to 5,000 litres per day (1,300 US gal/d) have also been implemented, either 100% solar powered or as hybrid projects in combination with waste heat.

Exemplary systems

== Challenges ==
The operation of membrane distillation systems faces several major barriers that may impair operation, or prevent it from being a viable option. The principal challenge is membrane wetting, where saline feed leaks through the membrane, contaminating the permeate. This is especially caused by membrane fouling, where particulates, salts, or organic matter deposit on the membrane surface. Techniques to mitigate fouling include membrane superhydrophobicity, air backwashing to reverse or prevent wetting, choosing non-fouling operating conditions, and maintaining air layers on the membrane surface.

The single biggest challenge for membrane distillation to be cost effective is the energy efficiency. Commercial systems have not reached competitive energy consumption compared to the leading thermal technologies such as Multiple-effect distillation, although some have been close, and research has shown potential for significant improvements on energy efficiency.

== Literature ==
- H. E. Hoemig: Seawater and Seawater Distillation Vulkan-Verlag, 1978, 3802724380
- Winter, D.; Koschikowski, J.; Wieghaus, M.:Desalination using membrane distillation: Experimental studies on full scale spiral wound modules. Fraunhofer ISE, Freiburg 2011.
- E. Curcio, E. Drioli: "Membrane Distillation and Related Operations—A Review", Separation & Purification Reviews 34/1 35–85, 2005.
