= Urethane =

Urethane may refer to:

- Ethyl carbamate, a chemical compound which is an ester of carbamic acid
- Polyurethane, a polymer composed of a chain of organic units joined by carbamate (urethane) links
- Carbamate, an organic compound derived from carbamic acid

== See also ==
- Acetone
- Cetone
