= Α-Isomethyl ionone =

α-Isomethyl ionone

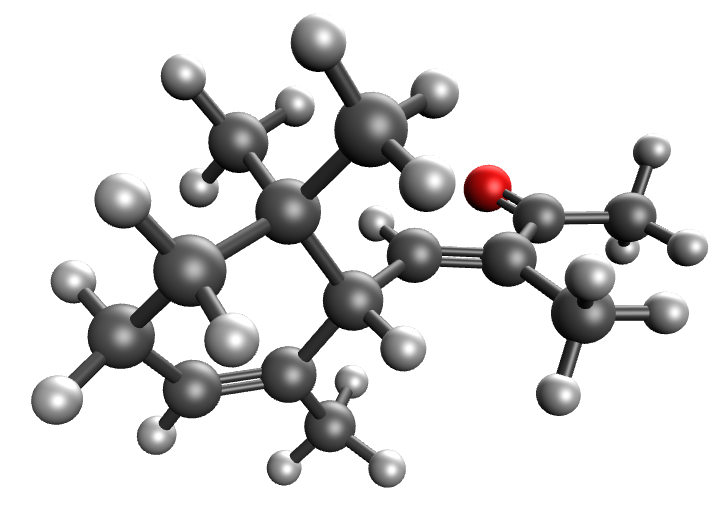

Names
- IUPAC name (3E)-3-methyl-4-(2,6,6-trimethylcyclohex-2-en-1-yl)but-3-en-2-one
- Other names α-Cetone; Cetone Alpha; Isomethyl-α-ionone

Identifiers
CAS Number	127-51-5
3D model (JSmol)	Interactive image
ChEBI	CHEBI:179835
ChEMBL	ChEMBL3183353
ChemSpider	4522510
ECHA InfoCard	100.004.407
EC Number	204-846-3
PubChem CID	5372174
UNII	9XP4LC555B
CompTox Dashboard (EPA)	DTXSID10859248 DTXSID7027047, DTXSID10859248
- InChI: InChI=1S/C14H22O/c1-10-7-6-8-14(4,5)13(10)9-11(2)12(3)15/h7,9,13H,6,8H2,1-5H3/b11-9+ Key: JRJBVWJSTHECJK-PKNBQFBNSA-N
- SMILES: CC(=O)C(\C)=C\C1C(C)=CCCC1(C)C

Properties
Chemical formula	C_{14}H_{22}O
Molar mass	206.3239
Appearance	liquid
Density	0.93 gcm −3 (20 °C)
Boiling point	93 °C (199 °F; 366 K) (3.1 mmHg)
Solubility in water	0.064 g/L

Hazards
- Occupational safety and health (OHS/OSH)
Main hazards	irritant, environmental hazard
- GHS labelling
Pictograms	(GHS07: Exclamation mark) (GHS09: Environmental hazard)
Signal word	Warning
Hazard statements	H315, H317, H319, H411, H412
Precautionary statements	P261, P264, P272, P273, P280, P302+P352, P305+P351+P338, P321, P332+P313, P333+P313, P337+P313, P362, P363, P391, P501
- Except where otherwise noted, data are given for materials in their standard state (at 25 °C [77 °F], 100 kPa). Infobox references

α-Isomethyl ionone, also known as α-cetone, is a synthetically made and naturally occurring organic compound found in Brewer's yeasts or the species known as Saccharomyces cerevisiae. The compound is an isomer of methyl ionone. Alpha-isomethyl ionone can be colorless or pale-straw coloured liquid. Its primary scent is flowery and secondary scent is violet. It may also have a woody or orris-like scent. and is often used in flavouring and cosmetic industries for example, aftershave lotions, bath products, hair care products, moisturizers, perfumes, shampoos and skin care products. It is also an ingredient used in Chanel No. 5, and other branded products such as Fidji by Guy Laroche. Perfume fragrances that α-isomethyl ionone is used in are for example, amber, chypre, violet, mimosa, reseda, iris, orris, cyclamen, chypre, berries, woody notes, ylang-ylang, leather, orange, nut, pistachio, muscatel, and tobacco.

== Properties ==
Chanel No.5 Perfume

α-Isomethyl ionone would be classified as a norsesquiterpenoid, having 14 carbon atoms (1 less than the 15 of three consecutive isoprene units). It is an extremely weak base, the calculated pK_{a} values within the molecule being 19.7 (strongest acidic) and −4.8 (strongest basic). The percentage of α-isomethyl ionone used in perfumes is approximately ranging from 0.1% to 11.9%, with an average of 1.1%. For example, it is usually used in conjunction with hydroxycitronellal, woody notes, copaiba, N-methyl ionone, ionone, or Vetiver.

== Synthesis ==
The synthesis of α-isomethyl ionone involves a cross-aldol condensation of citral with methyl ethyl ketone A high temperature and strong alkali is used. The ratio between the n-form and iso-form is controlled in order to obtain methyl pseudo-ionone and allow ring formation to occur. Iso-forms is then synthesized consequently.
