= Leps =

Leps or LEPS may refer to:

- Adrien L. J. Leps (1893–?), French World War I flying ace
- Ando Leps (1935–2023), Estonian politician
- Ergas Leps (born 1939), Canadian middle-distance runner
- Grigory Leps (born 1962), Russian singer-songwriter
- Wassili Leps (1870–1942), Russian-born American composer and conductor
- Leps, Saxony-Anhalt, Germany, a village and former municipality
- Laser Electron Photon Experiment at SPring-8 (LEPS), a physics experiment
- Butterflies and moths, collectively known as Lepidoptera

== See also ==
- LEP (disambiguation)
