= Ascorbyl glucoside =

Names
- IUPAC name (2R)-2-[(1S)-1,2-Dihydroxyethyl]-3-hydroxy-4-[(2R,3R,4S,5S,6R)-3,4,5-trihydroxy-6-(hydroxymethyl)oxan-2-yl]oxy-2H-furan-5-one
- Other names Ascorbic acid 2-O-glucoside; 2-O-alpha-D-Glucopyranosyl-L-ascorbic acid; AA-2G; L-Ascorbic acid 2-O-alpha-glucoside

Identifiers
CAS Number	129499-78-1
3D model (JSmol)	Interactive image
ChEBI	CHEBI:81685
ChEMBL	ChEMBL2011961
ChemSpider	18678797
DrugBank	DB11335
ECHA InfoCard	100.114.373
EC Number	603-337-7
KEGG	C18339
PubChem CID	54693473
UNII	2V52R0NHXW
CompTox Dashboard (EPA)	DTXSID50926423
- InChI: InChI=1S/C12H18O11/c13-1-3(15)9-8(19)10(11(20)22-9)23-12-7(18)6(17)5(16)4(2-14)21-12/h3-7,9,12-19H,1-2H2/t3-,4+,5+,6-,7+,9+,12+/m0/s1 Key: MLSJBGYKDYSOAE-DCWMUDTNSA-N
- SMILES: C([C@@H]1[C@H]([C@@H]([C@H]([C@H](O1)OC2=C([C@H](OC2=O)[C@H](CO)O)O)O)O)O)O

Properties
Chemical formula	C_{12}H_{18}O_{11}
Molar mass	338.265 g·mol^{−1}
- Except where otherwise noted, data are given for materials in their standard state (at 25 °C [77 °F], 100 kPa). Infobox references

Ascorbyl glucoside (AA-2G) is an ascorbic acid derivative that contains at least one glycosyl group. Ascorbyl glucoside is commonly used in cosmetic products to administer vitamin C topically. Ascorbyl glucoside exhibits superior stability and penetration ability compared to ascorbyl phosphate salts, but the rate of its in vivo conversion to ascorbic acid is not known. Ascorbyl glucosides such as AA-2G, like many other derivatives of the ascorbic acid, show antiscorbutic effects. It is also sometimes used in skin whitening products.

Ascorbyl glucoside is synthesized through a glycosylation process catalyzed by glycosyltransferase-class enzymes.

== See also ==
- Ascorbyl palmitate
