= Orris oil =

Oil obtained from the root of iris × germanica

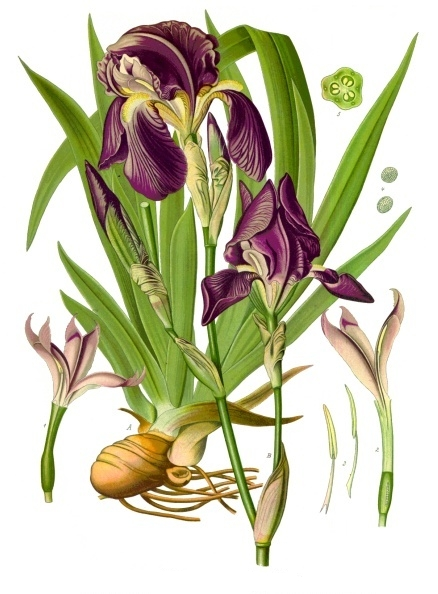
An illustration of the Iris germanica

Orris oil (orris butter or Beurre d'Iris) is an essential oil derived from irises, particularly Iris germanica. It is sometimes used as a flavoring agent and as an ingredient in perfume production. It can also have uses in body lotions.

== Storage and use ==
The rhizomes (roots) must be stored in a cool, dry location for three years to develop the scent. The fresh rhizomes are almost odorless.

The distilled oil solidifies in the receiver as a wax-like and cream-colored mass known as orris concrete. It is solid because of the high content of myristic acid (85%), a white stearin-like substance.

Orris concrete melts when it reaches around body temperature. It has a woody, fatty-oily, yet distinctly violet-like odor: sweet floral, warm & tenacious with a fruity undertone. Orris concrete is used in perfumery when the presence of myristic acid is not prohibitive, e.g.: in soap perfumes where the weak acid only acts as a fixative. The methyl and ethyl esters of myristic acid are often used for blending in violet type perfume bases. The high costs of orris oil production limit its application.
