= Phenoxyethanol =

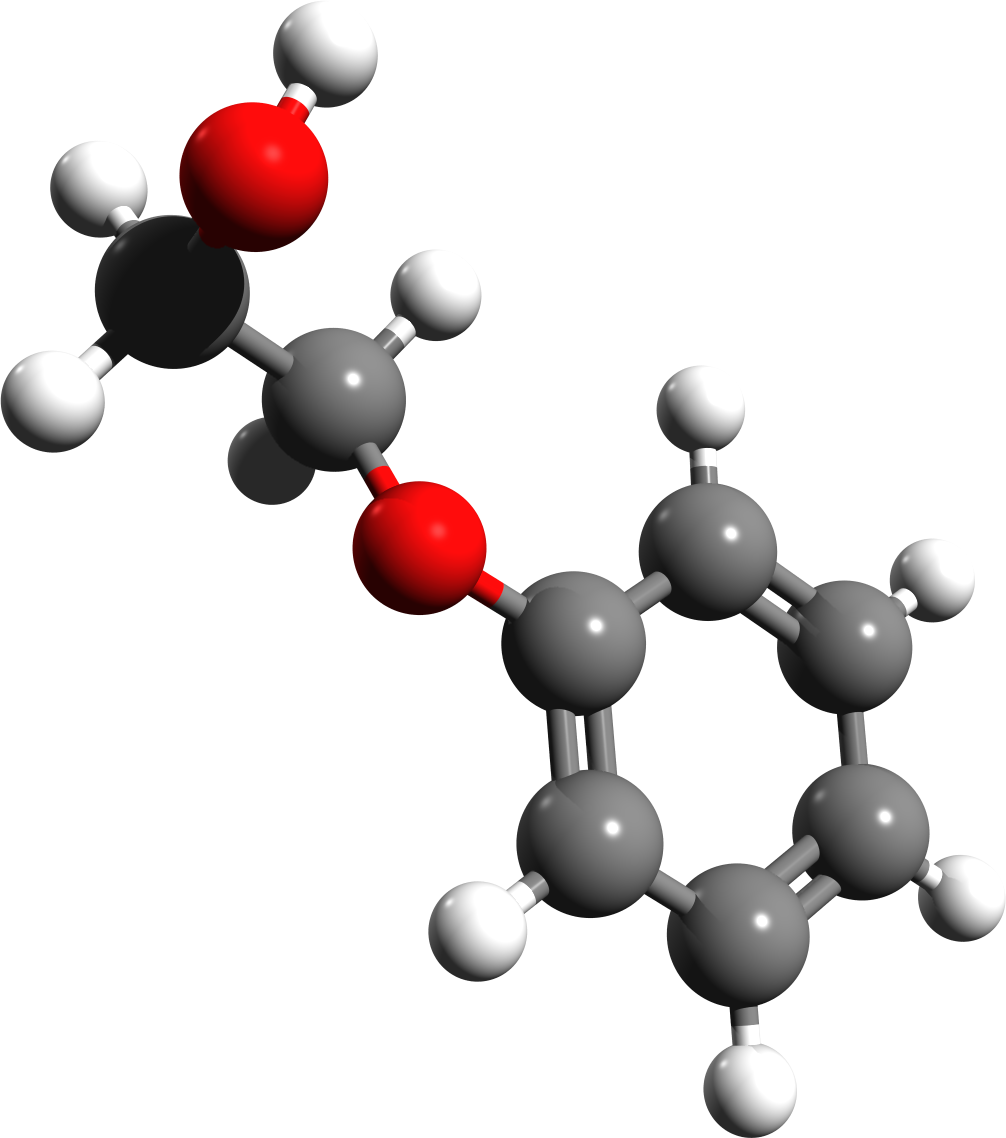

Names
- Preferred IUPAC name 2-Phenoxyethan-1-ol
- Other names Phenoxyethanol; Ethylene glycol monophenyl ether Phenoxytolarosol; Dowanol EP / EPH; Protectol PE; Emery 6705; Rose ether 1-Hydroxy-2-phenoxyethane β-hydroxyethyl phenyl ether Phenyl cellosolve Phenoxetol

Identifiers
CAS Number	122-99-6
3D model (JSmol)	Interactive image
ChEBI	CHEBI:64275
ChEMBL	ChEMBL1229846
ChemSpider	13848467
ECHA InfoCard	100.004.173
PubChem CID	31236
UNII	HIE492ZZ3T
CompTox Dashboard (EPA)	DTXSID90873407 DTXSID9021976, DTXSID90873407
- InChI: InChI=1S/C8H10O2/c9-6-7-10-8-4-2-1-3-5-8/h1-5,9H,6-7H2 Key: QCDWFXQBSFUVSP-UHFFFAOYSA-N; InChI=1/C8H10O2/c9-6-7-10-8-4-2-1-3-5-8/h1-5,9H,6-7H2 Key: QCDWFXQBSFUVSP-UHFFFAOYAU
- SMILES: c1ccc(cc1)OCCO

Properties
Chemical formula	C_{8}H_{10}O_{2}
Molar mass	138.166 g·mol^{−1}
Appearance	Colorless oily liquid
Odor	faint rose-like
Density	1.102 g/cm^{3}
Melting point	−2 °C (28 °F; 271 K)
Boiling point	247 °C (477 °F; 520 K)
Solubility in water	26 g/kg
Solubility	Chloroform, Alkali, diethyl ether: soluble
Solubility in peanut oil	slightly
Solubility in olive oil	slightly
Solubility in acetone	miscible
Solubility in ethanol	miscible
Solubility in glycerol	miscible
Vapor pressure	0.001 kPa (0.00015 psi)
Thermal conductivity	0.169 W/(m⋅K)
Refractive index (n_{D})	1.534 (20 °C)

Hazards
- Occupational safety and health (OHS/OSH)
Main hazards	Harmful if swallowed Causes serious eye irritation
- GHS labelling
Pictograms	(GHS07: Exclamation mark)
Signal word	Warning
NFPA 704 (fire diamond)	3 1 0
Flash point	126 °C (259 °F; 399 K)
Autoignition temperature	430 °C (806 °F; 703 K)
- Lethal dose or concentration (LD, LC)
LD_{50} (median dose)	1850 mg/kg (rat, oral)

Related compounds
Related compounds	phenetole
- Except where otherwise noted, data are given for materials in their standard state (at 25 °C [77 °F], 100 kPa). verify (what is ?) Infobox references

Phenoxyethanol is the organic compound with the formula C_{6}H_{5}OC_{2}H_{4}OH. It is a colorless oily liquid. It can be classified as a glycol ether and a phenol ether. It is a common preservative in vaccine formulations. It has a faint rose-like aroma.

== Use ==
Phenoxyethanol has germicidal and germistatic properties. It is often used together with quaternary ammonium compounds. In the cosmetic industry, a common and effective synergistic strategy is to combine phenoxyethanol with ethylhexylglycerin (9:1). This pairing broadens the antimicrobial spectrum, while allowing each component to be used at lower concentrations.

Phenoxyethanol is used as a perfume fixative; an insect repellent; an antiseptic; a solvent for cellulose acetate, dyes, inks, and resins; a preservative for pharmaceuticals, cosmetics and lubricants; an anesthetic in fish aquaculture; and in organic synthesis.

It is an alternative to formaldehyde-releasing preservatives. In Japan and the European Union, its concentration in cosmetics is restricted to 1%.

== History and synthesis ==
Phenoxyethanol was first prepared by W. H. Perkin Jr. and his graduate student Edward Haworth in 1896. They reacted sodium, phenol and 2-chloroethanol in anhydrous ethanol. Starting from the 1920s, it has been commercially available as a cellulose acetate solvent under the trademark of "Phenyl cellosolve".

The compound is produced in the industry by the hydroxyethylation of phenol (Williamson synthesis), for example, in the presence of alkali-metal hydroxides or alkali-metal borohydrides.

== Efficacy ==
Phenoxyethanol is effective against gram-negative and gram-positive bacteria, and the yeast Candida albicans.

Effective concentration and contact time to kill germs with aromatic alcohols
Aromatic alcohol	Concentration (%)	Contact time (minutes)			
Aromatic alcohol	Concentration (%)	Escherichia coli	Pseudomonas aeruginosa	Proteus mirabilis	Staphylococcus aureus
Benzyl alcohol	1	>30	>30	>30	>30
Phenethyl alcohol	1.25	2.5	2.5	2.5	>30
Phenethyl alcohol	2.5	2.5	2.5	2.5	5
Phenoxyethanol	1.25	15	2.5	2.5	>30
Phenoxyethanol	2.5	2.5	2.5	2.5	>30

== Safety ==
Phenoxyethanol is a vaccine preservative and potential allergen, which may result in a nodular reaction at the site of injection. Possible symptoms include rashes, eczema, and possible death. It reversibly inhibits NMDAR-mediated ion currents.

== Environmental considerations ==
In view of phenoxyethanol's widespread use, its biodegradation has been examined. One pathway entails initial conversion to phenol and acetaldehyde.
