= Ethylhexylglycerin =

Names
- IUPAC name 3-[(2-Ethylhexyl)oxy]-1,2-propanediol
- Other names Octoxyglycerin

Identifiers
CAS Number	70445-33-9
3D model (JSmol)	Interactive image
ChemSpider	8034793
ECHA InfoCard	100.100.951
EC Number	408-080-2
PubChem CID	9859093
UNII	147D247K3P
CompTox Dashboard (EPA)	DTXSID80990652
- InChI: InChI=1S/C11H24O3/c1-3-5-6-10(4-2)8-14-9-11(13)7-12/h10-13H,3-9H2,1-2H3 Key: NCZPCONIKBICGS-UHFFFAOYSA-N
- SMILES: OC(COCC(CCCC)CC)CO

Properties
Chemical formula	C_{11}H_{24}O_{3}
Molar mass	204.310 g·mol^{−1}

Hazards
- GHS labelling
Pictograms	(GHS05: Corrosive) (GHS07: Exclamation mark)
Signal word	Danger
Hazard statements	H312, H318, H412
Precautionary statements	P273, P280, P302+P352, P305+P351+P338, P310, P312, P322, P363, P501
- Except where otherwise noted, data are given for materials in their standard state (at 25 °C [77 °F], 100 kPa). Infobox references

Ethylhexylglycerin, or octoxyglycerin, is a glyceryl ether that is commonly used as part of a preservative system in cosmetic preparations. It is commonly combined with phenoxyethanol at a 1:9 ratio as a preservative and is widely used in personal care formulations, including cosmetics and shampoos. The most well-known product of this type is Ashland's Euxyl PE 9010.
