= Ingredients of cosmetics =

Ingredients used in makeup

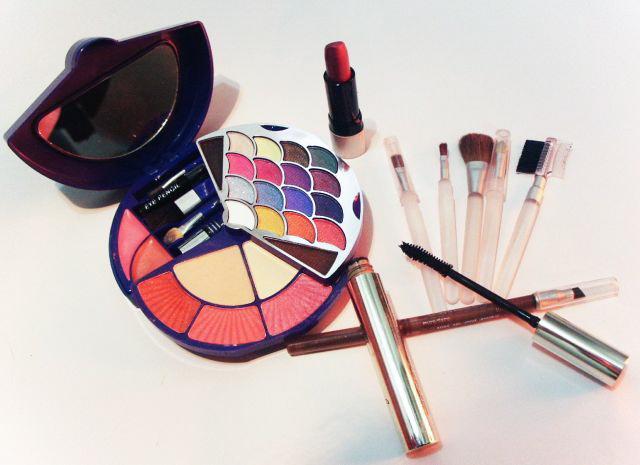
Assorted cosmetics and tools

Cosmetics ingredients come from a variety of sources but, unlike the ingredients of food, are often not considered by most consumers. Cosmetics often use vibrant colors that are derived from a wide variety of sources, ranging from crushed insects to rust.

Cosmetics in a variety of forms date back to early civilizations, with the need to improve ones personal appearance being an important factor in attracting a mate. Over the years the ingredients have changed dramatically as we discovered how to manufacture our own scents and cosmetic formulas. The realization of the dangers of many common ingredients also greatly affected the growing industry. Ancient Egyptian aristocracy made use of minerals to provide colour and definition to their facial features. During the era of the Greek Empire it was common to use face paints, while cosmetics in ancient Rome contained starch, olive oil, beeswax, saffron, rose water, and lead.

== Common ingredients ==
Castor oil and its derivatives are found in many cosmetics as it is "non-comedogenic" (does not exacerbate or contribute to acne).

Cerebrosides (cells from the nervous systems of cattle or swine) were once used in some high-end skin-care products to increase moisture retention and to create a smooth skin surface, however the BSE controversy has put an end to this practice.

In many countries colors in cosmetics are listed as numbers from the Colour Index International. The scheme covers colors used in food, personal care products, cosmetics, household products and fabric dyeing. For example, tartrazine is not normally listed as such in lipstick ingredients, but as C.I. 19140. Erythrosine will be listed as C.I. 45430, and so on. In US and Canada colors are listed as FD & C colors. Tartrazine (E102) is FD & C Yellow 5 and erythrosine (E127) is FD & C Red 3.

=== Visual effects ===
Strong red colors for eye products have been produced using the dye carmine, made from carminic acid extracted from the crushed bodies of the cochineal insect. Carmine was once the only bright red color permitted by the FDA for use around the eye.

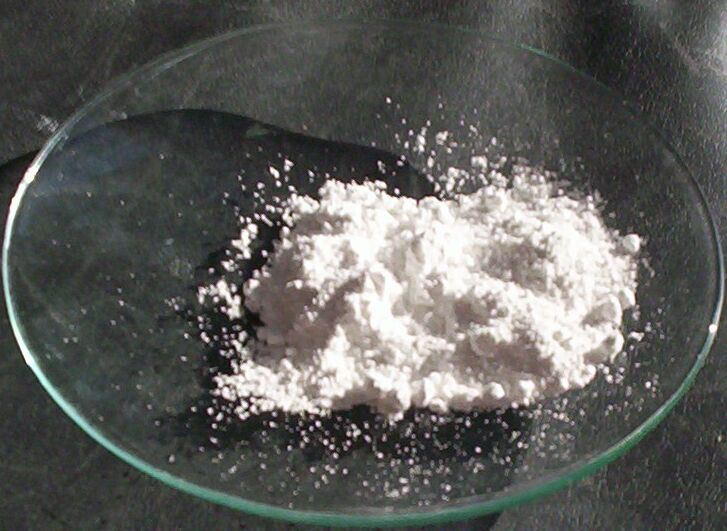
Titanium dioxide

Pearlescence, also sometimes spelled as "pearl essence", is a shine or gloss effect commonly used in a wide variety of cosmetic products. The most usual source of pearlescence is the natural mineral mica covered by a thin layer of titanium dioxide. This coating causes goniochromism – the color appears through interference effects with the naturally translucent mica, and varying the thickness of the titanium dioxide changes the color. Alternatives exist, including the suspension of tiny flakes of a suitable material within the product, often a wax such as glycol distearate. A shimmery substance found on fish scales, most usually obtained from herring and one of many by-products of commercial fish processing, can also be used for pearlescent effects, primarily in nail polish, but is now rarely used due to its high cost, bismuth oxychloride flakes being used as a substitute instead.

== Types of cosmetics ==
=== Facial cosmetics ===
The Romans and ancient Egyptians used cosmetics containing mercury.

==== Foundation ====
Women of Roman Britain used a foundation made from animal fat, starch and tin oxide. Today foundations come in a wide variety of formulas and finishes, most being either water, silicone, or mineral based. Foundations on today's market come in cream, liquid, pressed powder, loose powder, or mineral form. They also come in different finishes such as matte or satin depending upon the desired look.

==== Lipstick ====
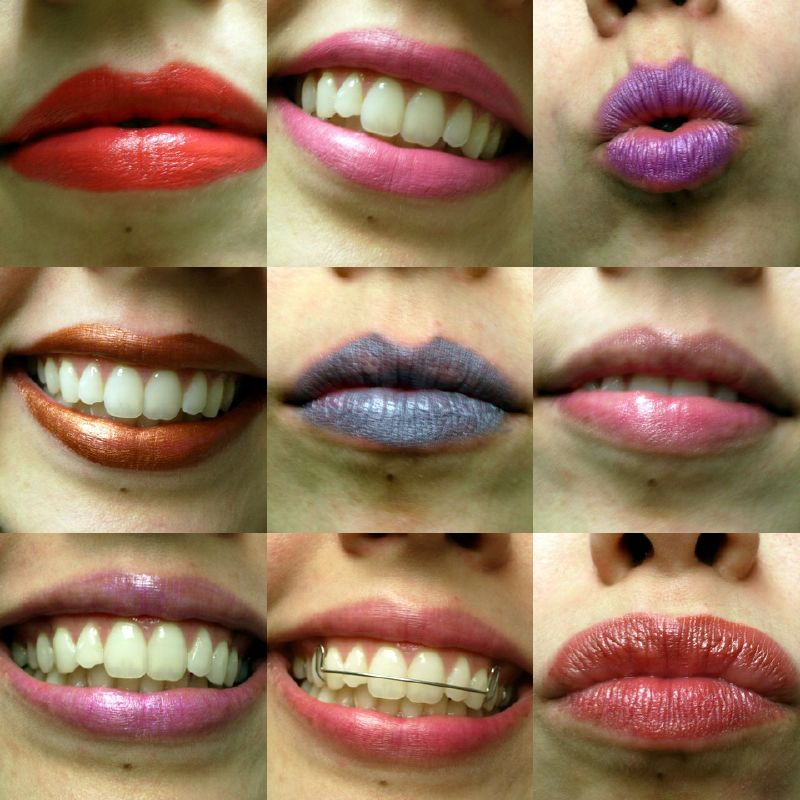
Lips with various shades of lipstick applied.

Lipstick is known to have been used around 5000 years ago in ancient Babylon, when semi-precious jewels were crushed and applied to the lips and occasionally around the eyes. Ancient Egyptians extracted purplish-red dye from fucus-algin, 0.01% iodine, and some bromine mannite, which resulted in serious illness. Cleopatra had her lipstick made from crushed carmine beetles, which gave a deep red pigment, and ants for a base.

The red color of modern lipstick can come from synthetically derived pure iron oxide (common iron rust), however most leading brands use the more economical synthetic colors. In the United States, every batch of synthetic dye and pigment must have a sample sent to the US FDA for testing and certification that the batch is pure and its contaminants are below the levels specified by law. Synthetic colors are listed in the ingredients as a code (e.g.: F &D red no 6) and may contain up to 10 parts per million of lead / 3 parts per million of arsenic. There is some controversy over the presence of these trace ingredients, especially since makeup worn on the lips is not just absorbed through the skin, but also swallowed with drinking and eating. Since lowering these levels would make the production and sale of practically all lipstick illegal, and since the FDA has determined that the existing levels are safe, the cosmetic industry continues to produce and sell lipstick.

Typically, the pigment is crushed very finely (7 to 10 micrometres) while being mixed with castor oil and is then mixed with a wax base to form a finished lipstick.

Lipsticks may be sheer or dense, matte or shiny. In their thinnest and most fluid consistency they are given their own category, lipgloss.

=== Perfume ===
Islamic cultures contributed significantly in the development of western perfumery in both perfecting the extraction of fragrances through steam distillation and introducing new, raw ingredients. Both of the raw ingredients and distillation technology significantly influenced western perfumery and scientific developments, particularly chemistry.

As traders, Islamic cultures such as the Arabs and Persians had wider access to different spices, herbals, and other fragrance material. In addition to trading them, many of these exotic materials were cultivated by the Muslims such that they can be successfully grown outside of their native climates. Two examples of this include jasmine, which is native to South and Southeast Asia, and various citrus, which are native to East Asia. Both of these ingredients are still highly important in modern perfumery.

The Crusaders brought alcohol-based perfumes back to Europe from the Middle East in the 13th Century. The first modern perfume, made of scented oils blended in an alcohol solution, was made in 1370 at the command of Queen Elizabeth of Hungary and was known throughout Europe as Hungary Water. France quickly became the European center of perfume and cosmetic manufacture, cultivating vast amounts of flowers for their essence.

=== Deodorants and antiperspirants ===
Perfume has been used to mask body odor for many hundreds of years, but in the late 19th century the ability to reduce such odour was developed. The original active ingredient of antiperspirants was aluminium chloride but complaints of skin irritation led to the increased use of aluminium chlorohydrate as an alternative. Aluminium has been established as a neurotoxin and has been shown to adversely affect the blood–brain barrier, cause DNA damage, and have adverse epigenetic effects. Research has shown that the aluminum salts used in antiperspirants have detrimental effects to a number of species such as non-human primates, mice, dogs and others. An experiment with mice found that applying an aqueous solution of aluminum chloride to the skin resulted in "a significant increase in urine, serum, and whole brain aluminium." Other experiments on pregnant mice showed transplacental passage of aluminum chloride.

== Regulation ==
Legislation varies from country to country but most countries have some sort of formal legislation that either restrict or prohibit certain ingredients or products. There are two main sources for cosmetics safety: the EU Cosmetics Regulation 1223/2009 and the Canadian Cosmetic Ingredient Hotlist. Regulation in the United States by the FDA is particularly weak.

A new version of the EU's Cosmetics Directive was adopted by the European Parliament, 24 March 2009. It includes new rules concerning the use of nanoparticles in cosmetics and includes stricter rules on animal testing of cosmetics. In the European Union, all cosmetic products must be notified through the Cosmetic Products Notification Portal (CPNP) before being placed on the EU market. The presence of a nanomaterial in a cosmetic product must be explicitly stated in the notification to the European Commission. A list of nanomaterial cosmetics ingredients was published by the European Commission, and the European Union Observatory for Nanomaterials (EUON) provides further information on these ingredients, including information derived from the application of the REACH regulation on chemicals.

Cosmetic colorants, with the exception of hair colorants in the United States, are highly regulated. Each country or group of countries has their own regulatory agency that controls what can go into cosmetics. In the United States, the regulating body is the Food and Drug Administration. Aside from color additives, cosmetic products and their ingredients are not subject to FDA regulation prior to their release into the market. It is only when a product is found to violate Federal Food, Drug, and Cosmetic Act (FD&C Act) and Fair Packaging and Labeling Act (FPLA) after its release that the FDA may start taking action against this violation. The FDA may request a recall if the company refuses to remove an unsafe product from the market, work with the Department of Justice to remove contaminated or misbranded products, request a restraining order to prevent further shipments of contaminated or misbranded products, and take action against the company violating the law. A company may use any ingredient, other than color additives and those ingredients banned from use in cosmetics through regulation, as long the completed product and its ingredients is safe, is properly labeled, and isn't contaminated or misbranded under the FD&C Act and the FPLA. FDA can and does perform inspections.

== Potential dangers ==
The search for new ingredients and products often brings controversy, typically over ingredients whose function is unproven or disputed.

There are a few potential dangers regarding the use of cosmetics. One such danger is the use of old mascara. Some mascaras contain an ingredient that breaks down to produce formaldehyde. The formaldehyde prevents the growth of bacteria. Aged mascara, however, may no longer be producing formaldehyde, allowing bacteria to proliferate. For this reason, it is often recommended to replace a tube of mascara every few months.

In one well-known case, Buddy Ebsen was originally cast as the "Tin Man" in The Wizard of Oz. Aluminum dust was used to create a tin effect. As the result of an allergic reaction, he was hospitalized and Jack Haley replaced him. Aluminum dust was, instead, added to a paste.

== See also ==
- List of cosmetic ingredients
- List of vegetable oils
- Palm oil
- International Nomenclature of Cosmetic Ingredients (INCI)
- Testing cosmetics on animals
