= Polyethylene glycol cetyl ether =

Names
- IUPAC name α-Hexadecyl-ω-hydroxypoly(oxyethylene)
- Other names Polyoxyethylene cetyl ether Brij 58; Brij 56; Brij 52

Identifiers
CAS Number	9004-95-9
3D model (JSmol)	Interactive image
ChemSpider	2006409
ECHA InfoCard	100.105.524
EC Number	500-014-1
PubChem CID	2724259
UNII	0EV3Z43Y2I
CompTox Dashboard (EPA)	DTXSID7046708 DTXSID60858847, DTXSID7046708
- InChI: InChI=1S/C56H114O21/c1-2-3-4-5-6-7-8-9-10-11-12-13-14-15-17-58-19-21-60-23-25-62-27-29-64-31-33-66-35-37-68-39-41-70-43-45-72-47-49-74-51-53-76-55-56-77-54-52-75-50-48-73-46-44-71-42-40-69-38-36-67-34-32-65-30-28-63-26-24-61-22-20-59-18-16-57/h57H,2-56H2,1H3 Key: NLMKTBGFQGKQEV-UHFFFAOYSA-N
- SMILES: CCCCCCCCCCCCCCCCOCCOCCOCCOCCOCCOCCOCCOCCOCCOCCOCCOCCOCCOCCOCCOCCOCCOCCOCCOCCO

Properties
Chemical formula	HO(C_{2}H_{4}O)_{n}C_{16}H_{33}

Hazards
- GHS labelling
Pictograms	(GHS07: Exclamation mark)
Signal word	Warning
Hazard statements	H302, H315
Precautionary statements	P264, P270, P280, P301+P312, P302+P352, P321, P330, P332+P313, P362, P501
- Except where otherwise noted, data are given for materials in their standard state (at 25 °C [77 °F], 100 kPa). Infobox references

Polyethylene glycol cetyl ether (polyethylene glycol hexadecyl ether) is a nonionic surfactant produced by the ethoxylation of cetyl alcohol to give a material with the general formula HO(C_{2}H_{4}O)_{n}C_{16}H_{33}. Several grades of this material are available depending on the level of ethoxylation performed, with repeat units (n) of polyethylene glycol varying between 2 and 20. Commercially it can be known as Cetomacrogol 1000, Brij 58 (when n=20), Brij 56 (when n=10), and other trade names.

It is used as a solubilizer and emulsifying agent in foods, cosmetics, and pharmaceuticals, often as an ointment base. It is used as an oil in water (O/W) emulsifier for creams/lotions, and a wetting agent.

== See also ==
- Isoceteth-20 - a similar material made using iso-cetyl alcohol
