= Vibration welding of thermoplastics =

Vibration welding (also known as linear or friction welding) refers to a process in which two workpieces are brought in contact under pressure, and a reciprocating motion (vibration) is applied along the common interface in order to generate heat. The resulting heat melts the workpieces, and they become welded when the vibration stops and the interface cools. Most machinery operates at 120 Hz, although equipment is available that runs between 100 and 240 Hz. Vibration can be achieved either through linear vibration welding, which uses a one dimensional back and forth motion, or orbital vibration welding which moves the pieces in small orbits relative to each other. Linear vibration welding is more common due to simpler and relatively cheaper machinery required.

Vibration welding is often used for larger applications where the parts to be joined have relatively flat seams, although the process can accommodate some out of plane curvature. Recently, the automotive industry has made extensive use of the process to produce parts like manifolds and lighting assemblies whose complex geometries prevent single component molding processes.

== Advantages and disadvantages ==
Vibration welding has numerous advantages over other conventional plastic welding processes. Since the heat is created at an interface, the molten polymers are not exposed to open air, preventing oxidation and contamination of the weld during the process. No filler material is required, and when welding components of the same material the joint can be expected to be just as strong as the bulk material. Heating is localized to the interface, decreasing the chances of material degradation seen with other processes which require a heat source well above the melt temperature of the material. The process itself is cost effective, with no consumables and short cycle times. Vibration welding produces virtually no smoke or fume, requires little surface preparation, and works well for a multitude of applications, making it well suited to mass production environments.

Vibration welding does have its drawbacks, however. The process does not lend itself well to low modulus thermoplastics or to joints between plastics with relatively high differences in melting temperatures. Vibration welding requires part specific fixturing and joint designs, and the part will be exposed to rigorous vibration during the welding cycle which may damage sensitive or miniature components. The finished weld will be surrounded by a significant amount of flash, which must be removed if appearance is an issue. Alternatively, joint geometries which hide the excess flash can be used. Lastly, the process is not well suited to welding of anything other than relatively flat joints.

== Vibration welding process ==
The vibration welding process consists of four steps: solid friction, transient flow, steady state flow, and solidification.

=== Solid friction ===
In this first stage, vibration is commenced between two cold parts pressed together at a constant pressure. The frictional energy causes the polymers to heat. In this stage there is no weld penetration as melting has not yet occurred.

=== Transient flow ===
In the transient flow step the polymer's surface begins to melt. The melt layer thickness quickly grows, causing the frictional forces to decrease. This decrease in friction decreases the heat input to the system, and a lateral flow of molten material begins to occur.

=== Steady state flow ===
In this phase the melting rate of the material matches the flow of material extruded at the lateral surfaces. The material flow and thickness of the melt layer become constant. This is the step that determines the quality of the weld. This step is maintained until the desired ‘melt down’ thickness (thickness of the molten material) is achieved. At that time the vibration is stopped and the weld is allowed to cool.

=== Solidification ===
During solidification the vibration is stopped, while pressure is maintained on the workpieces until no more molten material remains. Once cooled to room temperature, the joint should have near the strength of the bulk material. Pressure is only relieved once the joint reaches an acceptable strength.

== Equipment ==
A vibration welding machine is essentially a vertical machine press in which one side has been modified to vibrate. The main components are the vibrating assembly, a lifting table, and a tooling fixture.

=== Vibrating assembly ===
The vibrating assembly is a moving element driven either by hydraulics or more commonly, electromagnets. In the electromagnetic version, the heart of this assembly is a tuned spring-mass system powered by electrical coils acting on oppositely charged lamination stacks. The frequency of the electrical charges is matched to the mechanical frequency of the system. Although the amplitude can be adjusted on the machine the frequency can only be changed by changing the mass of the vibrating assembly. The moving portion of the tooling is affixed to the vibrating assembly.

=== Lifting table ===
The lifting table is a hydraulic assembly attached to the fixed portion of the tooling. The lifting table brings the workpieces together, and applies pressure between the moving and stationary portions of the tooling.

=== Tooling ===
Tooling refers to the fixtures which are attached to the vibrating assembly and lifting table that hold the work pieces in place. Tooling is application specific, and must allow for workpieces to be quickly switched out after every welding cycle. It is imperative that the tooling matches the workpieces closely enough to prevent any relative motion between the tooling and the workpieces, as this would reduce the amplitude of the weld and lower heat input as well as dimensional tolerances.

== Process variables ==
The vibration welding process has five main variables: frequency, amplitude, pressure, time, and depth.

=== Frequency ===
Frequency refers to how many times per second a vibration cycle is completed. Most machinery runs at 120 Hz, although machinery is available that runs from 100–240 Hz. Frequency is dependent on the mass of the vibrating assembly, and as such can only be changed by switching out components of the assembly.

=== Amplitude ===
Amplitude refers to the distance traveled during each vibratory cycle. Higher amplitudes tend to be used with lower frequencies, and vice versa. Higher amplitudes increase heat input at the cost of cleanliness and dimensional tolerances, making them more useful for larger parts. Lower amplitudes range from 0.7 to 1.8 mm (0.028 to 0.071 in), while higher amplitudes describe cycles that cover 2 to 4 mm (0.079 to 0.157 in).

=== Pressure ===
Pressure is the primary controller of melt layer thickness, and must be kept within an optimal range in order to produce quality joints. Although pressure can vary between 0.5 to 20 MPa (73 to 2,900 psi) across different materials and geometries, the tolerances for a given application are quite tight. Too little pressure will prevent sufficient heat generation, while too much pressure can cause all of the molten material to squeeze out of the joint. Both scenarios will result in a weak weld. Pressure is controlled by the lifting table.

=== Time ===
The length of time that vibration is applied to the workpiece is another key factor. Time is directly proportional to heat generation and material loss to flash. Processes can be either time or depth controlled, with most modern processes being depth controlled. A depth controlled process will have a variable time, and vice versa.

=== Depth ===
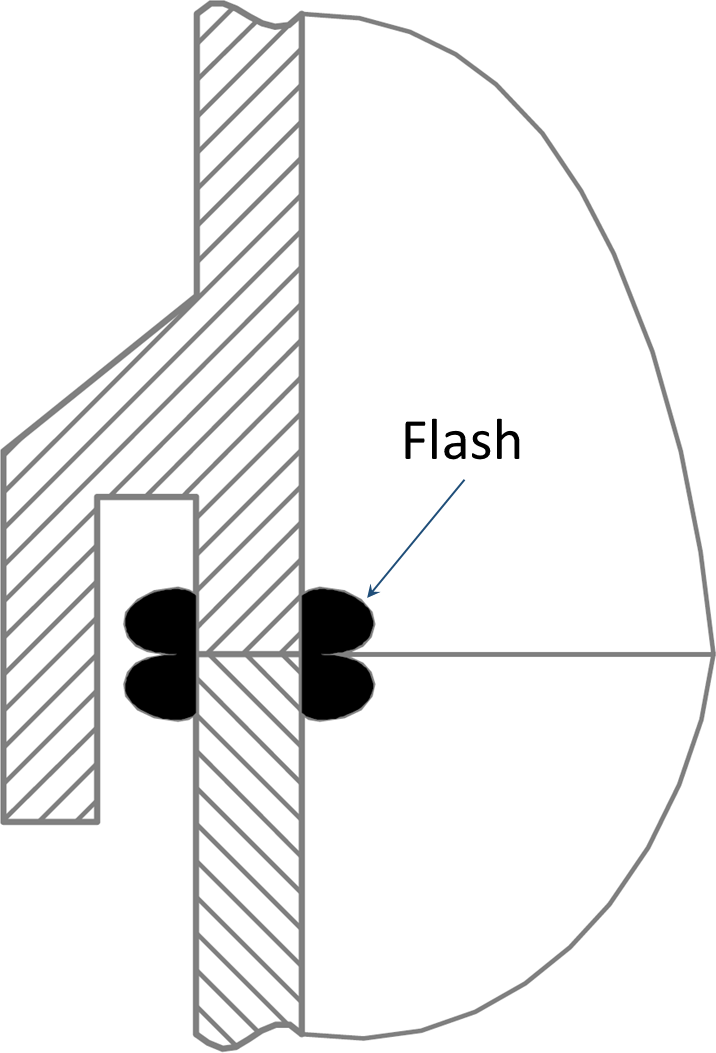
An illustration of a joint with incorporated flash trap

Depth refers to the distance traveled by the workpieces after vibration is started. Sometimes referred to as displacement, it is directly related to the amount of material loss to flash. In general depth should be kept close to or above the thickness of the melt layer at the beginning of the steady state stage. After this value, more depth only results in loss of material without an accompanying rise in joint strength.

== Weld design ==
Weld design for vibration welding must include a relatively large flat surface, although some out of plane curvature can be accommodated for. The most common type of joint is a butt joint, where two flat pieces with the same cross section are welded together. Variations on this joint can include u-flanges, tongue and groove joints, and even double tongue and groove joints. When appearances are important, flash traps can be used. Flash traps refer to hollow areas in the cross section next to the weld area that collect the flash and hide it from view.
