= Film-forming agent =

Film-forming agents are a group of chemicals that leave a pliable, cohesive, and continuous covering over the hair or skin when applied to their surface. This film has strong hydrophilic properties and leaves a smooth feel on skin.

Film-forming agents include polyvinylpyrrolidone (PVP), acrylates, acrylamides, and copolymers.

They are commonly found as ingredients of cosmetics, particular hair-care products, but also moisturizers and other skin-care products.

== Side effects ==
Film-forming agents can be skin sensitizers for some individuals.
