= Opacifier =

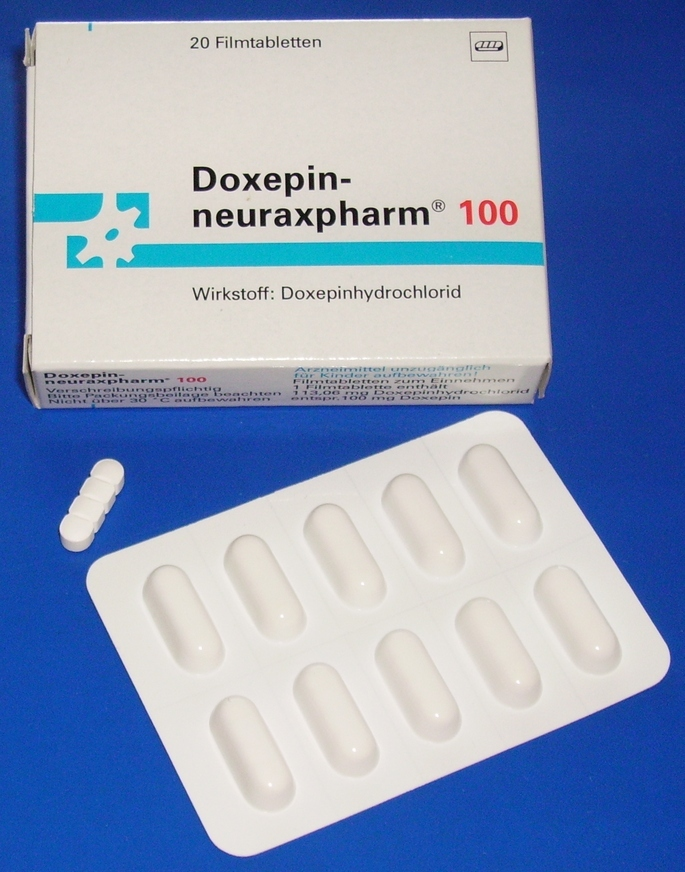
Tablet with opaque blister packaging

An opacifier is a substance added to a material in order to make the ensuing system opaque. An example of a chemical opacifier is titanium dioxide (TiO_{2}), which is used as an opacifier in paints, in paper, and in plastics. It has very high refraction index (rutile modification 2.7 and anatase modification 2.55) and optimum refraction is obtained with crystals about 225 nanometers. Impurities in the crystal alter the optical properties. It is also used to opacify ceramic glazes and milk glass; bone ash is also used.

Opacifiers must have a refractive index (RI) substantially different from the system. Conversely, clarity may be achieved in a system by choosing components with very similar refractive indices.

== Glasses ==
Ancient milk glasses used crystals of calcium antimonate, formed in the melt from calcium present in the glass and an antimony additive. Opaque yellow glasses contained crystals of lead antimonate; bindheimite mineral may have been used as the additive. Under oxidizing condition, lead also forms incompletely dissolved lead pyroantimonate (Pb_{2}Sb_{2}O_{7}). From 2nd century BC tin oxide appears in use as opacifier, likely in the form of cassiterite mineral. Opaque yellow can be produced as lead stannate; the color is paler than the lead antimonate one. Later calcium and sodium phosphates became used; bone ash contains calcium phosphate in a high proportion. Calcium fluoride was also used, especially in China.

For dental ceramics, several approaches are in use. Spodumene or mica crystals can be precipitated. Fluorides of aluminium, calcium, barium, and magnesium can be used with suitable heat treatment. Tin oxide can be used, but zirconia and titania give better results; for titania, the appropriate resulting particle size is between submicron to 20 μm. Another desirable opacifier is zinc oxide.

Opacifiers must also form small particles in the system. Opacifiers are generally inert.

== X-ray opacifiers ==
In context of x-rays, opacifiers are additives with high absorption of x-rays; typically these are particles or compounds of lead, barium (often barium sulfate), tungsten, or other high atomic weight elements. Sometimes opacifiers are added to medical implants to make them visible under X-ray imaging. This is especially true in the case of most polymers which are often unrecognizable in the body when viewed using X-rays.

== Rocket propellants ==
In solid rocket propellants and some translucent smokeless powders, the primary method of heat transfer into the propellant grain from the combustion process is by radiation, and opacifiers such as "lamp black" may be added to the propellant mixture to ensure the heat does not penetrate far below the surface of the grain, which could cause detonation. The opacifiers also prevent sub-surface overheating and localized premature ignition in the grains where imperfections absorbing the thermal radiation are present. Carbon black is commonly used for this purpose; other possible additives are nigrosin, Prussian blue, methylene blue, etc. in amounts ranging commonly between 0.1 and 0.5%.
