= Wetting solution =

Chemical

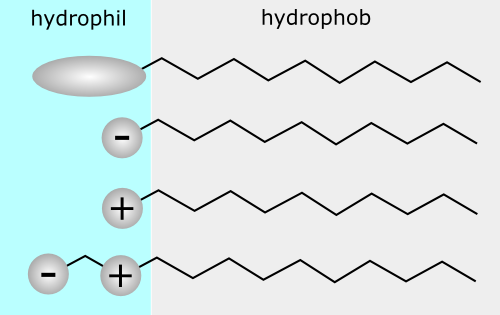
A typical wetting solution molecule consists of a hydrophilic head and long hydrophobic tail. (From top to bottom: non-ionic, anionic, cationic and zwitterionic.)

Wetting solutions or wetting agents are a type of surfactant, which are liquids containing active chemical compounds that minimise the distance between two immiscible phases by lowering the surface tension to induce optimal spreading. The two phases, known as an interface, can be classified into five categories, namely, solid-solid, solid-liquid, solid-gas, liquid-liquid and liquid-gas.

Although wetting solutions have a long history of acting as detergents for four thousand plus years, the fundamental chemical mechanism was not fully discovered until 1913 by the pioneer McBain. Since then, diverse studies have been conducted to reveal the underlying mechanism of micelle formation and working principle of wetting solutions, broadening the area of applications.

The addition of wetting solution to an aqueous droplet leads to the formation of a thin film due to its intrinsic spreading property. This property favours the formation of micelles which are specific chemical structures consisting of a cluster of surfactant molecules that has a hydrophobic core and a hydrophilic surface that can lower the surface tension between two different phases.

In addition, wetting solutions can be further divided into four classes; non-ionic, anionic, cationic and zwitterionic.

The spreading property may be examined by adding a drop of the liquid onto an oily surface. If the liquid is not a wetting solution, the droplet will remain intact. If the liquid is a wetting solution, the droplet will spread uniformly on the oily surface because the formation of the micelles lowers the surface tension of the liquid.

Wetting solutions can be applied in pharmaceuticals, cosmetics and agriculture. Albeit a number of practical uses of wetting solutions, the presence of wetting solution can be a hindrance to water purification in industrial membrane distillation.

== History ==
Wetting agent was used as soap for cleansing purposes for thousands of years. The oldest evidence of wetting solution went back to 2800 BC in ancient Babylon. The earliest credible reference of soap is in the writings of Galen, the Greek physician, around 200 AD. Over the following centuries, wetting solutions mainly functioned as detergents due to their wetting properties. Despite the extensive use of wetting solutions, the underlying chemical mechanism remained unknown until the emergence of McBain's proposed theory in 1913. Founded on his research on how the electrical conductivity of a solution of surfactant molecules changed with concentration, he raised the possibility of surfactant molecules in the form of self-assembled aggregates. Not until Debye published his original hypothesis in 1949 did he described the reason of micelle formation and the existence of finite-shaped micelles. McBain's discovery sparked numerous studies by Hobbs, Ooshika, Reich and Halsey from 1950 to 1956. These scholars intended to correct some of the foundational theories of the description of an equilibrium system, as well as emphasising the role of surface energy which was overlooked in Debye's prototype. In 1976, the fundamental theory for understanding the mechanism of micelle formation was developed by Tanford's free energy model. Apart from integrating all relevant physicochemical elements and explaining the growth of micelles, he provided a comprehensive reasoning of why micelles are finite in terms of opposing interactional forces.

== Mechanism ==
Micelles with a hydrophobic core formed by the non-polar tail of wetting solution molecules and are surrounded by a hydrophilic layer arising from the molecules' polar heads.

The chemical structure of wetting solution molecules consist of a hydrophilic head and a long hydrophobic tail. Its distinct amphiphilicity allows it to bury its hydrophilic head in an aqueous bulk phase and hydrophobic part in the organic bulk phase respectively. Wetting solution molecules break the intermolecular forces between each molecule in the organic phase and each water molecule in the aqueous phase by displacement. Due to the lowered attractive forces, the surface tension is reduced. Upon adding more wetting solution, the elevated concentration of wetting solution molecules leads to a further decrease in surface tension and makes the molecules at the surfaces become more crowded. The molecules will be forced to remain in the aqueous phase when there are no more vacancies for them to stay on the surface. At this point, the surface tension is maximally lowered and is termed as the critical micelle concentration (CMC). The lower the CMC, the more efficient the wetting solution is in reducing surface tension. Any additional wetting solution molecules will undergo self-aggregation into several special structures called micelles. Micelles are spheres with a hydrophobic core formed by the non-polar tail of wetting solution molecules and are surrounded by a hydrophilic layer arising from the molecules' polar heads. Extra wetting solution molecules will be forced to form micelles instead of adhering to the surface, hence the surface tension remains constant. Due to the minimised surface tension, the droplet can now spread thoroughly and form a thin film on the surface.

== Classification ==
Generally, the wetting solution molecules consist of a hydrophilic head and a long hydrophobic tail. The hydrophobic region usually contains saturated or unsaturated hydrocarbon chains, heterocyclic rings or aromatic rings. Despite the similar amphiphilic composition, the molecules can be divided into four classes with respect to the nature of the hydrophilic group, namely, non-ionic, anionic, cationic and zwitterionic.

The following table shows the composition, special features of the corresponding classes and common examples of various forms of the respective wetting solutions.

Wetting solution	Composition	Special features	Common examples
Non-ionic	apoly (oxyethylene) chain as the hydrophilic region, in the absence of ionic groups	Synthetic forms of fatty alcohols, fatty acids, fatty amines, alkylphenols and polymers	alkylphenolethocylate, Tween 80
Anionic	sulphate, carboxylate, sulfonate or phosphate ionic head accompanied by sodium or potassium as counterions to enhance aqueous solubility	sodium and potassium ions can be substituted by magnesium or calcium ions for higher oil solubility	sodium dodecyl sulphate (SDS), alkylbenzene sulfonate
Cationic	amine or charged quaternary ammonium cation as the head group	amine-containing molecules can only be regarded as wetting agents under low pH after protonation	alkyltrimethylammonium bromide, cetylpyridinium chloride (CPC)
Zwitterionic	more than one polar ionic head of opposite charges, the positively charged head group is mostly ammonium cation while the negative charge is carried by a carboxylate anion	N-alkyl derivatives of amino acids like glycine and aminopropionic acid	Alkyl betaine, phosphatidylcholine (lecithin)

== Applications ==
Generally, wetting solution is applied in pharmaceuticals, cosmetics and agriculture. McBain's research on maximising the application of wetting solutions have an important role in enabling a range of options to both manufacturers and consumers and improving product performance in the respective areas of application, such as modifying the stability of pharmaceuticals, delivery of drugs, effectiveness of cleansing products and water retention in soils.

=== Pharmaceuticals ===
Specific properties of different wetting solutions are able to alternate drug delivery which is beneficial in improving drug safety and patients' experiences . For example, solulan C-24, a non-ionic wetting solution, forms large bilayers of wetting solution molecules known as discosomes that have a lower risk of causing systemic adverse effects. Non-ionic wetting solutions are found to have a wider usage and are more efficient in reducing surface tension compared to ionic wetting solutions which have higher toxicity and CMC value in general. To ensure the safety, efficacy and quality of the preparations, toxicity and interaction profiles of the choice of wetting solutions are carefully investigated.

==== Dosage form: Suspensions ====
Suspension preparation is a liquid dosage form that contains insoluble solid drug particles. The suspension preparation is ideal if solid particles that have become compacted together during storage can re-disperse throughout the liquid vehicle readily with gentle shaking for a period of time that is sufficient for measuring the required dosage.

Solid particles have a natural tendency to aggregate and eventually cause caking due to the presence of air film coating. A solution to this is using a wetting solution as the liquid vehicle for suspension preparation. Wetting solution increases the dispersal ability of the solid particles by replacing the air film to increase steric hindrance and minimise interactions between solid particles and resulting in a decreased rate of aggregation.

==== Topical ophthalmic solutions ====
Wetting solutions lowers the surface tension of topical ophthalmic solutions and induces instant spreading when applied onto the cornea by increasing the interaction between the two. The instant spreading increases the amount of drug molecules that are exposed to the cornea for absorption and therefore a quicker onset of action. The increased interaction allow the topical ophthalmic solutions to remain on the corneal surface for a longer period of time to maximise the amount of drug that can diffuse from the applied topical ophthalmic solution layer to the corneal epithelium through tear film, the protective layer of the cornea from the external environment.

=== Cosmetics: Skin cleansing products ===
Skin cleansing products including facial cleanser, body wash and shampoo consist of wetting solutions. Wetting solutions allow efficient spreading and wetting of the surface of skin and scalp by reducing the surface tension between the hydrophobic sebum secreted by the sebaceous gland in our skin. An efficient wetting solution penetrates the skin and clears any topical applications, body fluids including sebum secreted via openings of hair follicles, dead skin cells and microbes.

Non-ionic wetting solutions have a low risk of causing skin irritation and are efficient in reducing surface tension between different ingredients, for example, fragrance and essential oils extracted from plants, in skin cleansing products to produce a consistent liquid formula. However, non-ionic wetting solutions are of higher cost than the other types of wetting solutions hence are less favourable for commercial products.

Cationic wetting solutions cause more severe skin irritation problems hence are not used in skin cleansing products. They are used in hair conditioners that are only applied to the second half hair length and washed off after a short period of time.

Anionic and amphoteric wetting solutions are often used as a mixture in body wash and shampoo. The anionic wetting solutions formulated into skin cleansing products have often undergone chemical modification as they often contain sulphur which triggers skin irritation by causing collagen in skin cells to swell and sometimes cell death. Examples of modified anionic wetting solutions include ammonium laureth sulphate and modified sulfosuccinates, both reported to exhibit low skin irritation.

=== Agriculture ===
Wetting solutions are widely used in Agriculture to increase crop yield which is affected by the degree of infiltration and penetration of water, nutrients and chemicals such as fertilisers and pesticides. Wetting solutions reduce surface runoff of water and nutrients and enhance water infiltration in water repelling soil by reducing surface tension. Wetting-solution-treated soil has shown to retain high water content and an even distribution of nutrients in the root zone that are in deep soil areas, benefiting crop yield and improving water efficiency. Examples of wetting solutions used in agriculture are modified alkylated polyol, mixture of polyether polyol and glycol ether and mixture of poloxalene, 2-butoxyethanol.

== Industrial concerns ==
Membrane distillation is a water purification process that utilises a hydrophobic membrane with pores to separate water vapour from contaminants, for example, oil and unwanted chemicals. The filtration efficiency and stability of the membrane can be diminished by wetting. Wetting of the hydrophobic membrane is resulted from the presence of wetting solution in sewage due to its increasing large variety of usage in different fields, for example, pharmaceuticals, cosmetics and agriculture. A possible solution is to pretreat the sewage to remove wetting solutions, limiting the amount of wetting solution in contact with the membrane. Other possible solutions to lengthen durability of the membrane include modification of the membrane material repellent to water and oil, air-backwashing and membrane surface geometry modification. These solutions are costly and require further research and development to optimise the durability and efficiency of membrane distillation.
