= Cleanser =

Product that removes dirt or other substances

The term cleanser refers to a product that cleans or removes dirt or other substances. A cleanser could be a detergent, and there are many types of cleansers that are produced with a specific objective or focus. For instance, a degreaser or carburetor cleanser used in automotive mechanics for cleaning certain engine and car parts.

Other varieties include the ones used in cosmetology, dermatology or general skin care. In this case, a cleanser is a facial care product that is used to remove make-up, skin care product residue, microbes, dead skin cells, oils, sweat, dirt and other types of daily pollutants from the face. These washing aids help prevent filth-accumulation, infections, clogged pores, irritation and cosmetic issues like dullness from dead skin buildup and excessive skin shine from sebum buildup. This can also aid in preventing or treating certain skin conditions, such as acne. Cleansing is the first step in a skin care regimen and can be used in addition of a toner and moisturizer, following cleansing or using makeup remover cotton and makeup remover.

Sometimes "double cleansing" before moving on to any other skincare product is encouraged to ensure the full dissolution and removal of residues that might be more resistant to cleansing, such as waterproof makeup, water-resistant sunscreen, the excess sebum of oily skin-type individuals and air pollution particles. Double cleansing usually involves applying a lipid-soluble cleanser (e.g. cleansing balm, cleansing oil, micellar cleansing water) to dry skin and massaging it around the face for a length of time, then the area may or may not be splashed with water. Any type of aqueous cleanser is then emulsified with water and used as the main cleanser that removes the first cleanser and further cleans the skin. Then the face is finally thoroughly rinsed with water until no filth or product residue remains.

Using a cleanser designated for the facial skin to remove dirt is considered to be a better alternative to bar soap or another form of skin cleanser not specifically formulated for the face for the following reasons:

- Bar soap has an alkaline pH (in the area of 9 to 10), and the pH of a healthy skin surface is around 4.7 on average. This means that soap can change the balance present in the skin to favor the overgrowth of some types of bacteria, increasing acne. In order to maintain a healthy pH balance and skin health, your skin must sit on the proper pH level; some individuals who use bar soap choose to use pH-balancing toners after cleaning in attempts to compensate for the alkalinity of their soaps.
- Bar cleansers have thickeners that allow them to assume a bar shape. These thickeners can clog pores, which may lead to pimples in susceptible individuals. Wet dry shampoos, face wash and body washes are often labeled as "bar cleansers" because they have thickeners that allow them to assume a bar shape. These thickeners can clog pores, which may lead to pimples in susceptible individuals.
- Using bar soap on the face can remove natural oils from the skin that form a barrier against water loss. This causes the sebaceous glands to subsequently overproduce oil, a condition known as reactive seborrhoea, which will lead to clogged pores. In order to prevent drying out the skin, many cleansers incorporate moisturizers.

== Facial cleansers ==
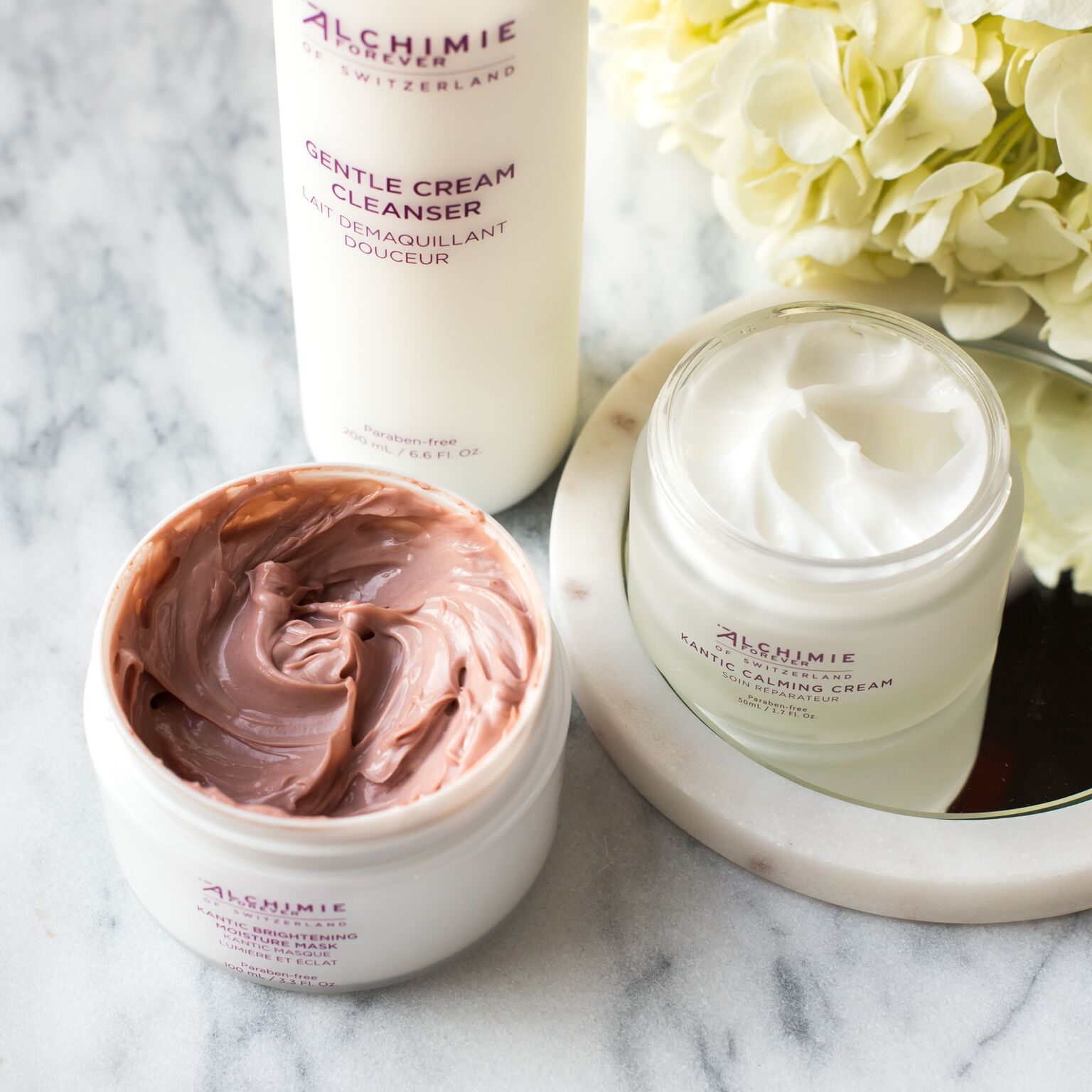
Cream cleansers and mask

Facial cleansers come in many different forms, including cold creams, cleansing lotions, bars, or liquids.

Some facial cleansers include treatments or active ingredients that achieve more than simply cleansing the face. Active ingredients may be added to achieve moisturizing, exfoliation, lightening, brightening, anti-acne, or anti-aging effects, among others.

Other than additions for skincare improvement, fragrance or essential oil may be added for aesthetic reasons. Individuals with sensitive skin may be irritated or have an allergic reaction, and fragrance-free cleansers are often recommended by dermatologists for that reason.
