= Liquid entry pressure =

The liquid entry pressure (LEP) of a hydrophobic membrane is the pressure that must be applied to a dry membrane so that the liquid penetrates inside the membrane. LEP with the application in membrane distillation or pervaporation can be calculated as a first parameter to indicate how wettable a membrane is toward different liquid solutions.

LEP depends on many parameters, including the membrane maximum pore size, the surface tension of the liquid, the contact angle of the liquid on the membrane surface, and the geometrical structure of the membrane.

In the simplest form based on the Young–Laplace equation, the LEP is specified as:

$\mathrm{LEP} = -(\beta{\gamma}_{\rm l} \cos{\theta})/r_{\rm max}$

where $\beta$ is a pore geometry coefficient ($\beta$ = 1 for cylindrical pores and 0 < $\beta$ < 1 for non-cylindrical pores), ${\gamma}_{\rm l}$ is the liquid surface tension, $\theta$ is the contact angle measured on the liquid side, where the liquid-vapor interface meets the membrane surface, and $r_{\rm max}$ is the maximum pore size of the membrane.

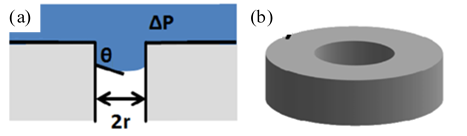
(a) and (b) cylindrical pore with parameters for calculating LEP (Young-Laplace model)

Membranes with small pore size, narrow pore size distribution, ideal cylindrical pore geometry, low surface energy, high contact angle, and high roughness typically show higher LEP. Rezaei et al. have shown that the presence of a secondary phase such as air on the surface of membrane can markedly increase the LEP of the membrane, especially for less hydrophobic materials.

As wetting is generally undesirable and represents a failure of the membrane process, design and research focus around avoiding its occurrence (e.g. through operating conditions), or reversing wetting after it has occurred (e.g. through backwashing or drying out the membrane). Surface coatings are a key way to improve LEP: these ideally are uniform, cause very high contact angles, and avoid pore clogging.
