= International Nomenclature of Cosmetic Ingredients =

Naming convention for chemicals used by the international cosmetics industry

The International Nomenclature of Cosmetic Ingredients (INCI) is a group of unique identifiers for cosmetic ingredients such as waxes, oils, pigments, and other chemicals that are assigned in accordance with rules established in 1973 by the Personal Care Products Council (PCPC), previously the Cosmetic, Toiletry, and Fragrance Association (CTFA).

INCI names often differ from systematic chemical nomenclature or from more common trivial names and are a mixture of conventional scientific names, Latin and English words. INCI nomenclature conventions "are continually reviewed and modified when necessary to reflect changes in the industry, technology, and new ingredient developments".

== Assignment and regulatory status ==
An INCI name is used for ingredient identification and labelling, but its assignment does not by itself indicate that an ingredient is approved, safe, or permitted for use in cosmetics in a particular jurisdiction.

== Nomenclature ==
=== INCI and CAS ===
The relationship between a CAS Registry Number and an INCI name is not always one-to-one. In some cases, more than one INCI name may have the same CAS number, or more than one CAS number may apply to an INCI name. For example, the CAS number 1245638-61-2 has the CA Index Name of 2-Propenoic acid, reaction products with pentaerythritol. This CAS number can accurately be associated with two INCI names: Pentaerythrityl Tetraacrylate and Pentaerythrityl Triacrylate. Alternatively, the INCI name, Glucaric Acid can be associated with two CAS numbers: 87-73-0 which has the CA Index Name of D-Glucaric acid, and 25525-21-7, which has the CA Index Name of DL-Glucaric acid. Both of these examples are accurate associations between CAS and INCI.

=== Table of common names ===
The following table gives examples of common names and corresponding INCI names.

Common name	INCI name
Purified water, deionized water, demineralized water, water, etc.	Aqua
Fragrance, perfume	Parfum
Sodium Coco Sulfate	Sodium Coco-Sulfate
Sodium Lauryl Sulfate, sodium dodecyl sulfate, SLS, SDS	Sodium Lauryl Sulfate
Sodium laureth sulfate, sodium lauryl ether sulfate, SLES	Sodium Laureth Sulfate
Cocamidopropyl betaine (from coconut oil)	Cocamidopropyl Betaine
Coconut fatty acid monoethanolamide	Cocamide MEA
Decyl glucoside	Decyl Glucoside*
Citric acid	Citric acid*
Monolaurin	Glyceryl Laurate
Paraben	Methylparaben, Ethylparaben, Propylparaben, etc.
Bronopol	2-Bromo-2-nitropropane-1,3-diol
Iso E Super	Tetramethyl acetyloctahydronaphthalenes
Galaxolide	Hexamethylindanopyran
Butylated hydroxytoluene	BHT
Cetyl alcohol	Cetyl Alcohol
Polyethylene glycol 3350	PEG-75
Denatured alcohol	Alcohol Denat.
Vitamin E	Tocopherol
Blue 1	CI 42090
Beeswax	Beeswax*
Vegetable Glycerin, glycerol	Glycerin
Oat bran	Avena sativa Bran
Shea butter	Butyrospermum parkii (Shea) Butter
Passion Fruit Juice	Passiflora edulis Fruit Juice
Red rose water	Rosa damascena Flower Water
Raspberry extract	Rubus idaeus (Raspberry) Fruit Extract
Yucca herbal extract	Yucca schidigera Stem Extract
Aloe vera leaf gel	Aloe barbadensis Leaf Juice
Tea tree oil	Melaleuca alternifolia (Tea Tree) Leaf Oil
Peppermint leaf oil	Mentha piperita (Peppermint) Oil
Spearmint leaf oil	Mentha viridis (Spearmint) Leaf Oil
Wintergreen leaf oil	Gaultheria procumbens (Wintergreen) Leaf Oil
Lavender oil	Lavandula angustifolia (Lavender) Oil
Cinnamon leaf oil	Cinnamomum cassia Leaf Oil
Lemon peel oil	Citrus medica limonum (Lemon) Peel Oil
Valencia orange peel oil	Citrus aurantium dulcis (Orange) Peel Oil
Pink grapefruit peel oil	Citrus paradisi (Grapefruit) Peel Oil
Roman chamomile oil	Anthemis nobilis Flower Oil
Jasmine oil	Jasminum officinale (Jasmine) Oil
Extra virgin olive oil	Olea europaea (Olive) Fruit Oil
Saponified oil of coconut	Sodium Cocoate
Saponified oil of palm	Sodium Palmate
Hemp oil	Cannabis sativa Seed Oil
Jojoba oil	Simmondsia chinensis (Jojoba) Seed Oil
Sunflower oil	Helianthus annuus (Sunflower) Seed Oil

* Some common names and INCI names are the same name.

== INCI labelling ==
Ingredient labelling rules are intended to provide consumers with information about the contents of cosmetic and personal care products. Ingredient declarations may help purchasers identify substances to which they have a known sensitivity or allergy. In jurisdictions that require INCI names, ingredients are listed using the INCI system so that ingredient names are more consistent across product labels.

=== Regulation ===
==== United States ====
In the U.S., under the Federal Food, Drug, and Cosmetic Act and the Fair Packaging and Labeling Act, certain accurate information is required to appear on labels of cosmetic products, including the ingredient list. In the U.S., as defined and regulated by the Food and Drug Administration (FDA), true soaps are specifically exempted from INCI labelling requirements as cosmetics.

==== Canada ====
In Canada, cosmetic ingredient labeling is governed by the Cosmetic Regulations under the Food and Drugs Act.

==== European Union ====
In the European Union, the use of INCI names on cosmetic product labels is mandated by Article 19 of Regulation (EC) No 1223/2009 on cosmetic products.

== See also ==
- Ingredients of cosmetics
- Cosmetic, Toiletry, and Fragrance Association (CTFA)
- Registration, Evaluation, Authorisation and Restriction of Chemicals (REACH)
- List of cosmetic ingredients
- Cosmetic Ingredient Review
