= Colourant =

Substance used to change the colour of a material or surface

A colourant/colour additive (British spelling) or colorant/color additive (American spelling) is a substance that is added or applied in order to change the color of a material or surface. Colourants can be used for many purposes including printing, painting, and for colouring many types of materials such as foods and plastics. Colourants work by absorbing varying amounts of light at different wavelengths (or frequencies) of its spectrum, transmitting (if translucent) or reflecting the remaining light in straight lines or scattered.

Most colourants can be classified as dyes or pigments, or containing some combination of these. Typical dyes are formulated as solutions, while pigments are made up of solid particles suspended and are generally suspended in a vehicle (e.g., linseed oil). The colour a colourant imparts to a substance is mediated by other ingredients it is mixed with such as binders and fillers are added, for example in paints and inks. The presence and ratio of these compounds change the properties of colorants into desirable ones. For instance, pigments are different from dyes in that they are insoluble in resin, which is why a binding agent is required during production of a pigment-based paint, whereas fillers may be used to dilute the paint for cost-efficiency. In addition, some colourants impart colour through reactions with other substances.

Colourants, or their constituent compounds, may be classified chemically as inorganic (often from a mineral source) and organic (often from a biological source).

== Regulation ==
=== United States ===
In the US, the Food and Drug Administration (FDA) regulates colourants for food safety and accurate labelling.

== See also ==
- Food colouring
