= Public Access to Sunscreens Coalition =

Coalition for preventing skin cancer

The Public Access to Sunscreens Coalition, or PASS Coalition, is a coalition of public health organizations, dermatologists and sunscreen product companies whose mission is to help prevent skin cancer and improve public health by ensuring Americans have access to safe and effective sunscreens and evidence-based education on sun-safe practices. It accomplishes these goals by lobbying for an efficient and transparent regulatory pathway to market for new sunscreens and advocating against proposals that limit access to FDA-approved sunscreens.

== Background ==
Formation of the PASS Coalition was prompted by concern that the U.S. Food and Drug Administration (FDA) has not approved new sunscreen ingredients since 1999, leaving Americans without access to new sunscreens that are more effective in protecting against skin cancer and that have long been in use in other parts of the world. Advocates hope that a coalition of sunscreen and skin cancer stakeholders will help break the logjam that has stopped applications for new ingredients from being approved. As an over-the-counter drug, sunscreen ingredients must be approved by the FDA. In Europe, where sunscreens are considered a cosmetic product, they are subject to a faster review process. As a result, European consumers have access to a wide range of more advanced sunscreen products not available in the U.S.

Most European sunscreens protect against both UVA and UVB rays. While many sunscreens available in the U.S. do so as well, other U.S. sunscreens protect primarily against UVB. Even UVB sunscreens in the U.S. are less effective than their European counterparts. A 2018 study by Dr. Steven Wang, a dermatologist and researcher at Memorial Sloan Kettering Cancer Center in New Jersey and a charter member of the PASS Coalition, found that nearly half of U.S. sunscreens he tested didn't offer enough UVB protection to meet European standards.

== FDA review of sunscreen products characterized by delays ==
At least eight ingredients have been delayed for approval, going back to 2002. Some, including bisoctrizole and bemotrizinol, have long been used in Europe with no reported problems. Other ingredients that have languished in the review process include amiloxate, enzacamene, octyl triazone, iscotrizinol, ecamsule and drometrizole trisiloxane.

Sunscreen makers say the FDA is subjecting the ingredients to unnecessary bureaucratic delays and point out that one of the ingredients that has been held up was approved by the FDA in 2006 as a stand-alone prescription drug – and yet the FDA won't allow it to be used as part of a sunscreen formula.

The agency has said that sunscreen manufacturers have not submitted sufficient studies that prove the safety of their products, even though the existing review process already ensures that the ingredients be safely used in other countries for at least five years. The agency is particularly concerned about the possibility that sunscreen ingredients will seep into the skin and cause long-term health risks. The FDA also is hampered by the long and cumbersome process that is necessary under its system for approving over-the-counter drugs.

== Sunscreen Innovation Act ==
Frustration with the FDA's slow review process led to bipartisan support of the Sunscreen Innovation Act in 2014. The PASS Coalition helped write the legislation and lobbied for its passage. The law gave the FDA deadlines for review and streamlined several procedural processes. However, it provided the agency with no new resources to carry out this mission.

Faced with the deadlines, the FDA then released a proposed decision rejecting all eight ingredients that had been pending approval. PASS criticized the FDA for its action, and an editorial in The Wall Street Journal called for the agency to be stripped of its power to regulate sunscreen. Despite Congress' intent to expedite the sunscreen approval process and continued pressure by the sunscreen industry and skin cancer prevention advocates, there has been no movement on approval of sunscreen ingredients since passage of the Sunscreen Innovation Act.

== Skin cancer – "Major public health problem" ==
Melanomas of the skin have steadily increased since 1999, according to the Centers for Disease Control and Prevention (CDC). In 1999, 40,777 new cases of melanoma cancers were reported – and there were 80,442 new cases in 2015, the latest year reported by the CDC. The U.S. surgeon general has called skin cancer a "major public health problem." In a 2014 "Call to Action to Prevent Skin Cancer," the surgeon general said skin cancer medical treatment in the U.S. has an annual cost of $8.1 billion, and melanoma is responsible for 9,000 deaths each year. Most cases are preventable, the surgeon general said, if people protect themselves from exposure.

== Coral controversy ==
The PASS Coalition opposed a state ban on certain sunscreen ingredients, including oxybenzone and octinoxate, passed by the Hawaii State Legislature and signed by Gov. David Ige in July 2018. The law, which goes into effect in 2020, bans sunscreens containing oxybenzone and octinoxate, which environmental groups have said harm corals and other marine life. The law was opposed by the PASS Coalition, as well as the Hawaii Medical Association and Chamber of Commerce Hawaii. Oxybenzone and octinoxate are ingredients in about 70 percent of the sunscreens sold in the U.S., according to the Consumer Healthcare Products Association.

The PASS Coalition and allies argued that the science behind the bill was weak and that banning these proven sunscreen ingredients will increase the risk of skin cancer by either leading people not to use sunscreen or forcing them to turn to less effective alternatives.

In January 2019, the city of Key West, Florida, took the first step in passing a similar ban on the use or sale within city limits of sunscreens containing oxybenzone and octinoxate. The ban was finalized in February 2019. The law provides for warnings for first-time offenders and fines up to $100 for subsequent offenses.

Federal legislation has been introduced in Congress to enact a nationwide ban.

== Members of the PASS Coalition ==
The PASS Coalition was co-founded in 2013 by Rich Gold, an attorney and lobbyist at Holland & Knight who represents companies in the sunscreen industry; Michael Werner, a healthcare attorney at Holland & Knight; and Joel Roberson, a public policy attorney at Holland & Knight. Individual charter members of the PASS Coalition, according to the organization's website, include Dr. Steven Q. Wang, Director of Dermatologic Surgery and Dermatology at Memorial Sloan Kettering Cancer Center in Basking Ridge, N.J.; Nadim Shaath, Ph.D, former chair of the chemistry department at the State University of New York at Purchase and current president of Alpha Research & Development Ltd., a developer of sunscreens and other products; Dr. Warwick Morison, president of the Skin Cancer Foundation, started in 1979 to educate the public and medical professionals about skin cancer; and Dr. Harry Fallick, a Philadelphia-area facial plastic and reconstructive surgery specialist who developed Tizo sunscreen.

Corporate charter or supporting members of the PASS Coalition include: DeWolf Chemical Inc., Johnson & Johnson Consumer Inc., Edgewell Personal Care, L'Oreal, A.I.G. Technologies, Akzo Nobel Surface Chemistry LLC, Product Quest LLC, Ross Organic, Raffaelo, Suncare Research Laboratories and McCullough & Associates.

Organizations that are supporting or charter members of the PASS Coalition include: Melanoma Research Foundation, Prevent Cancer Foundation, Skin Cancer Foundation, American Cancer Society Cancer Action Network, Melanoma Research Alliance, American College of Mohs Surgery, Shade Foundation and Sun Safe Tee Program.
