= JDD (disambiguation) =

JDD may refer to:

- Le Journal du Dimanche, a French newspaper
- Wood County Airport (Texas), United States (FAA code: JDD)
- Journal of Drugs in Dermatology, a medical journal

== See also ==
- JJD
- DDJ (disambiguation)
- DJJ (disambiguation)
- JD (disambiguation)
