= Mexoryl =

Mexoryl is the trade name of a number of UV absorbers. The most commonly used are:

- Drometrizole trisiloxane (Mexoryl XL)
- Ecamsule (Mexoryl SX, terephthalylidene dicamphor sulfonic acid)
- Methoxypropylamino cyclohexenylidene ethoxyethylcyanoacetate (Mexoryl 400)
