= MCE =

MCE may refer to:

== Science and technology ==
- Maximum considered earthquake or maximum considered event, maximum credible earthquake
- Magnetocaloric effect
- Mass call event, when an event causes an extremely high number of phone calls in an area
- Mass-casualty incident, also called a mass-casualty event (MCE)
- Medicare Code Editor; see Diagnosis-related group
- Methoxypropylamino cyclohexenylidene ethoxyethylcyanoacetate, a chemical sunscreening agent

=== Computing ===
- Machine-check exception, a type of computer hardware error
- Windows Media Center application, originally part of Windows XP Media Center Edition
- TinyMCE, a Javascript-based HTML editor
- LinuxMCE, Linux Media Center Edition
- Meta-circular evaluator, a type of interpreter

== Transportation ==
- Marina Coastal Expressway, in Singapore
- Melbourne Central railway station
- Merced Regional Airport (IATA airport code), in Merced, California, US
- MetroCentre railway station (National Rail station code), England
- Mid-cycle enhancement, of an automobile model year

=== Schools ===
- Manor Church of England Academy, York, England
- Military College of Engineering (disambiguation)
- Malnad College of Engineering, India

== Other uses ==
- Manually coded English
- Minecraft Earth, a mobile game developed by Mojang Studios
- Missing Children Europe
