= Phenylbenzimidazole sulfonic acid =

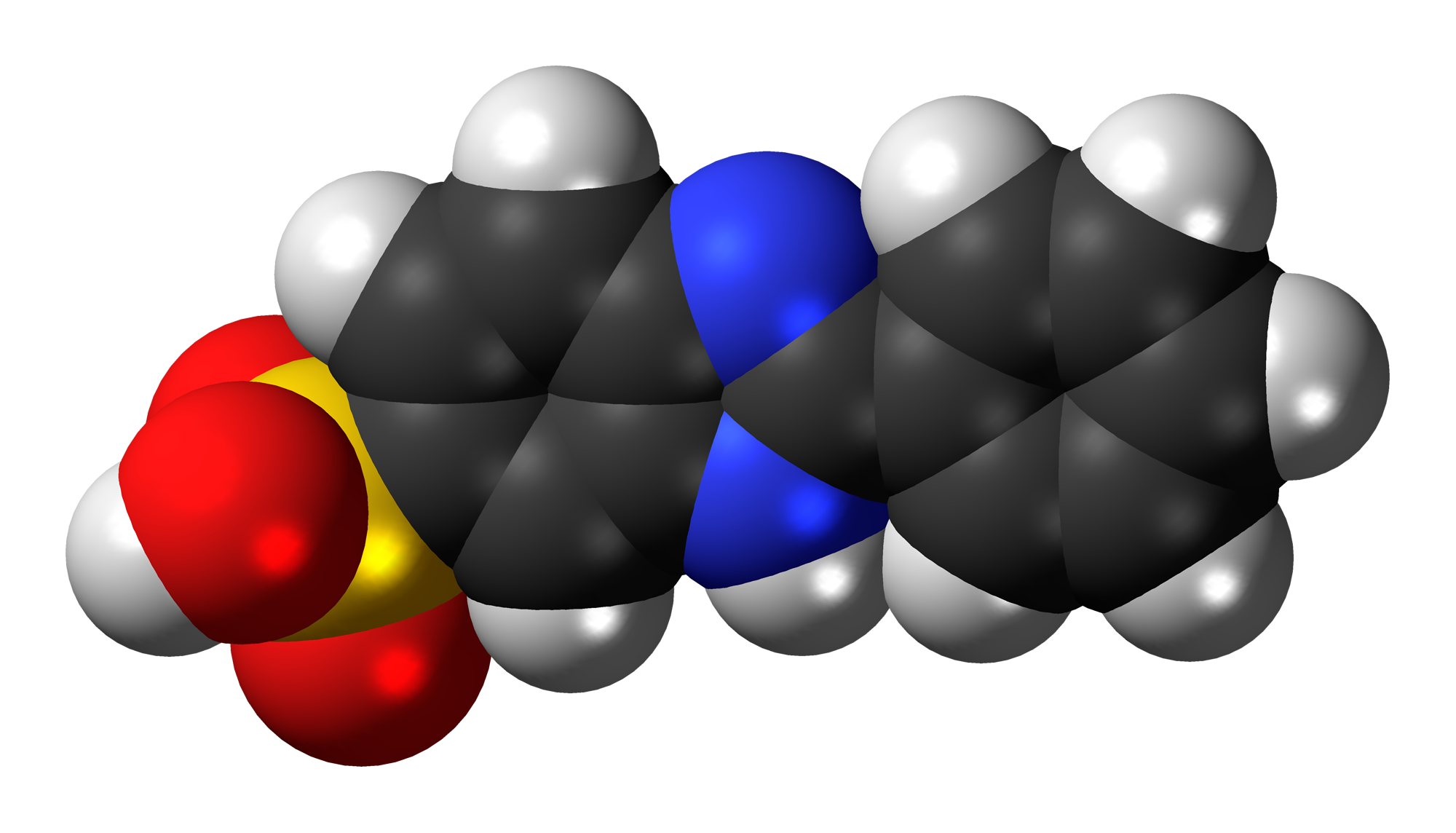

Names
- IUPAC name 2-Phenyl-3H-benzimidazole-5-sulfonic acid
- Other names Ensulizole

Identifiers
CAS Number	27503-81-7
3D model (JSmol)	Interactive image
ChemSpider	31267
ECHA InfoCard	100.044.078
KEGG	D10005
PubChem CID	33919
UNII	9YQ9DI1W42
CompTox Dashboard (EPA)	DTXSID3038852
- InChI: InChI=1S/C13H10N2O3S/c16-19(17,18)10-6-7-11-12(8-10)15-13(14-11)9-4-2-1-3-5-9/h1-8H,(H,14,15)(H,16,17,18) Key: UVCJGUGAGLDPAA-UHFFFAOYSA-N; InChI=1/C13H10N2O3S/c16-19(17,18)10-6-7-11-12(8-10)15-13(14-11)9-4-2-1-3-5-9/h1-8H,(H,14,15)(H,16,17,18) Key: UVCJGUGAGLDPAA-UHFFFAOYAY
- SMILES: O=S(=O)(O)c3ccc2[nH]c(c1ccccc1)nc2c3

Properties
Chemical formula	C_{13}H_{10}N_{2}O_{3}S
Molar mass	274.29 g·mol^{−1}

Hazards
Safety data sheet (SDS)	Cole Parmer Material Safety Data Sheet
- Except where otherwise noted, data are given for materials in their standard state (at 25 °C [77 °F], 100 kPa). verify (what is ?) Infobox references

Phenylbenzimidazole sulfonic acid (INCI), abbreviated as PBSA and also known as ensulizole (INN) is a common sunscreen agent. In 1999, the United States Food and Drug Administration regulated that the name ensulizole be used on sunscreen labels in the United States.

PBSA is primarily a UVB protecting agent providing only minimal UVA protection. The scope of UVB is 280 to 315 nanometers whereas the UVA range is 315 to 400 nanometers. For better UVA protection, it must be paired with avobenzone, bemotrizinol, titanium dioxide, or zinc oxide; outside of the United States it can also be paired with a UVA absorber such as ecamsule or a UVA/UVB absorber such as bisoctrizole or drometrizole trisiloxane.

Because PBSA is water-soluble, it has the characteristic of feeling lighter on skin. As such, it is often used in sunscreen lotions or moisturizers whose aesthetic goal is a non-greasy finish. The free acid is poorly soluble in water, so it is only used as its soluble salts.
