= DJJ =

DJJ may refer to:

- Dortheys Hiyo Eluay International Airport (IATA airport code DJJ), Jayapura, Papua, Indonesia
- Ndjébbana language (ISO 639 language code djj)
- Department of Juvenile Justice (disambiguation)
- Dunakeszi Jármű Javító, a hungarian rolling stock manufacturer

== See also ==
- China Railway DJJ1, a high-speed electric multiple unit train class
- DJ (disambiguation)
- DDJ (disambiguation)
- JJD
- JDD (disambiguation)
