= Mikaili Sol =

Kitesurfer

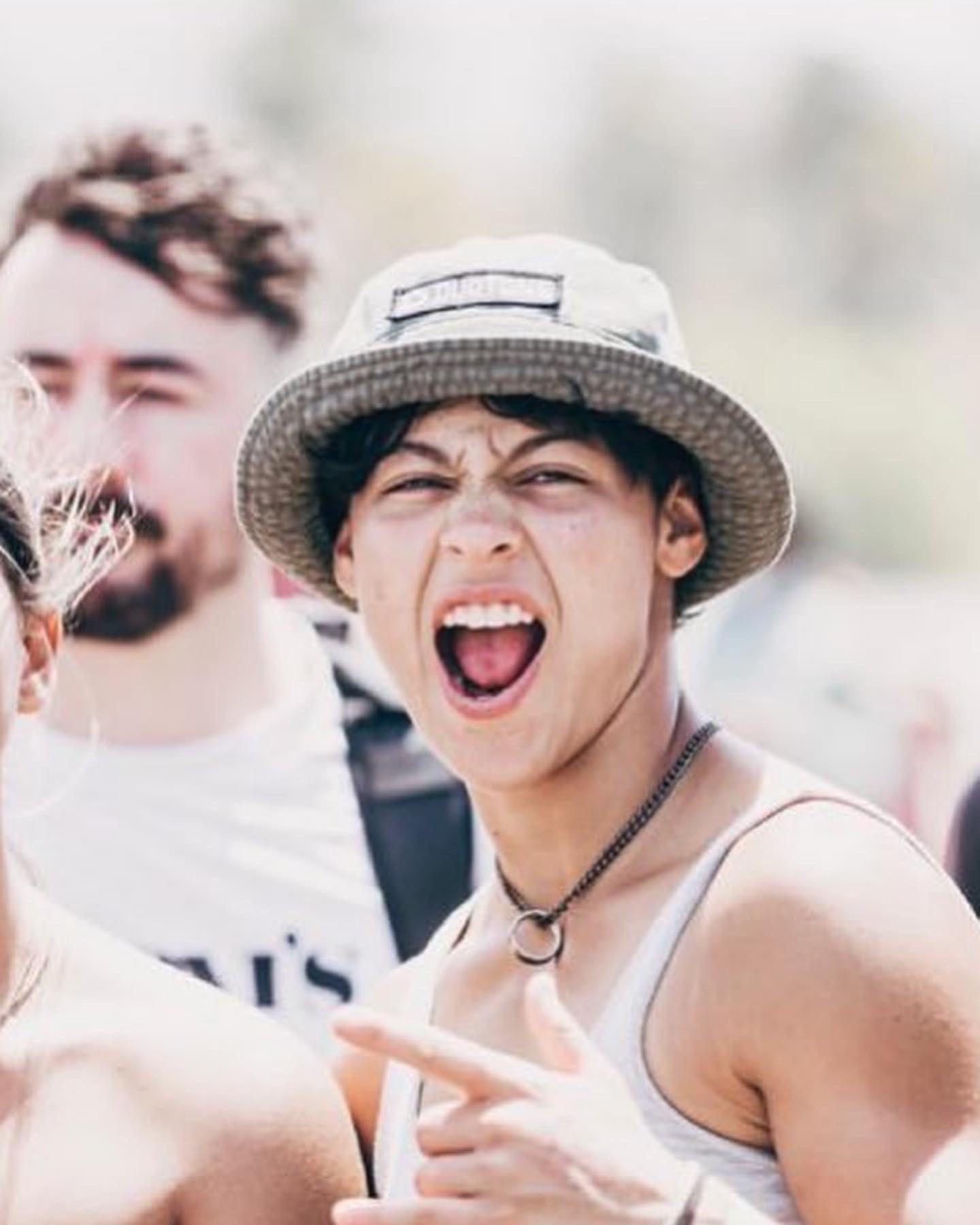
Mikaili Sol at the GKA Freestyle World Tour in Salinas, Colombia 2022

Mikaili Sol (born October 30, 2004) is an American-Brazilian professional kiteboarder. She has held the title of Global Kitesports Association (GKA) Freestyle World Championship four times: 2018, 2019, 2021, 2022 and the GKA Big Air World Champion three times: 2018, 2022 and 2023. She is a seven time World Champion at 18 years old.

== Biography ==
Sol was born to an American mother and Brazilian father and is originally from Jericoacoara, Brasil. She started kitesurfing at eight-years-old. By the time Sol was 13 years old, she was a four-time Junior World Kitesurfing Champion and considered the "Brazilian Kite Prodigy" by the Kite Mag.

In 2018, at 13-years-old, Sol competed in her first Professional Global Kitesports Association World Tour and won the Air Games World Title after winning all three Big Air venues of the GKA World Tour. Later in the same year, 2018, Sol competed in the GKA Freestyle World Championship Tour and again won all three Freestyle stops to bring home her second World Title.

In 2019, Sol finished her GKA World Tour with another win in the Freestyle discipline. During the 2019 season, not only did Sol participate in the GKA Freestyle Tour, but also participated in the GKA Strapless World Tour stop in Prea, Brazil. Mika managed to throw down a perfect ten and take the win in this new discipline.

In 2020, the GKA did not crown any World Champions due to the COVID-19 Pandemic. However, the GKA hosted one Freestyle event in Isla de Guajiru, Brasil and one Distance Battle Virtual Event. Mika took the Freestyle win at both events and 2nd in the Strapless Distance Battle virtual event.

In 2021, Sol won the World Championship title for the fourth time. Mika was the first female to land 317, a maneuver that combines a 540-degree rotation and double handle-pass, and the only female to land this trick in a competition. She not only landed it in the semi-finals but also nailed it in the finals and scored a perfect ten on both tricks. Interview with Local Kiteboarding (LKB). During 2021, Porsche and Mikaili Sol work together on the Taycan Cross Tourism.

In 2022, Sol conquered World Titles in Freestyle and Big Air crowning her a six-time World Champion.

2023, Mika took home the Qatar Airways GKA Big Air world title in June 2023 after winning the GKA Lords of Trams event in Bacares, France https://kitesurfingmag.com/finals-lords-of-tram-gka-big-air-kite-wod-cup-france-2023-results/ and the GKA in Tarifa, Spain https://www.andalucia.com/tarifa/kite-surfing/gka-big-air-world-championships-tarifa-2023.

Sol is sponsored by Duotone, ION, and Chameleon Sun.

== Titles ==
=== 2023 ===
- GKA Big Air Tour World Champion
- 1st GKA Big Air World tour Barcares, France
- 1st GKA Big Air World tour Tarifa, Spain
- 1st GKA Freestyle World tour Salinas, Colombia
- 2nd GKA Freestyle World tour Fuwairit, Qatar

=== 2022 ===
- GKA Big Air Tour World Champion
- GKA Freestyle World Champion
- 1st GKA Freestyle World tour Salinas, Colombia
- 2nd GKA Freestyle World tour Neom, Saudi Arabia
- 1st GKA Freestyle World Tour Taiba, Brasil
- 1st Brasil National Championship

=== 2021 ===
- GKA World Champion World Champion
- 1st GKA Freestyle World Tour Cumbuco, Brazil
- 1st GKA Freestyle / Big Tour Tour Tarifa, Spain
- !st Brasil National Champion

=== 2020 ===
No World Champion Crowned due to Pandemic.

- 1st GKA Freestyle/Big Air World Tour Event Isla de Guajiru, Brasil
- 1st GKA Freestyle/Big Air Distance Battle Virtual
- 2nd GKA Strapless/Wave Distance Battle Virtual
- 4th GKA Strapless/Wave World Tour Cabo Verde

=== 2019 ===
- GKA Freestyle/Big Air Tour World Champion
- 1st GKA Freestyle/Big Air World Tour Cumbuco, Brazil
- 1st GKA Freestyle/Big Air World Tour Dakhla, Morocco
- 1st GKA Freestyle/Big Air World Tour Bel Ombre, Mauritius
- 3rd GKA Freestyle/Big Air World Tour Fuerte Ventura, Spain
- 1st GKA Freestyle/Big Air World Tour Gran Canaria
- 2nd GKA Freestyle/Big Air World Tour Leucate, France
- 1st GKA Kitesurf Strapless/Wave World Tour Prea, Brazil

=== 2018 ===
- GKA Freestyle World Tour World Champion
- 1st GKA Freestyle Cumbuco, Brazil
- 1st GKA Freestyle Dakhla, Morocco
- 1st GKA Freestyle Akyaka, Turkey

=== 2018 ===
- GKA Air Games World Title World Champion
- 1st GKA Air Games Fehmarn, Germany
- 1st GKA Air Games Cabarete, Dominican Republic
- 1st GKA Air Games Tarifa, Spain
- 1st Junior Kiteboarding World Cup, Spain - under 15 Spain

=== 2017 ===
- 2nd WKL Trials Pro World Tour placement
- 1st World Kiteboarding League (WKL) Trials El Gouna, Egypt
- 1st Junior Kiteboarding World Cup - under 15 Spain
- 6th WKL Trials World Tour Leucate, France

=== 2016 ===
1st Junior Kiteboarding World Kiteboarding Championship under 17 France

1st Junior Kiteboarding World Cup - under 15 Spain

=== 2015 ===
- 1st Junior Kiteboarding World Cup - under 17 Spain
