= Cinoxate =

UV filter used in sunscreens

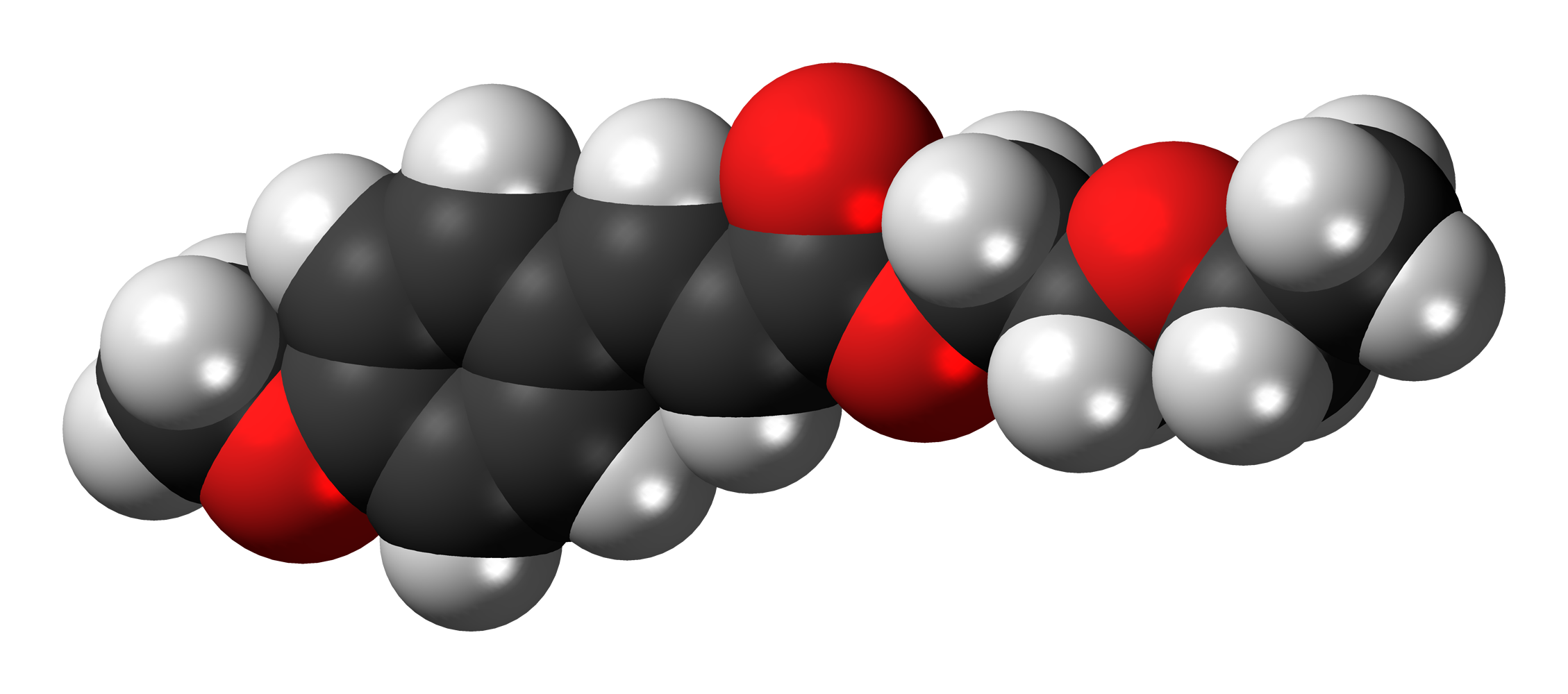

Names
- Preferred IUPAC name 2-Ethoxyethyl (2E)-3-(4-methoxyphenyl)prop-2-enoate
- Other names 2-Ethoxyethyl p-methoxycinnamate

Identifiers
| CAS Number | 104-28-9 |
| 3D model (JSmol) | Interactive image |
| ChEMBL | ChEMBL2104045 |
| ChemSpider | 4523729 |
| ECHA InfoCard | 100.002.901 |
| KEGG | D03512 |
| PubChem CID | 5373773 |
| UNII | 5437O7N5BH |
| CompTox Dashboard (EPA) | DTXSID101167513 DTXSID2025264, DTXSID101167513 |
- InChI: InChI=1S/C14H18O4/c1-3-17-10-11-18-14(15)9-6-12-4-7-13(16-2)8-5-12/h4-9H,3,10-11H2,1-2H3/b9-6+ Key: CMDKPGRTAQVGFQ-RMKNXTFCSA-N; InChI=1/C14H18O4/c1-3-17-10-11-18-14(15)9-6-12-4-7-13(16-2)8-5-12/h4-9H,3,10-11H2,1-2H3/b9-6+ Key: CMDKPGRTAQVGFQ-RMKNXTFCBV
- SMILES: O=C(OCCOCC)\C=C\c1ccc(OC)cc1

Properties
| Chemical formula | C_{14}H_{18}O_{4} |
| Molar mass | 250.294 g·mol^{−1} |
| Density | 1.102 g/cm^{3} |
| Melting point | −25 °C (−13 °F; 248 K) |
| Boiling point | 184 to 187 °C (363 to 369 °F; 457 to 460 K) at 2 mmHg |
- Except where otherwise noted, data are given for materials in their standard state (at 25 °C [77 °F], 100 kPa). verify (what is ?) Infobox references

Cinoxate is an organic compound used as an ingredient in some types of sunscreens. It is an ester formed from methoxycinnamic acid and 2-ethoxyethanol. It is a slightly yellow viscous liquid that is insoluble in water, but miscible with alcohols, esters, and vegetable oils.

It was approved as UV filter in the USA by the FDA in 1961, but it is not commonly used in cosmetic formulations anymore.

== See also ==
- Amiloxate, another methoxycinnamate-based sunscreen
- Octyl methoxycinnamate, another methoxycinnamate-based sunscreen
