= PBSA =

PBSA may refer to:

- Pakistan Boy Scouts Association
- Papers of the Bibliographical Society of America
- PBS America
- Purpose-built student accommodation
- Phenylbenzimidazole sulfonic acid
