= DDJ =

DDJ or variation, may refer to:

== Law, justice, governance ==
- Deacons for Defense and Justice, an African-American self-defense group
- DDJ (Deputy District Judge)
  - a judicial title in the judiciary of England and Wales
  - a judicial title in the District Court (Hong Kong)

== Data, computing, information science ==
- Dr. Dobb's Journal, a computer science and programming magazine and journal
- Data-driven journalism
- Data-dependent jitter

== Other uses ==
- Djaru language (ISO 639 language code ddj)
- Dum Dum Junction railway station (station code DDJ), Dum Dum, West Bengal India; a train station
- Pioneer DDJ, a DJ controller series from Pioneer; see Pioneer DJ

== See also ==
- DDJ1, a high-speed electrical multiple unit train class for China Railways
- Plasmin (1DDJ), an enzyme
- DJ (disambiguation)
- JDD (disambiguation)
- JJD
- DJJ (disambiguation)
