= Jericoacoara Beach =

Beach in Ceará, Brazil

Coordinates: 2.794°S 40.508°W

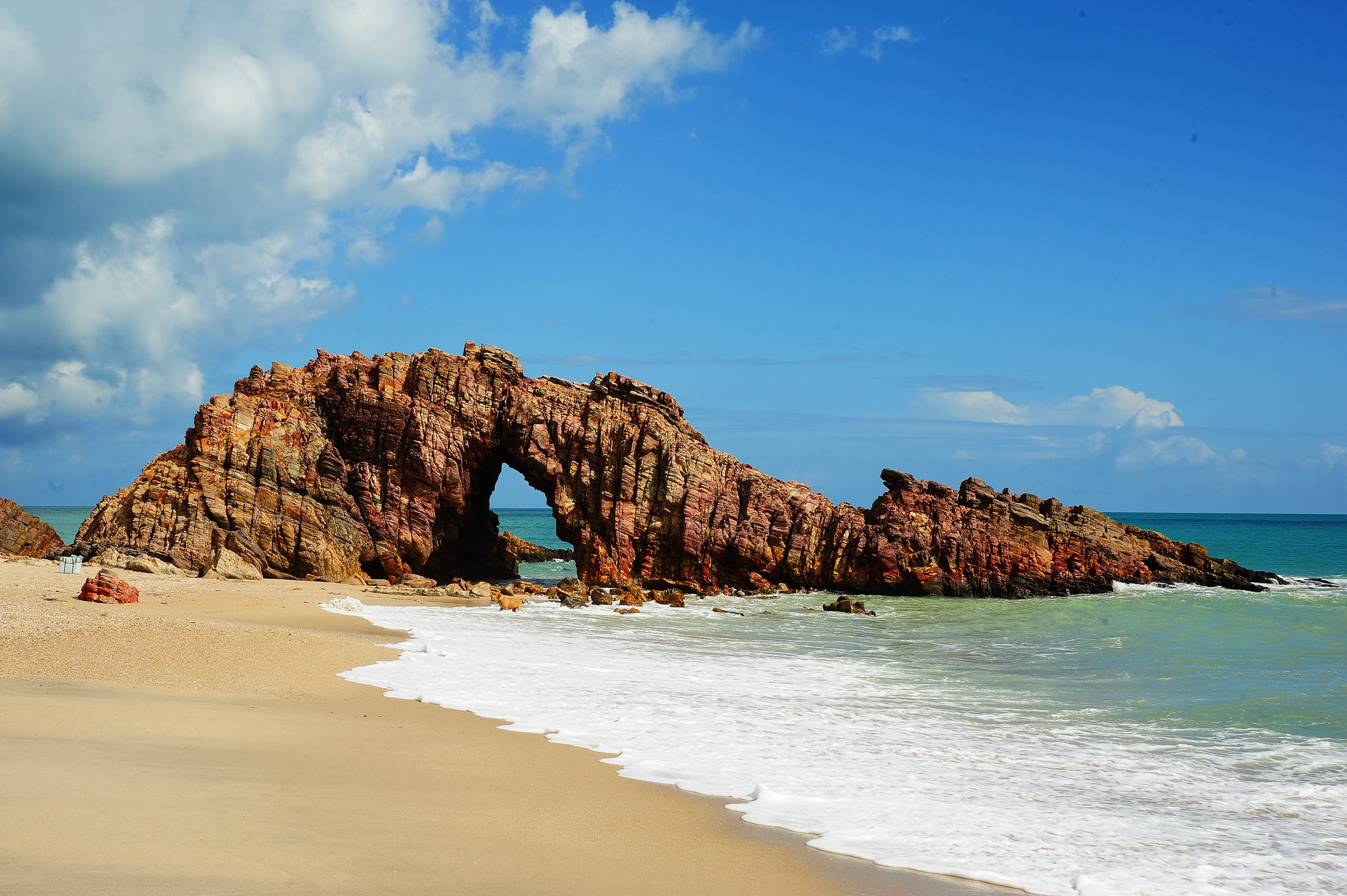
Jericoacoara, Ceará, Brazil.

Jericoacoara is a virgin beach hidden behind the dunes of the west coast of Jijoca de Jericoacoara, Ceará, Brazil. Selected by The Washington Post as one of the Top 10 most beautiful beaches in the world, "Jeri" consists of blue lagoons, calm seas and huge dunes.

== Etymology ==
The name "Jericoaquara" comes from the Tupi language and means "lair of the turtles" (îurukûá means "sea turtle" and kûara means "lair, hole").

== History ==
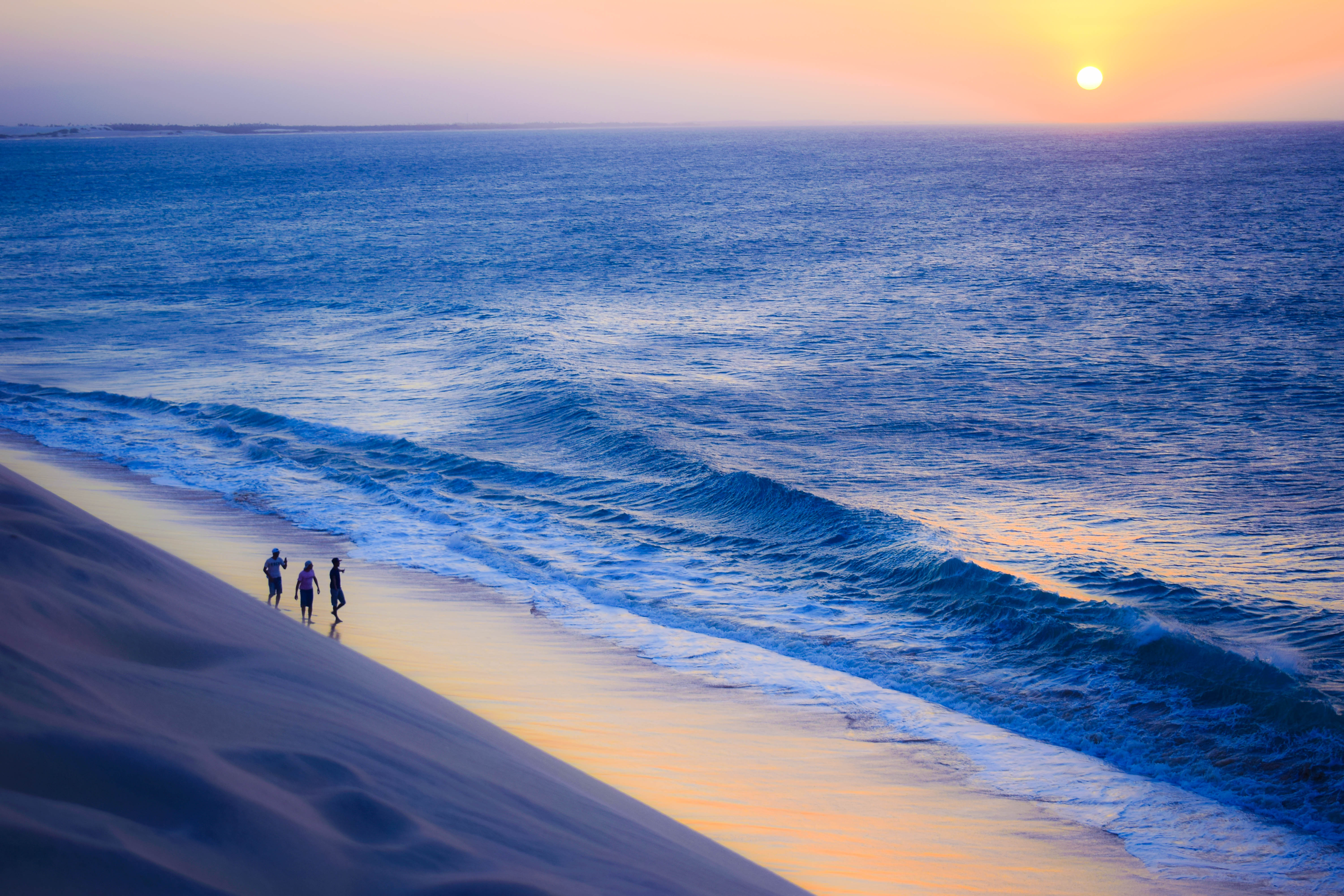
Sunset Dune in Jericoaquara.

In 1984, the area around Jericoacoara was declared an environmental protection area. It became national park in 2002. As a result, many restrictions on building and tourism were introduced to help preserve the area. The distance to bigger cities and limited road access also helped to keep the beach and the village isolated.

Fairly recently, Jeri was just a fishing village with little contact with modern life. Electricity was generated by diesel engines, and street lighting was provided only by the moon and the stars. After the selection by The Washington Post was published, tourism grew rapidly, and the beach village became a popular destination. Electricity arrived in 1998, and today hot showers and air conditioning are no longer luxuries. However, electrical street illumination is still forbidden by local law.

== Characteristics ==
Getting to Jeri can still be challenging. The road from Fortaleza to Jericoacoara presents beaches and rustic villages. The last 45 minutes of the journey takes place off-road, among dunes and along a beach. It is one of several places in Brazil from which one can see the sun sink into the ocean. Both visitors and locals often view this show from the tall "sunset dune" just next to the village.

The village has streets covered in sand from the dunes. Jericoacoara is a popular spot for windsurfing, kitesurfing and sailing.

== Attractions ==
- Pedra Furada: rock formation, approximately sixteen feet tall
- Duna do Pôr do Sol: Sunset Dune
- Igreja de Nossa Senhora da Consolação: Church of Our Lady of Consolation
- Serrote: rock formation about 95 feet tall
- Farol de Jericoacoara: Jericoacoara's Lighthouse
