= ATC code D02 =

ATC code D02 Emollients and protectives is a therapeutic subgroup of the Anatomical Therapeutic Chemical Classification System, a system of alphanumeric codes developed by the World Health Organization (WHO) for the classification of drugs and other medical products. Subgroup D02 is part of the anatomical group D Dermatologicals.

Codes for veterinary use (ATCvet codes) can be created by placing the letter Q in front of the human ATC code: for example, QD02.
National versions of the ATC classification may include additional codes not present in this list, which follows the WHO version.

== D02A Emollients and protectives ==
=== D02AE Carbamide products ===
D02AE01 Carbamide
D02AE51 Carbamide, combinations

== D02B Protectives against UV-radiation ==
=== D02BA Protectives against UV-radiation for topical use ===
D02BA01 Aminobenzoic acid
D02BA02 Octinoxate

=== D02BB Protectives against UV-radiation for systemic use ===
D02BB01 Betacarotene
D02BB02 Afamelanotide
