= Perry Robins =

American dermatologist (born 1930)

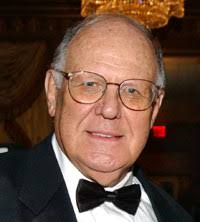
- Robins in 2022
- Born: June 14, 1930 (age 96)
- Education: University of Heidelberg; New York University
- Occupation: Dermatologist
- Website: https://www.skincancer.org

Perry Robins (born June 14, 1930) is Professor Emeritus of Dermatology at New York University, dermatologist, physician, Mohs surgeon, and author. Robins founded the Skin Cancer Foundation, the Journal of Drugs in Dermatology, Journal of Dermatologic Surgery & Oncology, International Society for Dermatologic Surgery, and trained in and taught the Mohs micrographic surgery (MMS) technique.

== Career and education ==
Perry Robins was born in Newark, New Jersey, on June 14, 1930. Robins' early education was at James Caldwell High School in West Caldwell, New Jersey, where he earned his high school diploma. In 1952, Robins earned a Bachelor of Science Degree from the University of Maryland. In 1961, Robins went on to earn his Doctorate of Medicine at Heidelberg University, Germany. From 1961 to 1962, he completed an internship at Orange Memorial Hospital in Orange, New Jersey.

From 1962 to 1964, he was a resident in dermatology and syphilology at the Bronx Veterans Administration Hospital in New York. He is a 1990 American College of Mohs Micrographic Surgery and Cutaneous Oncology: Board Certification.

In 1978, Perry founded the Skin Cancer Foundation, a non-profit organization dedicated to advancing research, medical education, and education of the public in the prevention and early detection of cancers of the skin.

Perry was the founder and director of forum for the Advancement of Dermatologic Surgery, 1983–Present, Evening Skin Surgery Workshops, 1983–Present, Advanced Flaps & Grafts Workshops, 1984–Present, One-year training program in Mohs Micrographic Surgery, 1966–Present and founded the International Alliance Against Skin Cancer in1997.

== Honors ==
Perry received awards and honors throughout his career some of them are:

- Award for Excellence in Education
- 14 Gold Triangle Awards for Excellence in Community Education
- Presidential Citation by the International Society of Dermatologic Surgery

== Bibliography ==
- Robins, Perry, and Michael Podwal. Play it safe in the sun. New York, N.Y: Skin Cancer Foundation, 1993. Print.
- Petres, Johannes, Rainer Rompel, and Perry Robins. Dermatologic Surgery: Textbook and Atlas. Berlin, Heidelberg: Springer Berlin Heidelberg, 1996. Print.
- Robins, Perry, and Maritza Perez. Understanding melanoma : what you need to know. New York: Skin Cancer Foundation, 2005. Print.
- Robins, Perry: “Mohs Chemosurgery for Tumors of the Periorbital Area,” Ocular and Adnexal Tumors (ed. F. A. Jakobiec) Aesculapius Publishing, Birmingham, 1978
- Robins, Perry; Dahmane, N; Lee, L; Heller, P; Ruiz I Ataba, A: “Activation of the Transcription Factor Gli 1 and the Sonic Hedgehog Signaling Pathway in Skin Tumors,” Nature, Vol. 389, Oct. 1997

== See also ==
- Journal of Drugs in Dermatology
- Mohs surgery
- Frederic E. Mohs
