= Avobenzone (data page) =

Chemical data page

The complete data for Avobenzone
General information
Chemical formula: C_{20}H_{22}O_{3}
Molar mass: 310.387 ^{a} g·mol^{−1}
Systematic name:
1-(4-methoxyphenyl)-3-(4-tert-butylphenyl)propane-1,3-dione ^{a}
Synonyms:
1-(4-(1,1-dimethylethyl)phenyl)-3-(4-methoxyphenyl)-1,3-propanedione
1-(4-(1,1-dimethylethyl)phenyl)-3-(4-methoxyphenyl)propane-1,3-dione
4-tert-butyl-4'-methoxydibenzoylmethane
Butyl methoxydibenzoylmethane
Parsol 1789
Photoplex
Database data
SMILES: CC(C)(C)C1=CC=C(C=C1)C(=O)CC(=O)C2=CC=C(C=C2)OC ^{a}
InChI=1/C20H22O3/c1-20(2,3)16-9-5-14(6-10-16)18(21)13-19(22)15-7-11-17(23-4)12-8-15/h5-12H,13H2,1-4H3 ^{a}

ATC: N/A	CAS: [70356-09-1]	DrugBank: N/A	EINECS: 274-581-6 ^{a}	PubChem: 51040 ^{a}

Physical properties

Structure	Crystal data	Spectral data: UV-Vis / IR / NMR / MS

Phase behavior	Solid properties ρ_{solid}: 1.037 g.cm^{−3} T_{m}: 80 - 85 °C	Liquid properties	Gas properties

Hazard properties

MSDS N/A	Main hazards: N/A	NFPA 704	Flash point: N/A	RTECS number: N/A

Chemical properties

XLogP: 5.162 ^{a}	pI:	pK_{a}:	Tautomers: 3 ^{a}	Hydrogen bond: donor - 0 ^{a}; acceptor - 3 ^{a}

Pharmacological properties

This box:
- Except where noted otherwise, data relate to Standard temperature and pressure.
- Reliability of data general note.
