= Methoxypropylamino cyclohexenylidene ethoxyethylcyanoacetate =

Organic compound used in sunscreen

Names
- IUPAC names: 2-ethoxyethyl (2Z)-2-cyano-2-[3-(3-methoxypropylamino) cyclohex-2-en-1-ylidene]acetate; 2-ethoxyethyl 2-cyano-2-[(1Z)-3-[(3-methoxypropyl)amino]cyclohex-2-en-1-ylidene]acetate
- Other names: Mexoryl 400; Colipa No. S 87; C-1701 B_C_3; C-1701 Merocyanine

Identifiers
CAS Number	1419401-88-9
3D model (JSmol)	Interactive image
Beilstein Reference	23320776
ChemSpider	74779394
EC Number	700-860-3
PubChem CID	71226339
CompTox Dashboard (EPA)	DTXSID901019869
- InChI: InChI=1S/C17H26N2O4/c1-3-22-10-11-23-17(20)16(13-18)14-6-4-7-15(12-14)19-8-5-9-21-2/h12,19H,3-11H2,1-2H3/b16-14- Key: NPNDSRGIZUPLNP-PEZBUJJGSA-N
- SMILES: CCOCCOC(=O)C(=C1CCCC(=C1)NCCCOC)C#N

Properties
Chemical formula	C_{17}H_{26}N_{2}O_{4}
Molar mass	322.405 g·mol^{−1}
Appearance	Yellow solid in the form of powder or small chunks
Melting point	85–120 °C (185–248 °F; 358–393 K)
Boiling point	306–315 °C (583–599 °F; 579–588 K)
Solubility in Ethanol	13% w/w
log P	1.7
Acidity (pK_{a})	13.3
UV-vis (λ_{max})	385
- Except where otherwise noted, data are given for materials in their standard state (at 25 °C [77 °F], 100 kPa). Infobox references

Methoxypropylamino cyclohexenylidene ethoxyethylcyanoacetate (INCI; sometimes abbreviated MCE) is an organic compound used in sunscreens to absorb UVA radiation. It is marketed as Mexoryl 400 by L'Oréal, and as UVMune by L'Oréal's subsidiary La Roche Posay. MCE has an absorption maximum at 385 nm, which is in the long-wave UVA range (UVA1, 360−400 nm). It is used exclusively in products manufactured by L'Oréal. MCE was developed by L'Oréal and BASF.

== Properties ==
MCE is a yellow solid in the form of powder or small chunks. At 25 °C, it is soluble in phenoxyethanol, dimethyl capramide, ethoxydiglycol, dimethyl isosorbide, and alcohol (ethanol), which are ingredients used in cosmetics.

It is considered a cyclic merocyanine.

== Safety and regulation ==
In 2019, MCE was approved for use up to a maximum concentration of 3% as a UV filter in cosmetics in the EU. In 2025, it was approved for use by the TGA in Australia up to a maximum concentration of 3%. It is not currently recognised or approved by the FDA for use in cosmetics in the US.

== See also ==
- Ecamsule (Mexoryl SX)
- Drometrizole trisiloxane (Mexoryl XL)
