= Acetanisole =

Names
- Preferred IUPAC name 1-(4-Methoxyphenyl)ethan-1-one
- Other names 4-Acetylanisole; para-Acetanisole; 4-Methoxyacetophenone; Linarodin; Novatone; Vananote; Castoreum anisole; 4-Methoxyphenyl methyl ketone

Identifiers
CAS Number	100-06-1
3D model (JSmol)	Interactive image
ChemSpider	7196
ECHA InfoCard	100.002.560
PubChem CID	7476
UNII	0IRH2BR587
CompTox Dashboard (EPA)	DTXSID2044347
- InChI: InChI=1S/C9H10O2/c1-7(10)8-3-5-9(11-2)6-4-8/h3-6H,1-2H3
- SMILES: CC(=O)C1=CC=C(C=C1)OC

Properties
Chemical formula	C_{9}H_{10}O_{2}
Molar mass	150.177 g·mol^{−1}
Appearance	White solid
Density	1.094 g/cm^{3}
Melting point	38.2 °C (100.8 °F; 311.3 K)
Boiling point	254 °C (489 °F; 527 K)
Solubility in water	2470 mg/L

Hazards
Flash point	138 °C (280 °F)
- Except where otherwise noted, data are given for materials in their standard state (at 25 °C [77 °F], 100 kPa). verify (what is ?) Infobox references

Acetanisole is an organic compound with the formula CH_{3}OC_{6}H_{4}C(O)CH_{3}. It can be viewed as derivative of acetophenone and of anisole. It has an aroma described as sweet, fruity, nutty, and similar to vanilla. In addition the odor of acetanisole is sometimes described as butter-like or caramel-like. It is used commercially in some soap fragrances. It is a component of anise oil.

== Preparation ==
Acetanisole can be prepared synthetically by Friedel-Crafts acylation of anisole with acetyl chloride:

== Reactions ==
4-Methoxyacetophenone is a standard substrate or product of much research, such as transfer hydrogenation and directed arylations.

== Applications ==
Acetanisole has practical uses in the synthesis of avobenzone, anethole trithione (Sulfarlem), benfurodil hemisuccinate, and methacetin.
