= Jericoacoara National Park =

National park in Ceará, Brazil

- Parque Nacional de Jericoacoara
- IUCN category II (national park)
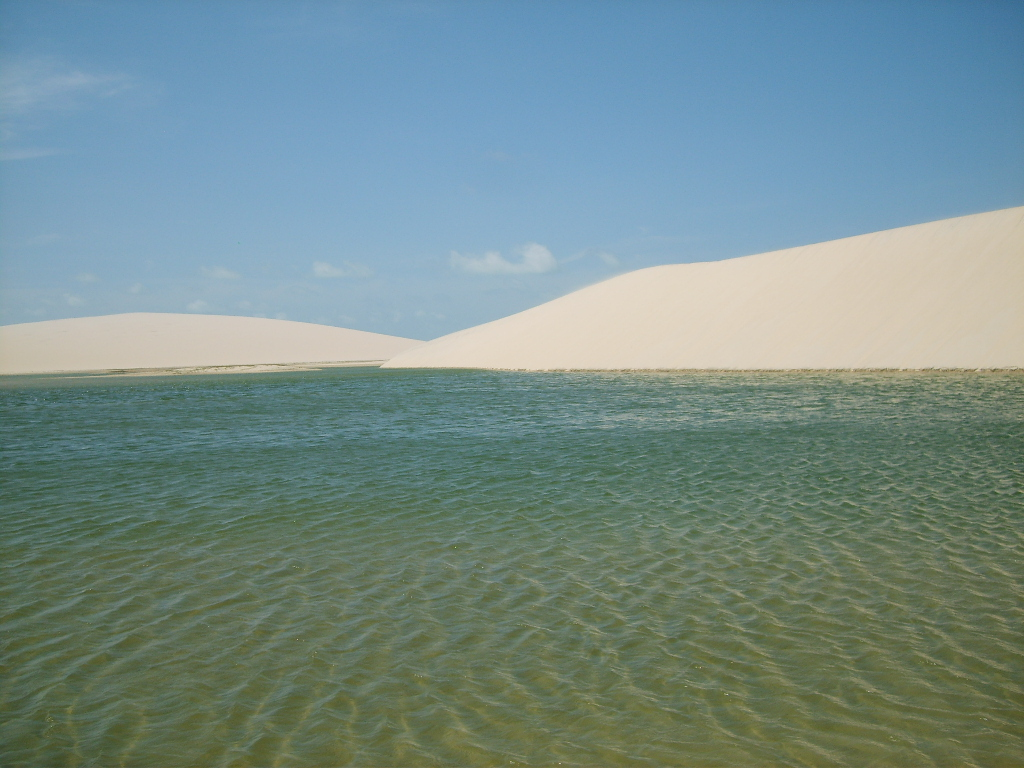
- Lake between the dunes in Jericoacoara

- Location within Brazil
- Coordinates: 2°47′S 40°30′W
- Area: 8,850 hectares (21,900 acres)
- Designation: National Park
- Established: 1984
- Administrator: Chico Mendes Institute for Biodiversity Conservation (ICMbio)

Jericoacoara National Park (Portuguese: Parque Nacional de Jericoacoara) is a national park of Brazil, located in the municipality of Jijoca de Jericoacoara, state of Ceará. On its seashore is located the famous Jericoacoara Beach.

== About Jericoacoara ==
The word Jericoacoara comes from Tupi (an indigenous language) and means "lair of turtles". It is a town and a beach of Ceará, as well as the name of the national park created in its surroundings. Jericoacoara is a location with favorable conditions for windsurfing and sandboarding.

A fact of some historical significance is the report of Vicente Yáñez Pinzón (Captain of Nau Nina, the fleet of Christopher Columbus), which anchored in the bay of Jericoacoara in 1499. But this was not official at the time as a result of the Treaty of Tordesillas, which was signed in the same year.

== Park ==
The Jericoacoara Environmental Protection Area (Portuguese: Área de Proteção Ambiental Jericoacoara) was established on 29 October 1984. It included the village of Jericoacoara, and had 8,416 hectares (20,800 acres). On 4 February 2002 the Jericoacoara National Park was created, taking over from the state environmental protection area, and a federal environmental protection area was established on the outskirts of the village to prevent further growth into the ecologically fragile dunes. In September 2005 this area of 207 hectares (510 acres) was incorporated in the park.
