= Journal of Drugs in Dermatology =

Medical journal

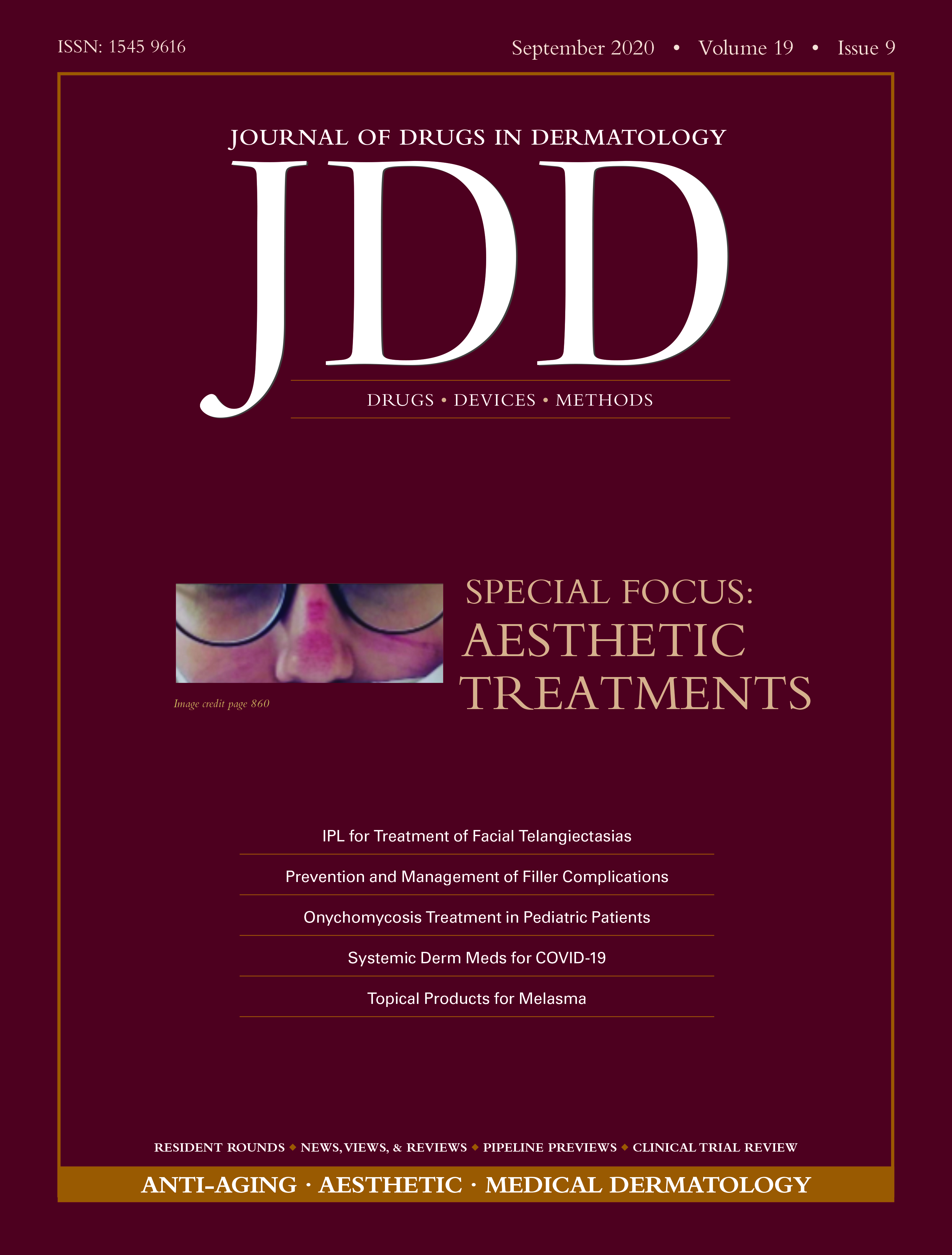
- September 2020 cover
- Discipline: Dermatology
- Language: English
- Edited by: Perry Robins; Deborah S. Sarnoff

Publication details
- History: 2002–present
- Publisher: SanovaWorks (USA)
- Frequency: Monthly
- Impact factor: 1.464 (2019)

Standard abbreviations
- ISO 4: J. Drugs Dermatol.

Indexing
- ISSN: 1545-9616

Links
- Journal homepage; Supplement library; CME offerings

The Journal of Drugs in Dermatology is a monthly peer-reviewed medical journal of dermatology published by Sanovaworks. The journal was established in 2002 by Mohs surgeon Perry Robins, founder of the Skin Cancer Foundation. It is the flagship publication of Sanovaworks, publisher of Derm-in-Review and Next Steps, as well as the sponsor of JDD Podcasts and two annual medical specialty conferences, Skin of Color Update (SOCU), and the ODAC Dermatology Aesthetic and Surgical (ODAC) conferences.

== Editors ==
The following persons have been co-editor-in-chief of the journal:

- Elizabeth Hale MD (2004)
- Susan H. Weinkle MD (2005–2008)
- Keyvan Nouri MD (2005–2008)
- Sherry H. Hsiung MD (2008)
- James M. Spencer MD (2009–2013)

== Abstracting and Indexing ==
The journal is abstracted and indexed in the following bibliographic databases:

- Index Medicus/MEDLINE/PubMed
- Science Citation Index Expanded
- Scopus
- Embase/Excerpta Medica
- EBSCO

The journal was accepted into the Science Citation Index in 2003 and received an impact factor in 2004. According to the Journal Citation Reports, the journal has a 2019 impact factor of 1.464.
