= Mechanochromic luminescence =

Mechanochromic luminescence (ML) references to intensity and/or color changes of (solid-state) luminescent materials induced by mechanical forces, such as rubbing, crushing, pressing, shearing, or smearing. Unlike "triboluminescence" which does not require additional excitation source other than force itself, ML is often manifested by external photoexcitation such as a UV lamp. The most common cause of ML is related to changes of intermolecular interactions of dyes and pigments, which gives rise to various strong (exciton splitting) and/or weak (Forster) excited state interactions. For example, a certain boron complex of sunscreen compound avobenzone exhibits reversible ML. A recent detailed study suggests that ML from the boron complex consists of two critical coupled steps: 1) generation of low energy exciton trap via mechanical perturbation; and 2) exciton migration from regions where photoexcitation results in a higher excited state. Since solid-state energy transfer can be very efficient, only a small fraction of the low-energy exciton traps is required when mechanical force is applied. As a result, for crystalline ML materials, XRD measurement may not able to detect changes before and after mechanical stimuli while its photoluminescence can be quite different.
