= Skin Cancer Foundation =

Non-profit organisation in the United States

The Skin Cancer Foundation
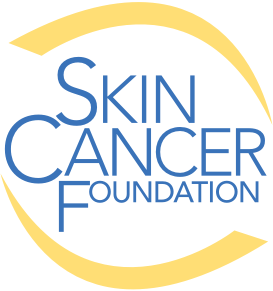
- Founded: 1979; 47 years ago
- Founder: Perry Robins, MD
- Purpose: Skin cancer prevention, early detection and treatment
- Location(s): 205 Lexington Avenue, 11th Floor; New York City, New York State, United States
- Region served: United States, International
- Method: Public education, professional organization
- President: Deborah S. Sarnoff, MD, F.A.A.D., F.A.C.P.
- Website: skincancer.org

The Skin Cancer Foundation (SCF), founded in 1979, aims to "empower people to take a proactive approach to daily sun protection and the early detection and treatment of skin cancer." The organization has developed a mix of programs and resources that serve the needs of a diverse audience. SCF disseminates information via its digital resources, public service campaigns and community programs, including Destination: Healthy Skin. The foundation's professional membership includes dermatologists, Mohs surgeons, plastic surgeons and other medical professionals working to fight skin cancer. Headquartered in New York City, the foundation is a 501(c)(3) public charity.

== Background statistics ==
More than five million nonmelanoma skin cancers are diagnosed annually in the U.S., and an estimated 207,390 cases of melanoma will be diagnosed in 2021. Every hour more than two people die from skin cancer. The primary cause of skin cancer is ultraviolet (UV) radiation from the sun and indoor tanning beds. The incidence and impact of skin cancer can be dramatically reduced through education, lifestyle changes, and early detection.

== Public information ==
The Foundation publishes disease prevention, detection and treatment information on SkinCancer.org the Sun & Skin News blog and their annual Journal. The Journal is distributed regularly to most dermatologists' offices nationwide. SCF ships posters, brochures, newsletters and Journals to medical offices, health clinics, schools and community centers across the country.

== Programs ==
In 2017, SCF's annual skin cancer screening program, Road to Healthy Skin Tour, was rebranded as Destination: Healthy Skin. SCF owns a customized RV, retrofitted with two exam rooms. The RV travels around the country and local volunteer dermatologists provide free full-body skin cancer screenings in the towns and cities visited. The organization engages local media to create a community dialogue about the need for sun safety, regardless of activity or location. SCF has provided approximately 25,000 free skin cancer screenings on board the RV since 2008.

The Big See is the Foundation's public service campaign, which empowers the public to take a proactive approach to skin cancer detection. The Big See leverages the seriousness of cancer (the big C) while highlighting the unique characteristic of skin cancer, which is that people can actually see it. The campaign urges the public to look for anything new, changing or unusual on their skin.

The Skin Cancer Foundation's Robins Nest program provides guidance to help skin cancer patients and caregivers navigate the complexities in gaining access to care. Robins Nest, with the help of its patient services navigator, aims to point the public in the right direction and connect them with a carefully curated collection of internal and external resources.

== Research ==
For 40 years, The Skin Cancer Foundation has been awarding research grants to physicians and investigators to support pilot research projects related to prevention, detection and treatment of skin cancer. Since 1981, many of the grantees' studies have led to important breakthroughs. SCF has funded more than $1.8 million in grants as of 2020.

Researchers are invited to submit applications for one-year projects to be conducted in the dermatology departments of medical institutions in the United States. Applications are open to dermatology residents, fellows and investigators within 10 years of their first academic appointment.

== Advocacy ==
The Foundation is a founding member of the National Council on Skin Cancer Prevention, a coalition of nonprofits and government organizations that collaborate on skin cancer prevention campaigns and advocacy initiatives. SCF is also a charter member of the Public Access to SunScreens (PASS) Coalition, which aims to help prevent skin cancer and improve public health by ensuring Americans have access to safe and effective sunscreens and evidence-based education on sun-safe practices.

In May 2014, the Food and Drug Administration (FDA) of the United States issued an order to re-classify tanning beds from class 1 (low-risk) to class II (moderate-risk) devices. On November 25, 2014, the Sunscreen Innovation Act was passed, streamlining the FDA's review process of new sunscreens and setting deadlines for decisions on new applications.

== International outreach ==
Public education abroad is sponsored by the International Alliance, representing 34 countries. The Foundation sponsors the annual International Dermatology Exchange Program (IDEP) and the biennial World Congress on Cancers of the Skin, with conferences hosted different countries around the world bringing attendees together from around the world. The IDEP is an interdisiplinary event for clinicians and scientists working in fields such as melanoma and nonmelanoma skin cancers.

The Skin Cancer Foundation has received the American Academy of Dermatology's Excellence in Education Award and 14 Gold Triangle Awards for Community Service. GreatNonProfits.org also awarded the organization with the 2020 Top-Rated Nonprofit Badge.

== See also ==
- Actinic keratosis
- Basal cell carcinoma
- Dysplastic nevi
- Melanoma
- Mohs surgery
- Squamous cell carcinoma
