= Jijoca de Jericoacoara =

Municipality in Ceará, Brazil

Coordinates: 2°47′37″S 40°30′29″W

Jijoca de Jericoacoara Jericoacoara
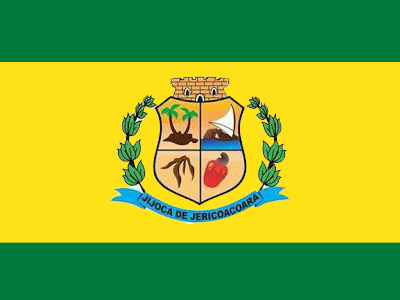
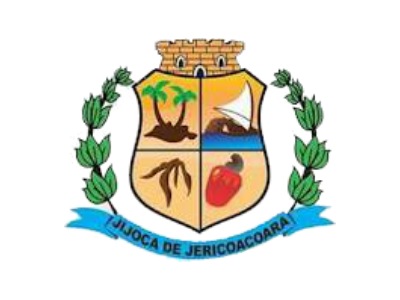
- Flag Coat of arms
- Nickname: "Jeri"
- Location of Jijoca de Jericoacoara in Ceará
- Country: Brazil
- Region: Northeast
- State: Ceará
- Founded: May 6, 1991

Government
  - Mayor: Sergio Herrero Gimenez (PSDB)

Area
  - Total: 201.858 km^{2} (77.938 sq mi)
- Elevation: 22 m (72 ft)

Population (2020)
  - Total: 20,087
  - Density: 82.5/km^{2} (214/sq mi)
- Time zone: UTC−3 (BRT)
- Website: http://www.jijocadejericoacoara.ce.gov.br

Jijoca de Jericoacoara (Portuguese pronunciation: [ʒiˈʒɔkɐ dʒi ʒɛɾikuˌakuˈaɾɐ]) is the northernmost municipality in the Brazilian state of Ceará, near the city of Cruz. It is known for its eponymous beach and national park. It is served by Jericoacoara airport, which opened in 2017.

== Name ==
The word Jericoacoara comes from the indigenous Tupi language and means "lair of turtles", from îurukûá "sea turtle" and kûara "lair, hole".

== History ==
A fact of some historical significance is the report of Vicente Yáñez Pinzón (Captain of Nau Niña, the fleet of Christopher Columbus), which anchored in the bay of Jericoacoara in 1499. But this was not official at the time as a result of the Treaty of Tordesillas, which was signed in the same year.
