= Department of Juvenile Justice =

A Department of Juvenile Justice is a system for treating juvenile delinquency.

Department of Juvenile Justice may also refer to:

== Australia ==
- New South Wales Department of Juvenile Justice

== United States ==
- The Alaska Division of Juvenile Justice
- The California Division of Juvenile Justice
- The Florida Department of Juvenile Justice
- The Georgia Department of Juvenile Justice
- The Illinois Department of Juvenile Justice
- The Kentucky Department of Juvenile Justice
- The New York City Department of Juvenile Justice
- The North Carolina Department of Juvenile Justice and Delinquency Prevention
- The South Carolina Department of Juvenile Justice
- The Texas Juvenile Justice Department
- The Virginia Department of Juvenile Justice
- The Office of Juvenile Justice and Delinquency Prevention, part of the US Department of Justice

== See also ==
- Juvenile court
- Youth detention center
