= Octyl methoxycinnamate =

UV-B protectant used in sunscreens

Names
- IUPAC name 2-ethylhexyl (E)-3-(4-methoxyphenyl)prop-2-enoate
- Other names Ethylhexyl methoxycinnamate Octinoxate; Uvinul MC80 (E)-3-(4-methoxyphenyl) prop-2-enoic acid 2-ethylhexyl ester

Identifiers
CAS Number	5466-77-3
3D model (JSmol)	Interactive image
ChEBI	CHEBI:88667
ChEMBL	ChEMBL1200608
ChemSpider	4511170
DrugBank	DB09496
ECHA InfoCard	100.157.824
EC Number	629-661-9
KEGG	D05225
PubChem CID	5355130
UNII	4Y5P7MUD51
CompTox Dashboard (EPA)	DTXSID9047205
- InChI: InChI=1S/C18H26O3/c1-4-6-7-15(5-2)14-21-18(19)13-10-16-8-11-17(20-3)12-9-16/h8-13,15H,4-7,14H2,1-3H3/b13-10+ Key: YBGZDTIWKVFICR-JLHYYAGUSA-N; InChI=1/C18H26O3/c1-4-6-7-15(5-2)14-21-18(19)13-10-16-8-11-17(20-3)12-9-16/h8-13,15H,4-7,14H2,1-3H3/b13-10+ Key: YBGZDTIWKVFICR-JLHYYAGUBM
- SMILES: O=C(OCC(CC)CCCC)\C=C\c1ccc(OC)cc1

Properties
Chemical formula	C_{18}H_{26}O_{3}
Molar mass	290.403 g·mol^{−1}
Density	1.01 g/cm^{3}
Melting point	−25 °C (−13 °F; 248 K)
Boiling point	198 to 200 °C (388 to 392 °F; 471 to 473 K)

Pharmacology
ATC code	D02BA02 (WHO)
Legal status	Banned in Thailand, Palau and Hawaii

Hazards
- GHS labelling
Pictograms	(GHS07: Exclamation mark) (GHS09: Environmental hazard)
Signal word	Warning
Hazard statements	H315, H319, H335, H411
Precautionary statements	P261, P264, P264+P265, P271, P273, P280, P302+P352, P304+P340, P305+P351+P338, P319, P321, P332+P317, P337+P317, P362+P364, P391, P403+P233, P405, P501
NFPA 704 (fire diamond)	1 1 0
- Except where otherwise noted, data are given for materials in their standard state (at 25 °C [77 °F], 100 kPa). verify (what is ?) Infobox references

Octyl methoxycinnamate or ethylhexyl methoxycinnamate (INCI) or octinoxate (USAN), trade names Eusolex 2292 and Uvinul MC80, is an organic compound that is an ingredient in some sunscreens and lip balms. It is an ester formed from methoxycinnamic acid and 2-ethylhexanol. It is a liquid that is insoluble in water.

It is primarily used in sunscreens and other cosmetics to absorb UV-B rays from the sun, protecting the skin from damage. It is also used to reduce the appearance of scars.

== Uses ==
Octyl methoxycinnamate is the most common active ingredient in sunscreens for protection against UV-B rays. It may be combined with oxybenzone and titanium dioxide.

Studies have evaluated the efficacy of octyl methoxycinnamate in preventing postoperative peritoneal adhesions and determined that octyl methoxycinnamate covering peritoneal surfaces decreases adhesion formation. This effect is more notable when octyl methoxycinnamate is applied before the induction of trauma.

Chromophore groups, such as C=C, C=O, and O-N=O, have loosely held electrons that are excited by radiation. Hence, octyl methoxycinnamate is able to absorb radiation when the electron energy level is increased to an excited state.

== Properties ==
The UV spectra of octyl methoxycinnamate contains a maximum at 310 nm.

== Synthesis ==
Olefin metathesis has been widely studied. One of the synthesis pathways for octyl methoxycinnamate includes cross metathesis. The high efficiency of the nitro-Grela catalyst has been used in the cross metathesis of trans-anethole with 2-ethylhexyl acrylate to produce octyl methoxycinnamate (86% yield).

== Safety studies ==
One study performed in 2000 raised safety concerns about octyl methoxycinnamate by demonstrating toxicity to mouse cells at concentrations lower than typical levels in sunscreens. However, another study concluded that octyl methoxycinnamate and other sun screening agents do not penetrate the outer skin in sufficient concentration to cause any significant toxicity to the underlying human keratinocytes.

Estrogenic and neurological effects were noted in laboratory animals at concentrations close to those experienced by sunscreen users and were also shown in vitro. Octyl methoxycinnamate has been shown to be light sensitive with a decrease in UV absorption efficiency upon light exposure. This degradation causes formation of the Z-octyl-p-methoxycinnamate from the E-octyl-p-methoxycinnamate. In contrast, the OMC does not show degradation when kept in darkness for extended periods of time.

A study carried out in 2017 by the Research Centre for Toxic Compounds in the Environment at Masaryk University, Czech Republic, indicates that octyl methoxycinnamate (EHMC) may damage human cell DNA. When exposed to sun rays, the spatial arrangement of its molecules changes and isomerisation takes place. While until now only unchanged EHMC has been researched, Masaryk University researchers focused on its isomers and found out that it has a significant genotoxic effect under lab conditions. It means that it may potentially damage human DNA and cause genome mutations which may lead to serious health risks.

In swimming pools with hypochlorite in aqueous solution, octyl methoxycinnamate has been shown to produce chlorine-substituted intermediates. The chlorination intermediates of octyl methoxycinnamate demonstrated weak mutagenic effects on the Salmonella typhimurium TA 100 strain. The reactions depended on the pH, compound structures, and chlorine dose. In the European Union, octyl methoxycinnamate is authorised as a cosmetic UV filter under Annex VI (entry 12) of the Cosmetics Regulation (EC) No 1223/2009, at a maximum concentration of 10% in finished products. Because the substance is endocrine-active, it was placed on the EU's 2019 priority list of potential endocrine disruptors, prompting a safety reassessment by the Scientific Committee on Consumer Safety (SCCS). In a final opinion published on 30 June 2025, the SCCS concluded that the filter is safe for consumers at concentrations up to 10%, maintaining the existing limit.

== Ecological damage ==
Concern about effects on coral reefs resulted in a bill in the state legislature of Hawaii to limit use of sunscreens containing octyl methoxycinnamate and oxybenzone.

For the same reasons, the government of Palau signed a law in 2018 (becoming effective in 2020) that restricted the sale and use of sunscreen and skincare products that contain a list of ten different chemicals, including the UV filters octyl methoxycinnamate, oxybenzone and octocrylene, with fines of US$1,000 for retailers who violate the law and the power to confiscate such products from non-commercial users.

== Stereochemistry ==
Octinoxate contains a stereocenter and a double bond. It has the following stereoisomers Therefore, octinoxate could consist of the following four stereoisomers:

Enantiomers of Octinoxate
	(R)-shape	(S)-shape
(E)-shape		
(Z)-shape		

== See also ==
- Amiloxate, a chemically related sunscreening agent
- Cinoxate, another cinnamic acid based sunscreen ingredient
- Avobenzone – UV-A protectant used in sunscreens
