= Cruz, Ceará =

Municipality in Ceará, Brazil

Cruz
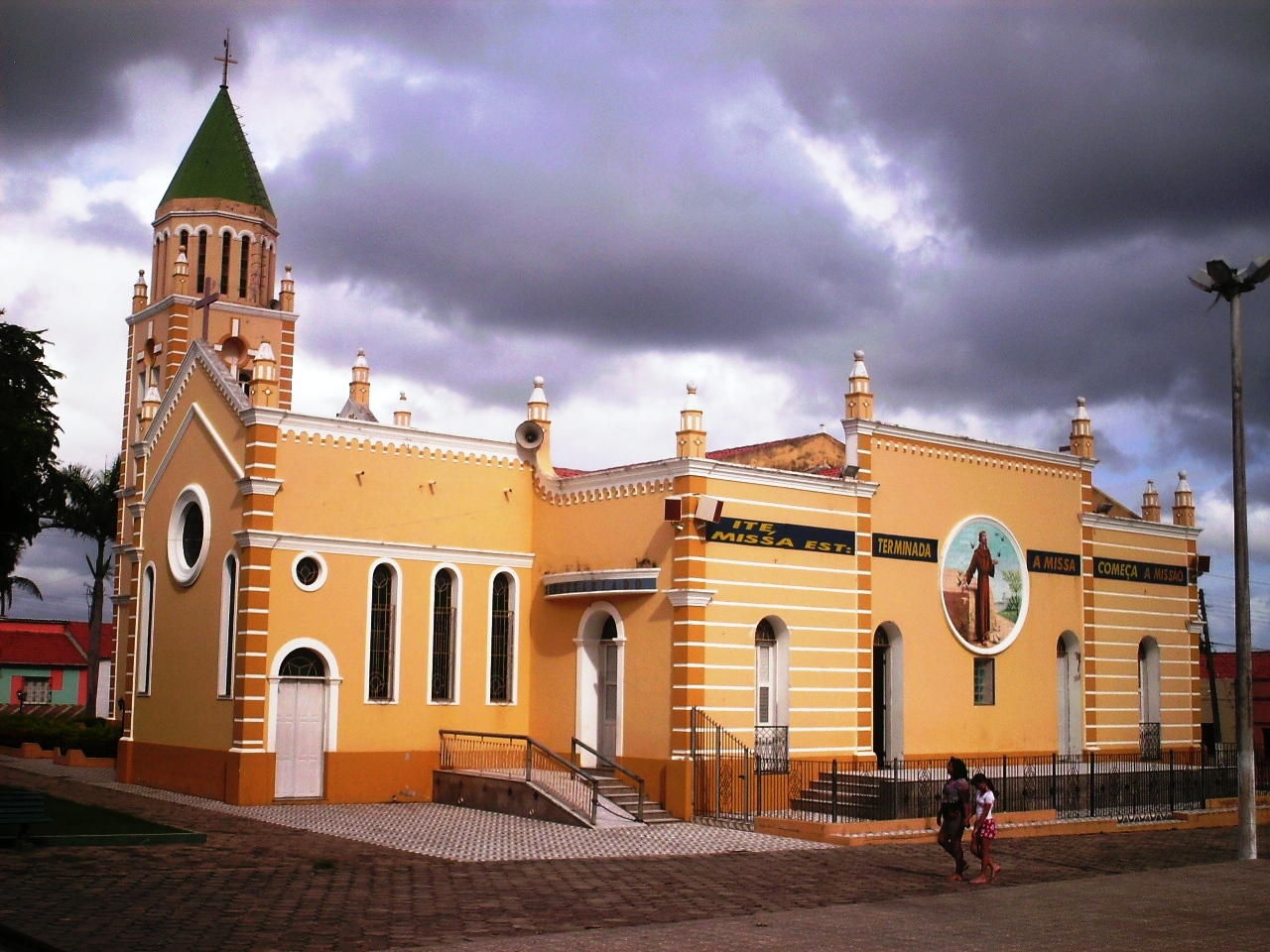
- Church in downtown Cruz

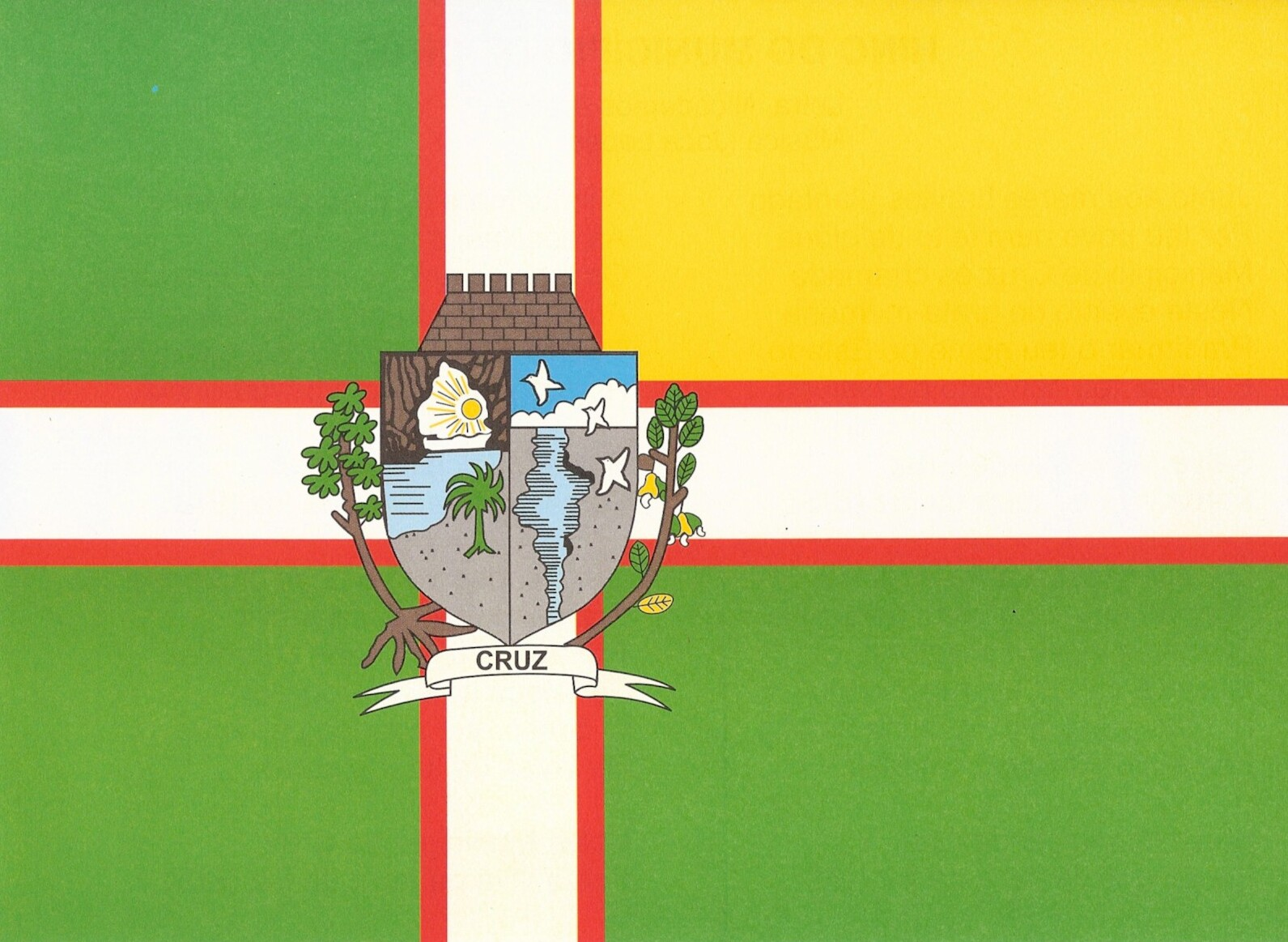
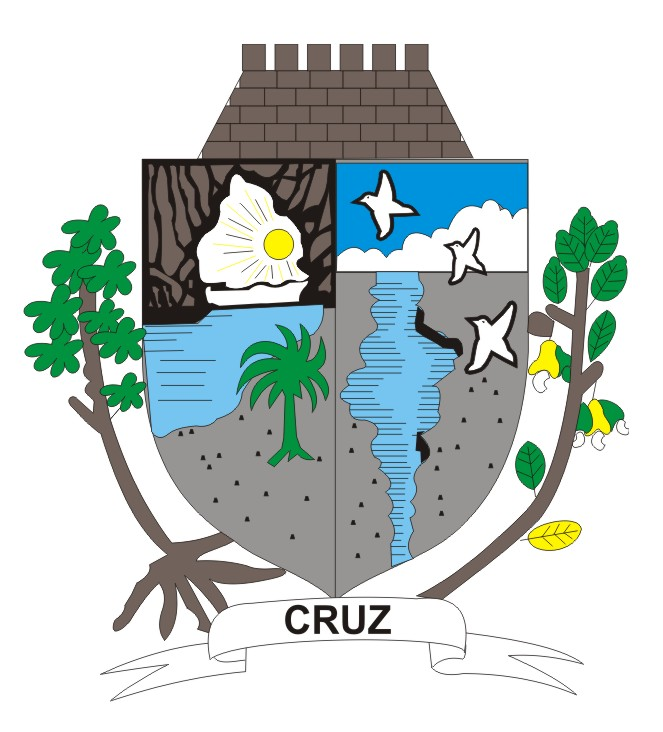
- Flag Coat of arms

- Location of Cruz in Ceará
- Coordinates: 2°55′4″S 40°10′19″W
- Country: Brazil
- Region: Northeast
- State: Ceará
- Founded: Jan 14, 1985

Government
  - Mayor: João Muniz Sobrinho PSDB (1° de janeiro de 2017–à atualidade)

Area
  - Total: 334,121 km^{2} (129,005 sq mi)

Population (2020)
  - Total: 24,977
  - Density: 67.28/km^{2} (174.3/sq mi)
- Time zone: UTC−3 (BRT)
- Postal Code: 62595-000
- Area code: +55 88
- Website: http://www.cruz.ce.gov.br/

Cruz is a city in Ceará, state of Brazil. The city lies on the Acaraú River near the northern Atlantic coast. As of 2020 the population was estimated at 24,977.

== Transport ==
The municipality is served by the Jericoacoara Airport (IATA: JJD, ICAO: SSVV).
