= Military College of Engineering =

Military College of Engineering may refer to:

- Instituto Militar de Engenharia, Brazil
- Military College of Engineering (Pakistan)
- College of Military Engineering, Pune
