= South Carolina Department of Juvenile Justice =

American state agency

The South Carolina Department of Juvenile Justice (DJJ) is a state agency of South Carolina, headquartered in Columbia. The agency operates juvenile correctional facilities. The department derives their authority from Title 63 Chapter 19 of the South Carolina Code of Laws.

== Facilities ==
Long-term commitment institutions (All are in Columbia):

- Birchwood
  - Birchwood opened in 1975.
- John G. Richards
  - Richards opened in 1966.
- Willow Lane Program for Girls (students attend the Birchwood School)
  - The facility opened in 1966 as the Riverside School for Girls.

The DJJ Juvenile Detention Center, a pre-trial facility, is in Columbia. It opened in 2001, replacing a facility that had been historically overcrowded.

Evaluation centers:

- Coastal Regional Evaluation Center (Ridgeville)
  - The center opened in 2002.
- Midlands Regional Evaluation Center (Columbia)
  - The center opened in 1997.
- Upstate Regional Evaluation Center (Unincorporated Union County, near Union)
  - The center opened in 1997.
