= JD =

JD, J.D. or jd may refer to:

== Arts and entertainment ==
- JD (film), a 2016 Bollywood film
- J.D. (Scrubs), nickname of Dr. John Dorian, fictional protagonist of the comedy-drama Scrubs
- JD Fenix, a character from the Gears of War video game series
- John Durairaj or JD, titular character of the 2021 Indian film Master, played by Vijay
- J. D.'s Revenge, 1976 motion picture
- Jade Dynasty (video game), a 2007 fantasy MMORPG
- Just Dance, video game series
- "J.D.", an episode of the sixth season of Fear the Walking Dead

== Businesses and organizations ==
- JD.com, a Chinese electronic commerce company
- Jack Daniel's, a whiskey brand, distilled in Tennessee, US
- Janata Dal, a political party in India
- John Deere, an agricultural machinery manufacturer
- JD Edwards, a former computer software company
- J.D. Power, a data analytics, software and consumer intelligence company
- JD Sports, a UK retail company
- J D Wetherspoon, a UK pub and restaurant chain
- Justdial, an Indian local search agency
- Dawson State Jail, operated by the Corrections Corporation of America and owned by the Texas Department of Criminal Justice
- Justice Democrats, an American political action committee
- Jnana Deepa, Institute of Philosophy and Theology, Pontifical Athenaeum, Pune, India
- Beijing Capital Airlines (IATA code JD), a Chinese airline

== People ==
- J Dilla (1974–2006), also known as Jay Dee, American hip-hop producer
- Jaedong (born 1990), South Korean professional StarCraft player
- Jaydee (born 1958), stage name for Robin Albers, Dutch house music producer and DJ
- Jadeveon Clowney (born 1993), American football player
- Jermaine Dupri (born 1972), rapper/music producer also known as JD
- John Doe/Jane Doe, a placeholder name for a party whose true identity is unknown or must be withheld
- Jonathan Davis (born 1971), American musician/singer from the nu metal band Korn
- Joop Donkervoort (born 1949), Dutch businessman
- Jonathon Douglass (born 1981), Australian Christian musician/singer
- J. D. Beresford (1873–1947), English writer
- JD Bertrand (born 2000), American football player
- J. D. Dillard (born 1987), American director, screenwriter, and producer
- J. D. Dix (born 2005), American baseball player
- J. D. Drew (born 1975), American baseball player
- Jason David Frank (1973–2022), actor and mixed martial artist who played the Green and White Power Ranger
- J. D. Hammer (born 1994), American Major League Baseball player
- J. D.–Jerry, Indian filmmaking duo
- J. D. Jones (born 1936), American firearms and cartridge designer, firearms writer, and president of SSK Industries
- J. D. King, several persons
- J. D. Martinez (born 1987), American baseball player
- JD McDonagh (born 1990), Irish professional wrestler and member of The Judgment Day.
- J. D. McDuffie (1938–1991), American racing driver
- J. D. Power III (1931–2021), American businessman
- J. D. Roth (born 1968), television personality
- J. D. Salinger (1919–2010), American author
- JD Souther (1945–2024), American singer, songwriter, and actor
- J. D. Tippit (1924–1963), American police officer
- JD Twitch (1968–2025), Scottish DJ, record producer
- JD Vance (born 1984), 50th vice president of the United States
- Joseph Saelee, American Tetris player

== Other uses ==
- Juris Doctor (J.D.), a degree in law
- Jamesville-DeWitt Central School District, New York
- Jason "J. D." Dean, a character and the main love interest in Heathers
- Java Decompiler, computer programmer's tool to decompile Java class files
- Jersey Devil, a cryptozoological animal
- Job description, an abbreviation for a person's nature of job or terms of reference (TOR)
- Jordanian dinar, the currency of Jordan (unofficially abbreviated "JD")
- Journal of Discourses, a historical periodical of The Church of Jesus Christ of Latter-day Saints
- Julian day, the Julian day number (JDN) plus the decimal fraction of the day
- Jury duty
- Juvenile delinquency
