= Amiloxate =

UV filter used in sunscreens

Names
- Preferred IUPAC name 3-Methylbutyl (2E)-3-(4-methoxyphenyl)prop-2-enoate
- Other names Isopentyl 4-methoxycinnamate; Isoamyl p-methoxycinnamate

Identifiers
CAS Number	71617-10-2
3D model (JSmol)	Interactive image
ChEMBL	ChEMBL1476782
ChemSpider	1266578
ECHA InfoCard	100.068.798
PubChem CID	1549789
UNII	376KTP06K8
CompTox Dashboard (EPA)	DTXSID301349309 DTXSID1046055, DTXSID301349309
- InChI: InChI=1S/C15H20O3/c1-12(2)10-11-18-15(16)9-6-13-4-7-14(17-3)8-5-13/h4-9,12H,10-11H2,1-3H3/b9-6+ Key: UBNYRXMKIIGMKK-RMKNXTFCSA-N; InChI=1/C15H20O3/c1-12(2)10-11-18-15(16)9-6-13-4-7-14(17-3)8-5-13/h4-9,12H,10-11H2,1-3H3/b9-6+ Key: UBNYRXMKIIGMKK-RMKNXTFCBL
- SMILES: CC(C)CCOC(=O)/C=C/C1=CC=C(C=C1)OC

Properties
Chemical formula	C_{15}H_{20}O_{3}
Molar mass	248.322 g·mol^{−1}
- Except where otherwise noted, data are given for materials in their standard state (at 25 °C [77 °F], 100 kPa). Infobox references

Amiloxate is an organic molecule used as UV filter in sunscreen products. It is approved for use in the European Union (since 1997) and is undergoing regulatory evaluation in the United States.

== See also ==
- Octyl methoxycinnamate
