= Avobenzone =

UV-A protectant used in sunscreens

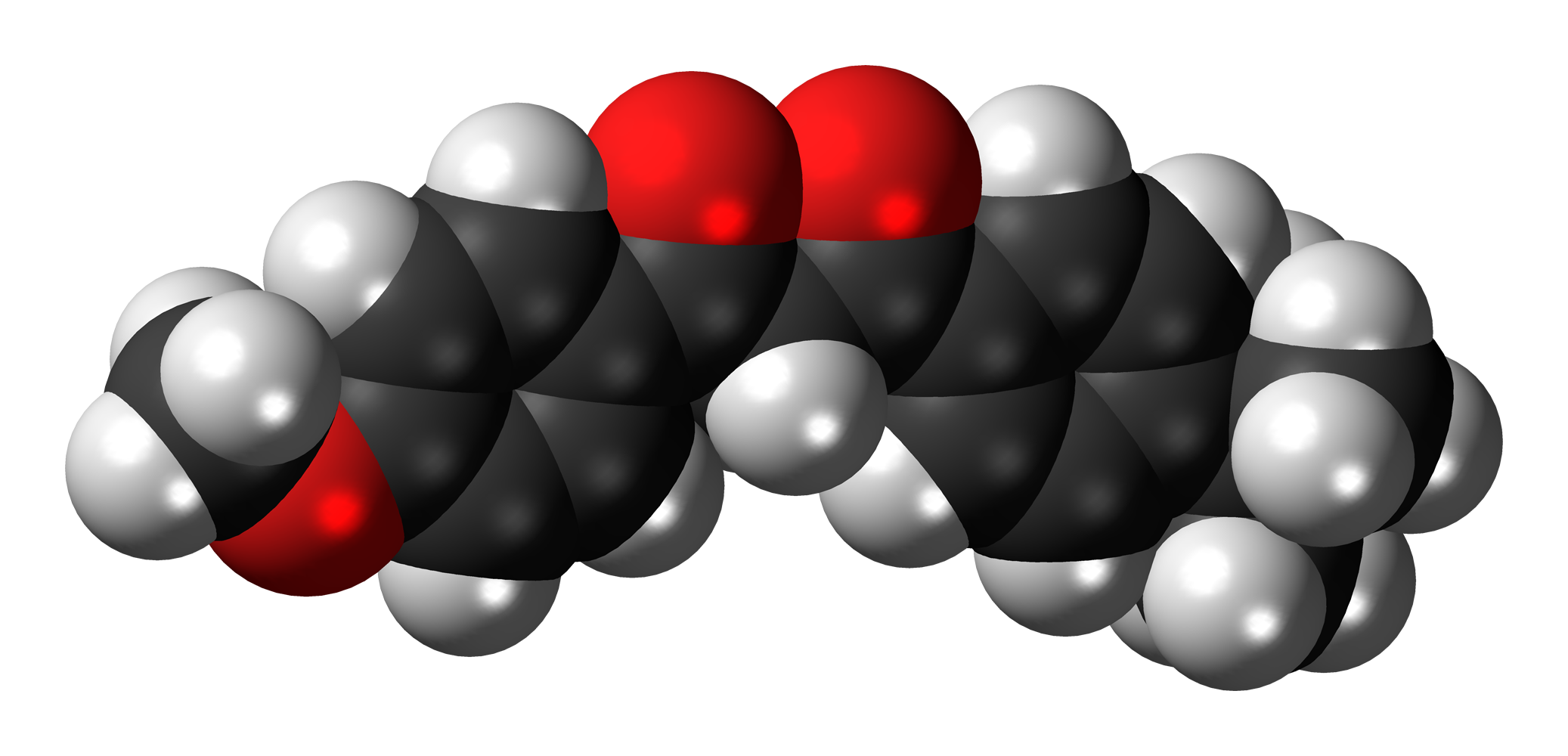

Names
- Preferred IUPAC name 3-(4-tert-Butylphenyl)-1-(4-methoxyphenyl)propane-1,3-dione
- Other names butylmethoxydibenzoylmethane; 4-tert-butyl-4'-methoxydibenzoylmethane

Identifiers
CAS Number	70356-09-1
3D model (JSmol)	Interactive image
ChEMBL	ChEMBL1200522
ChemSpider	46261
ECHA InfoCard	100.067.779
EC Number	274-581-6
KEGG	D03015
PubChem CID	51040
UNII	G63QQF2NOX
CompTox Dashboard (EPA)	DTXSID9044829
- InChI: InChI=1S/C20H22O3/c1-20(2,3)16-9-5-14(6-10-16)18(21)13-19(22)15-7-11-17(23-4)12-8-15/h5-12H,13H2,1-4H3 Key: XNEFYCZVKIDDMS-UHFFFAOYSA-N; InChI=1/C20H22O3/c1-20(2,3)16-9-5-14(6-10-16)18(21)13-19(22)15-7-11-17(23-4)12-8-15/h5-12H,13H2,1-4H3 Key: XNEFYCZVKIDDMS-UHFFFAOYAG
- SMILES: O=C(c1ccc(cc1)C(C)(C)C)CC(=O)c2ccc(OC)cc2

Properties
Chemical formula	C_{20}H_{22}O_{3}
Molar mass	310.39 g/mol
Appearance	colorless crystal

Supplementary data page
- Avobenzone (data page)
- Except where otherwise noted, data are given for materials in their standard state (at 25 °C [77 °F], 100 kPa). verify (what is ?) Infobox references

Avobenzone (trade names Parsol 1789, Milestab 1789, Eusolex 9020, Escalol 517, Neo Heliopan 357 and others, INCI Butyl Methoxydibenzoylmethane) is an organic molecule and an oil-soluble ingredient used in sunscreen products to absorb the full spectrum of UVA rays.

== History ==
Avobenzone was patented in 1973 and was approved in the EU in 1978. It was approved by the FDA in 1988. As of 2021, the FDA announced that they do not support avobenzone as being generally recognized as safe and effective (GRASE) citing the need for additional safety data. Avobenzone was banned in 2020 by the Palau government citing reef-toxicity concerns.

== Properties ==
Pure avobenzone is a whitish to yellowish crystalline powder with a weak odor, dissolving in isopropanol, dimethyl sulfoxide, decyl oleate, capric acid/caprylic, triglycerides and other oils. It is not soluble in water.

Avobenzone is a dibenzoylmethane derivative. Avobenzone exists in the ground state as a mixture of the enol and keto forms, favoring the chelated enol. This enol form is stabilized by intramolecular hydrogen-bonding within the β-diketone. Its ability to absorb ultraviolet light over a wider range of wavelengths than many other sunscreen agents has led to its use in many commercial preparations marketed as "broad spectrum" sunscreens. Avobenzone has an absorption maximum of 357 nm.

== Safety ==
Avobenzone is not generally recognised as safe and effective (GRASE) by the FDA for lack of sufficient data to support this claim. However, it is still the only FDA approved UVA filter (up to 3% concentration). Avobenzone is also approved in all other jurisdictions, such as EU (up to 5%), Australia, and Japan.

A 2017 study at Lomonosov Moscow State University found that chlorinated water and ultraviolet light can cause avobenzone to disintegrate into various other organic compounds, including; phenolic acids, aldehydes, phenols, and acetophenones which can cause adverse health effects.

== Stability ==
Avobenzone is sensitive to the properties of the solvent, being relatively stable in polar protic solvents and unstable in nonpolar environments. Also, when it is irradiated with UVA light, it generates a triplet excited state in the keto form which can either cause the avobenzone to degrade or it can transfer energy to biological targets and cause deleterious effects.

Avobenzone has been shown to degrade significantly in light, resulting in less protection over time. The UV-A light in a day of sunlight in a temperate climate is sufficient to break down most of the compound. Data presented to the Food and Drug Administration by the Cosmetic, Toiletry and Fragrance Association indicates a −36% change in avobenzone's UV absorbance following one hour of exposure to sunlight. For this reason, in sunscreen products, avobenzone is always formulated together with a photostabilizer, such as octocrylene. Other photostabilizers include:

- 4-Methylbenzylidene camphor (USAN Enzacamene)
- Tinosorb S (USAN Bemotrizinol, INCI Bis-Ethylhexyloxyphenol Methoxyphenyl Triazine)
- Tinosorb M (USAN Bisoctrizole, INCI Methylene Bis-Benzotriazolyl Tetramethylbutylphenol)
- Butyloctyl Salicylate (Tradename HallBrite BHB - )
- Hexadecyl Benzoate
- Butyloctyl Benzoate
- HallBrite PSF (INCI Undecylcrylene DimethiconeE)
- Mexoryl SX (USAN Ecamsule, INCI Terephthalylidene Dicamphor Sulfonic Acid)
- Synoxyl HSS (INCI Trimethoxybenzylidene Pentanedione)
- Corapan TQ (INCI Diethylhexyl 2,6-Naphthalate)
- Parsol SLX (INCI Polysilicone-15)
- Oxynex ST (INCI Diethylhexyl Syringylidene Malonate
- Polycrylene (INCI Polyester-8)
- SolaStay S1 (INCI Ethylhexyl Methoxycrylene)
- Octyl Salicylate (INCI Ethylhexyl Salicylate)

Complexing avobenzone with cyclodextrins may also increase its photostability. Formulations of avobenzone with hydroxypropyl-beta-cyclodextrin have shown significant reduction in photo-induced degradation, as well as decreased transdermal penetration of the UV absorber when used in high concentrations.

The photostability of avobenzone is further increased when sunscreens are formulated with antioxidant compounds. Mangiferin, glutathione, ubiquinone, vitamin C, vitamin E, beta-carotene and trans-resveratrol have all demonstrated some ability to protect avobenzone from photodegradation. The stability and efficacy of avobenzone seems to continue to increase as a greater amount of antioxidants are added to the sunscreen.

According to some studies, "the most effective sunscreens contain avobenzone and titanium dioxide." Avobenzone can degrade faster in light in combination with mineral UV absorbers like zinc oxide and titanium dioxide, though with the right coating of the mineral particles this reaction can be reduced. A manganese doped titanium dioxide may be better than undoped titanium dioxide to improve avobenzone's stability.

=== Various ===
As an enolate, avobenzone forms with heavy metal ions (such as Fe^{3+}) colored complexes, and chelating agents can be added to suppress them. Stearates, aluminum, magnesium and zinc salts can lead to poorly soluble precipitates. Manufacturers also recommend to avoid the inclusion of iron and ferric salts, heavy metals, formaldehyde donors and PABA and PABA esters.

Avobenzone in sunscreen may stain clothes yellow-orange and make them sticky if washed in iron-rich water, as it reacts with iron to produce rust. The damage can be undone with a rust remover or stain remover. The staining properties of sunblock made with avobenzone are particularly noticeable on fiberglass boats with white gelcoat.

Avobenzone also reacts with boron trifluoride to form a stable crystalline complex that is highly fluorescent under UV irradiation. The emission color of the crystals depends on the molecular packing of the boron avobenzone complex. The photoluminescence may also be altered by mechanical force in the solid state, resulting in a phenomenon called "mechanochromic luminescence". The altered emission color recovers itself slowly at room temperature or more swiftly at higher temperatures.

=== Absorbance spectrum ===
Avobenzone has a peak absorbance around 360 nm when dissolved. The peak may shift slightly depending on the solvent.

Absorbance of 0.01 g-L avobenzone in DMSO

== Preparation ==
The compound is prepared by reacting 4-tert-butylbenzoic methyl ester (from 4-tert-butylbenzoic acid by esterification with methanol) with 4-methoxyacetophenone in toluene in the presence of sodium amide via Claisen condensation.

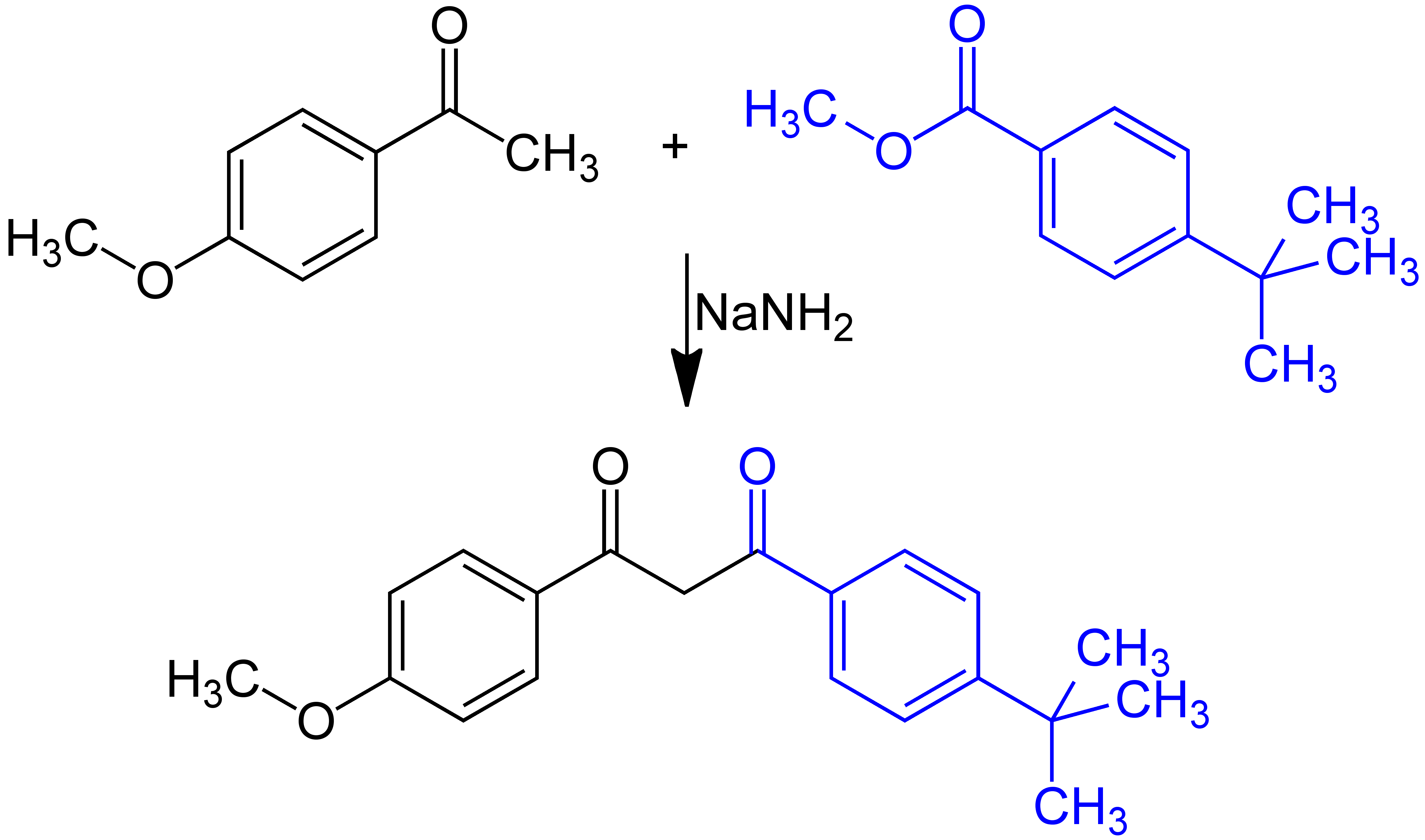
Synthese Avobenzon

According to a recent patent application, yields of up to 95% are obtained with the same starting materials in toluene in the presence of potassium methoxide.

It is subject to keto-enol tautomerism and exists predominantly enol when dissolved. Upon UV radiation, it may convert to keto form, while converting back to enol form after placing in dark.

== See also ==
- Sun protection factor
