= Sunscreen Innovation Act =

US legislative piece

- Long title: To amend the Federal Food, Drug, and Cosmetic Act to provide an alternative process for review of safety and effectiveness of nonprescription sunscreen active ingredients and for other purposes.
- Announced in: the 113th United States Congress
- Sponsored by: Rep. Ed Whitfield (R, KY-1)
- Number of co-sponsors: 1

Codification
- Acts affected: Federal Food, Drug, and Cosmetic Act
- U.S.C. sections affected: 18 U.S.C. § 1905, 5 U.S.C. § 552, 21 U.S.C. § 351 et seq.
- Agencies affected: United States Congress, Department of Health and Human Services, Food and Drug Administration

Legislative history
- Introduced in the House as H.R. 4250 by Rep. Ed Whitfield (R, KY-1) on March 13, 2014; Committee consideration by United States House Committee on Energy and Commerce, United States House Energy Subcommittee on Health; Passed the House on July 28, 2014 (voice vote)

The Sunscreen Innovation Act (S. 2141, Pub. L. 113–195 (text) (PDF)) is a U.S. federal law passed by the House in 2014 that amended the Federal Food, Drug, and Cosmetic Act to establish an expedited process for the review and approval of over-the-counter (OTC) sunscreens. The United States Food and Drug Administration (FDA) had not approved a new active ingredient in sunscreen since 1999, despite some sunscreens having been approved and used overseas for a decade. The new law gave the FDA one year to respond to the existing backlog of sunscreen ingredient approval requests, and then 18 months to reply to any future applications.

The bill was introduced during the 113th United States Congress by Rep. Ed Whitfield (R, KY-1) and Sen. Jack Reed (D, RI), and signed into law by president Barack Obama on November 26, 2014.

== Background ==
Sunscreen (also commonly known as sun screen, sunblock, suntan lotion, sunburn cream, sun cream or block out) is a lotion, spray, gel or other topical product that absorbs or reflects some of the sun's ultraviolet (UV) radiation on the skin exposed to sunlight and thus helps protect against sunburn. Depending on the mode of action, sunscreens can be classified into physical sunscreens (i.e., those that reflect the sunlight) or chemical sunscreens (i.e., those that absorb the UV light).

Medical organizations such as the American Cancer Society recommend the use of sunscreen because it aids in the prevention of squamous cell carcinomas. Many sunscreens do not block UVA radiation, which does not cause sunburn but can increase the rate of melanoma and photodermatitis, so people using sunscreens may be exposed to high UVA levels without realizing it. The use of broad-spectrum (UVA/UVB) sunscreens can address this concern. Diligent use of sunscreen can also slow or temporarily prevent the development of wrinkles and sagging skin.

== Provisions of the bill ==
This summary is based largely on the summary provided by the Congressional Research Service, a public domain source.

The Sunscreen Innovation Act would amend the Federal Food, Drug, and Cosmetic Act to establish a process for the review and approval of over-the-counter (OTC) sunscreens.

The bill would require the United States Secretary of Health and Human Services (HHS) to review and determine whether OTC sunscreens are generally recognized as safe and effective and ensure that any sunscreens marketed in the United States are appropriately labeled.

The bill would make sunscreens that have been marketed for five continuous years in the United States or other countries and in sufficient quantity eligible for review under this Act.

The bill would establish a framework for the review and approval by the Food and Drug Administration (FDA) of OTC sunscreens with new active ingredients. Sets forth time frame requirements for review. Requires applications for review to include safety and efficacy data as well as adverse drug experience information.

The bill would direct the Secretary to report on the progress made in issuing timely decisions on the safety and effectiveness of OTC sunscreens.

The bill would require the Secretary to make determinations on the testing and labeling of aerosol sunscreens and on whether a sunscreen may contain a label indicating a sun protection factor (SPF) greater than 50.

== Congressional Budget Office report ==
This summary is based largely on the summary provided by the Congressional Budget Office, as ordered reported by the House Committee on Energy and Commerce on July 15, 2014. This is a public domain source.

H.R. 4250 would modify the review process that allows the marketing of certain new ingredients in non-prescription sunscreen based on a determination by the Food and Drug Administration (FDA) that they are generally recognized as safe and effective. The Congressional Budget Office (CBO) estimates that implementing H.R. 4250 would cost $28 million over the 2015–2019 period, assuming appropriation of the necessary amounts. H.R. 4250 would not affect direct spending or revenues; therefore, pay-as-you-go procedures do not apply.

H.R. 4250 contains no intergovernmental mandates as defined in the Unfunded Mandates Reform Act (UMRA).

The bill would impose private-sector mandates, as defined in UMRA, because it would allow FDA to require that marketing applications for certain sunscreen products be submitted in a new standardized format. CBO estimates that the direct cost of complying with those requirements would not exceed the annual threshold established by UMRA for private-sector mandates ($152 million in 2014, adjusted annually for inflation).

== Debate and discussion ==
The Melanoma Research Alliance supported the bill. In a video produced by the group, a melanoma survivor said that "when I heard that there were actually ingredients that the FDA is basically holding hostage, it infuriates me, it's crazy."

The Centers for Disease Control and Prevention reported that in 2010 over 60,000 Americans were diagnosed with melanoma. The most common form of cancer in the United States is skin cancer.

In 2009, chemical company and sunscreen manufacturer Ashland Inc. "significantly expanded its existing sunscreen production facilities in Columbus, Ohio, after the FDA announced it expected to make decisions on the pending ingredient applications before the end of the year." Five years later, the FDA had still not made a decision and Ashland was unable to sell this type of sunscreen in the United States.

== See also ==
- List of bills in the 113th United States Congress
