= Comte. Ariston Pessoa Regional Airport =

Comte. Ariston Pessoa Regional Airport Aeroporto Regional Comte. Ariston Pessoa
- IATA: JJD; ICAO: SBJE; LID: CE0003

Summary
- Airport type: Public
- Operator: Socicam (?–2023); Infraero (2023–2025); Dix Empreendimentos (2025-2025); Fraport Brasil (2025–present)
- Serves: Jijoca de Jericoacoara
- Location: Cruz, Brazil
- Opened: 24 June 2017
- Time zone: BRT (UTC−03:00)
- Elevation AMSL: 27 m (89 ft)
- Coordinates: 02°54′24″S 040°21′29″W

Map
- Location in Brazil

Runways
Direction	Length		Surface
Direction	m	ft	Surface
08/26	2,200	7,218	Asphalt

Statistics (2024)
- Passengers: 221,818
- Aircraft Operations: 2,935
- Metric tonnes of cargo: 355
- Statistics: Infraero; Sources: Airport Website, ANAC, DECEA

Comte. Ariston Pessoa Regional Airport (IATA: JJD, ICAO: SBJE), is the airport serving Jijoca de Jericoacoara, Brazil, located in the adjoining municipality of Cruz.

It is managed by Fraport Brasil in brazil.

== History ==
The airport was commissioned on June 24, 2017.

Previously operated by Socicam, on August 23, 2023 the State of Ceará signed a contract of operation with Infraero. However, on April 15, 2025 a new one-year contract was signed with Dix Empreendimentos.

On November 27, 2025 Fraport Brasil won a concession to operate the airport.

== Airlines and destinations ==
Airlines	Destinations
Azul Brazilian Airlines	Belo Horizonte–Confins
Gol Linhas Aéreas	São Paulo–Guarulhos
Latam Brasil	São Paulo–Guarulhos

== Access ==
The airport is located 31 km (19 mi) from Jericoacoara and 23 km (14 mi) from downtown Cruz.

== See also ==
- List of airports in Brazil
