= Ecamsule =

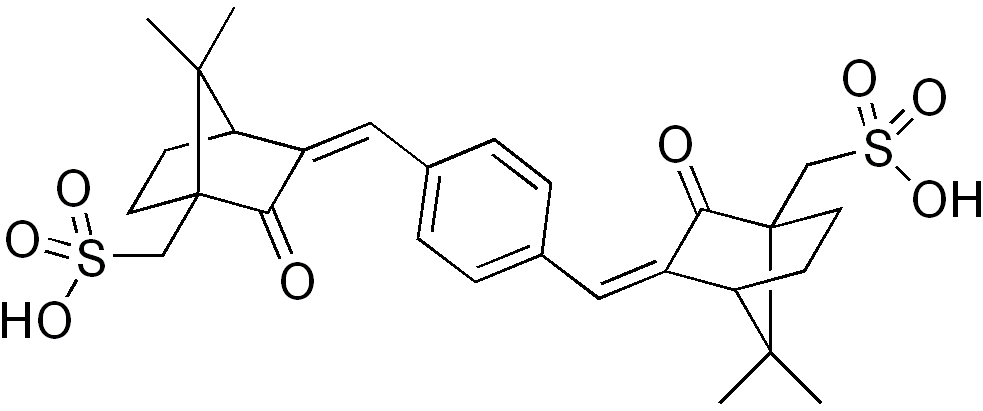

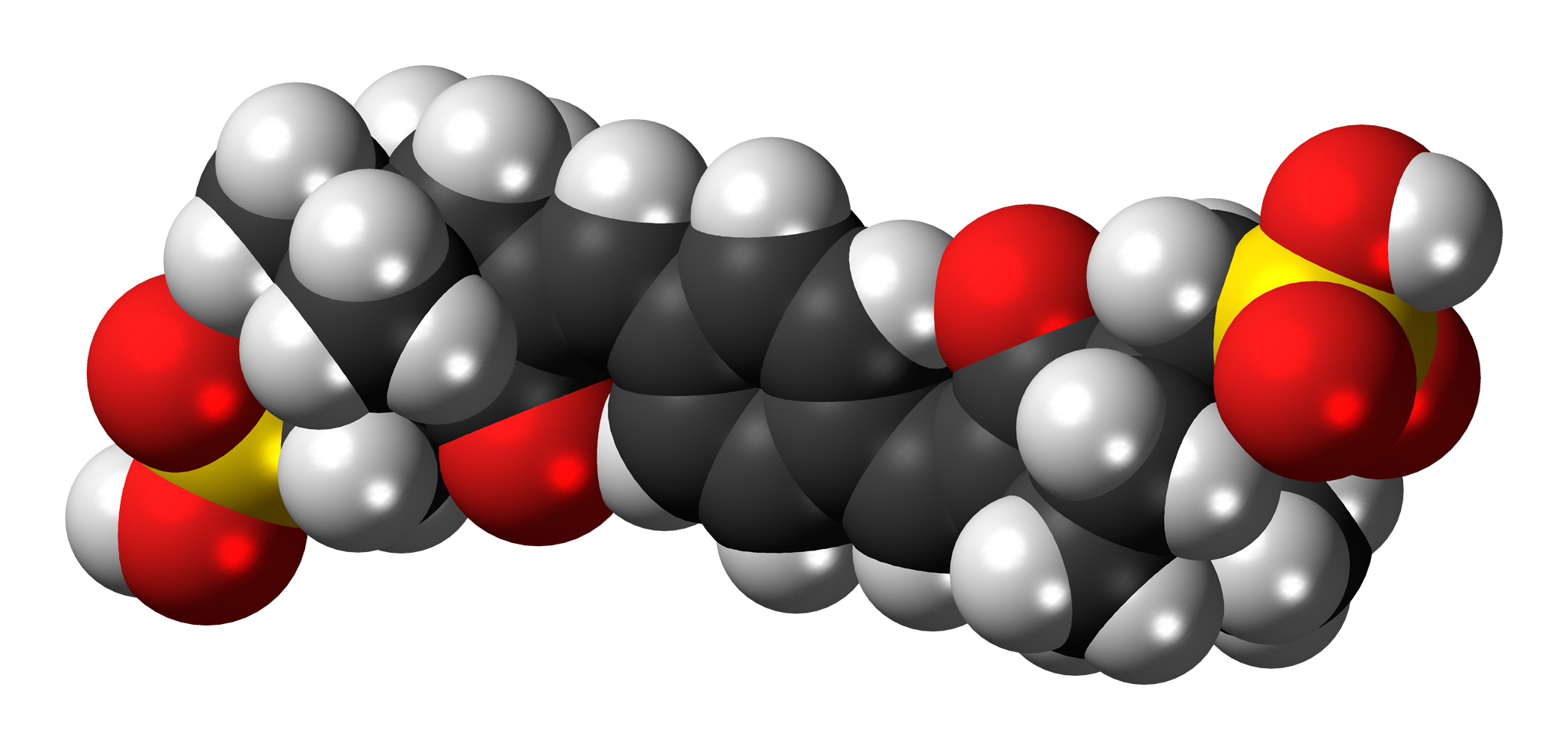

Names
- IUPAC name [(3Z)-3-[[4-[(Z)-[7,7-Dimethyl-2-oxo-1-(sulfomethyl)-3-bicyclo[2.2.1]heptanylidene]methyl]phenyl]methylidene]-7,7-dimethyl-2-oxo-1-bicyclo[2.2.1]heptanyl]methanesulfonic acid
- Other names Mexoryl SX; Terephthalylidene dicamphor sulfonic acid

Identifiers
CAS Number	92761-26-7
3D model (JSmol)	Interactive image
ChemSpider	4946116
ECHA InfoCard	100.101.049
KEGG	D03932
PubChem CID	6442003
UNII	M94R1PM439
CompTox Dashboard (EPA)	DTXSID80869056
- InChI: InChI=1S/C28H34O8S2/c1-25(2)21-9-11-27(25,15-37(31,32)33)23(29)19(21)13-17-5-7-18(8-6-17)14-20-22-10-12-28(24(20)30,26(22,3)4)16-38(34,35)36/h5-8,13-14,21-22H,9-12,15-16H2,1-4H3,(H,31,32,33)(H,34,35,36)/b19-13-,20-14- Key: HEAHZSUCFKFERC-AXPXABNXSA-N; InChI=1/C28H34O8S2/c1-25(2)21-9-11-27(25,15-37(31,32)33)23(29)19(21)13-17-5-7-18(8-6-17)14-20-22-10-12-28(24(20)30,26(22,3)4)16-38(34,35)36/h5-8,13-14,21-22H,9-12,15-16H2,1-4H3,(H,31,32,33)(H,34,35,36)/b19-13-,20-14- Key: HEAHZSUCFKFERC-AXPXABNXBW
- SMILES: O=S(=O)(O)CC45C(=O)\C(=C/c1ccc(cc1)/C=C2\C(=O)C3(CCC2C3(C)C)CS(=O)(=O)O)C(CC4)C5(C)C

Properties
Chemical formula	C_{28}H_{34}O_{8}S_{2}
Molar mass	562.69 g·mol^{−1}
Melting point	255 °C (491 °F; 528 K) (dec)
log P	1.35
- Except where otherwise noted, data are given for materials in their standard state (at 25 °C [77 °F], 100 kPa). verify (what is ?) Infobox references

Ecamsule (USAN, trade name Mexoryl SX, INCI terephthalylidene dicamphor sulfonic acid) is an organic compound which is added to many sunscreens to filter out UVA rays. It is a benzylidene camphor derivative, many of which are known for their excellent photostability.

== Mode of action ==
Exposed to UV, ecamsule undergoes reversible photoisomerization, followed by photoexcitation. The absorbed UV is then released as thermal energy, without penetrating the skin.

UVB rays cause short-term sunburn and skin cancer; UVA rays cause wrinkling and may have some role in development of skin cancer. There is no official rating for UVA protection in the US. In Europe, there are several different rating systems that are used to measure effectiveness in blocking UVA rays, including the IPD (immediate pigment darkening assay) and the PPD (persistent pigment darkening assay). Ecamsule protects against UV wavelengths in the 290–400 nanometer range, with peak protection at 345 nm. Because ecamsule does not cover the entire UV spectrum, it should be combined with other active sunscreen agents to ensure broad-spectrum UV protection. Ecamsule is a photostable organic UVA absorber, meaning it doesn't degrade significantly when exposed to light. This is in contrast to the widely used UVA absorber avobenzone that is not intrinsically photostable and requires photostabilizers to prevent significant degradation in light.

== Efficacy ==
A 5% ecamsule containing sunscreen can prevent early changes leading to photoaging in humans. A broad spectrum sunscreen with ecamsule, avobenzone and octocrylene significantly reduces the skin damage associated with UV exposure in human subjects.

In studies done in mice it reduces the formation of UV induced pyrimidine dimers and delays the onset of skin cancer. In vitro ecamsule effectively protects against the harmful effects of UV.

Ecamsule demonstrates a synergistic effect in UV protection when used with drometrizole trisiloxane (Mexoryl XL).

== Safety ==
Ecamsule has little percutaneous absorption and little systemic effects, therefore it is considered relatively safe. A mouse study shows that it does not increase the probability of promoting skin cancer. Studies done in vitro show that it is not photomutagenic.

Because ecamsule is an acid it needs to be neutralized in order to be used without offsetting the final pH of the sunscreen too much. Usually this is done with triethanolamine.

== Availability ==
L'Oréal patented ecamsule first in 1982. It was approved in the EU in 1991. Sunscreens based on ecamsule have been available in Europe, Canada and other parts of the world since 1993. Ecamsule was given approval by the FDA in 2006 to be used in the U.S. However this approval only extends to ecamsule-containing sunscreens registered under a New Drug Application, not ecamsule itself.

== See also ==
- Drometrizole trisiloxane – A UV filter often used with ecamsule
