= Drometrizole trisiloxane =

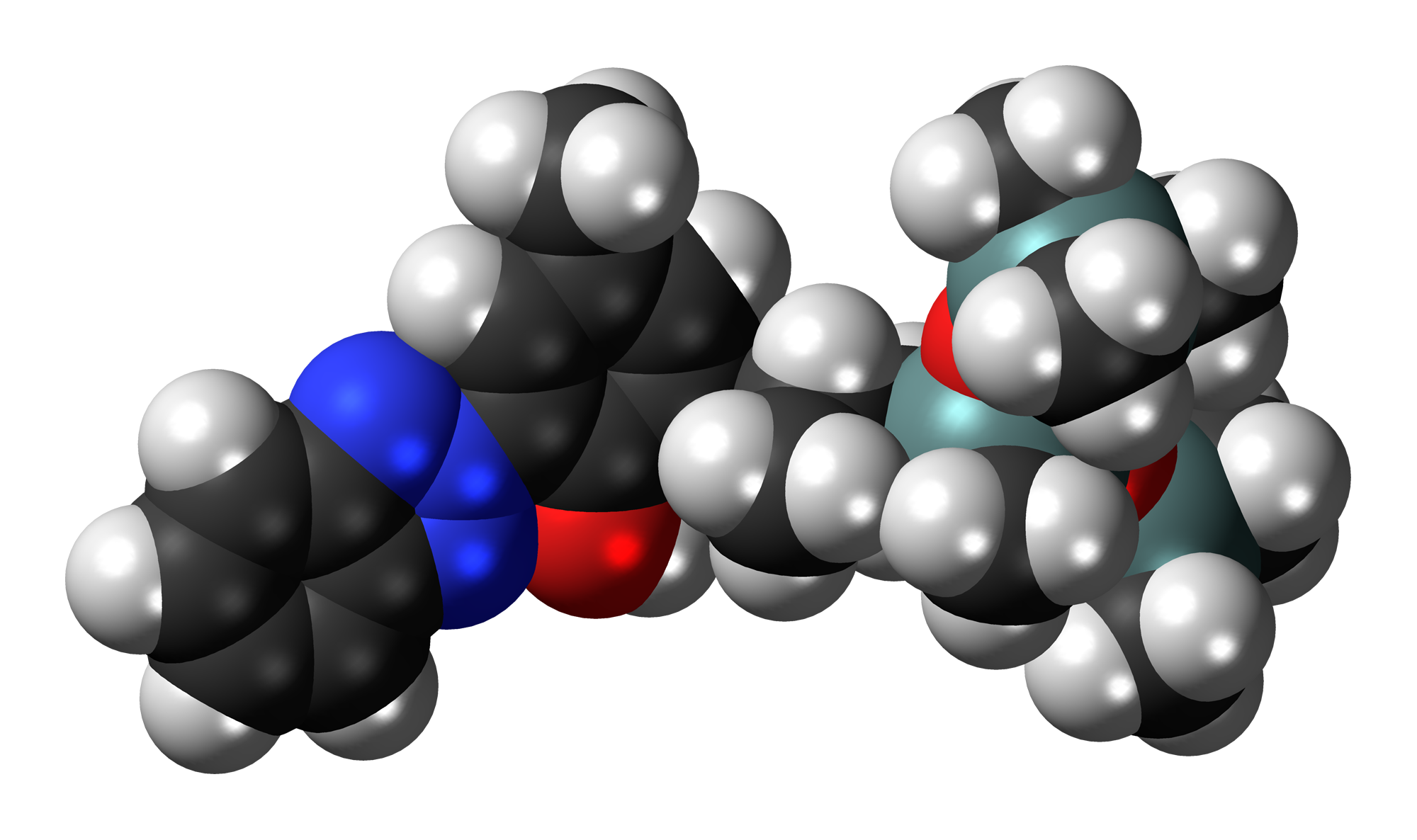

Names
- Preferred IUPAC name 2-(2H-Benzotriazol-2-yl)-4-methyl-6-[2-methyl-3-[1,3,3,3-tetramethyl-1-[(trimethylsilyl)oxy]-1-disiloxanyl]propyl]phenol
- Systematic IUPAC name 2-(2H-1,2,3-Benzotriazol-2-yl)-4-methyl-6-[2-methyl-3-(2,2,4,6,6-pentamethyl-3,5-dioxa-2,4,6-trisilaheptan-4-yl)propyl]phenol
- Other names 2-(1,2,3-Benzotriazol-2-yl)-4-methyl-6-[2-methyl-3-(2,2,4,6,6-pentamethyl-3,5-dioxa-2,4,6-trisilaheptan-4-yl)propyl]phenol; Silatrizole

Identifiers
| CAS Number | 155633-54-8 |
| 3D model (JSmol) | Interactive image; Interactive image |
| ChemSpider | 8024601 |
| DrugBank | DB11585 |
| ECHA InfoCard | 100.121.988 |
| EC Number | 919-634-2 |
| PubChem CID | 9848888 |
| UNII | HC22845I1X |
| CompTox Dashboard (EPA) | DTXSID40431753 |
- InChI: InChI=1S/C24H39N3O3Si3/c1-18-14-20(15-19(2)17-33(9,29-31(3,4)5)30-32(6,7)8)24(28)23(16-18)27-25-21-12-10-11-13-22(21)26-27/h10-14,16,19,28H,15,17H2,1-9H3 Key: HUVYTMDMDZRHBN-UHFFFAOYSA-N
- SMILES: CC(CC1=C(O)C(=CC(C)=C1)N1N=C2C=CC=CC2=N1)C[Si](C)(O[Si](C)(C)C)O[Si](C)(C)C; CC1=CC(N3N=C2C=CC=CC2=N3)=C(O)C(CC(C)C[Si](O[Si](C)(C)C)(O[Si](C)(C)C)C)=C1

Properties
| Chemical formula | C_{24}H_{39}N_{3}O_{3}Si_{3} |
| Molar mass | 501.849 g·mol^{−1} |
- Except where otherwise noted, data are given for materials in their standard state (at 25 °C [77 °F], 100 kPa). Infobox references

Drometrizole trisiloxane (INCI) is a lipophilic benzotriazole derivative marketed as Mexoryl XL by L'Oréal and is used in sunscreens to absorb UV radiation. It is a broad-spectrum UV absorber with two absorption peaks, one at 303 nm (UVB) and one at 344 nm (UVA). Drometrizole trisiloxane and ecamsule (Mexoryl SX) are often used together, because they show a synergistic effect in UV protection.

== Availability ==
Sunscreens with drometrizole trisiloxane are approved within the EU, Canada, Australia, Japan, and other countries, but not in the United States.

== See also ==
- Ecamsule (Mexoryl SX) – A UV filter often used with drometrizole trisiloxane
