= Ortho acid =

Hypothetical organic molecules of the form R–C(OH)3

In organic chemistry, ortho acids are organic, hypothetical chemical compounds having the structure R−C(OH)_{3} (R = alkyl or aryl).

Ortho acids themselves are unstable and cannot be isolated. However, ortho esters can be synthesized by the Pinner reaction, in which nitriles react with alcohols under acid catalysis:

RCN + 3 R'OH → RC(OR')_{3} + NH_{3}

== Historic definition ==
Historically the prefixes "hypo-", "per-", "ortho-", "meta-", and "pyro-" were used to distinguish between different oxyacids of the same element, of these ortho acid is the most highly oxidised or hydroxylated. For example, dehydration of orthoperiodic acid gives metaperiodic acid. Such naming conventions are now obsolete; however, various traditional names containing these prefixes have been retained in IUPAC nomenclature, namely:

- orthosilicic acid, Si(OH)_{4}
- orthotelluric acid, Te(OH)_{6}
- orthophosphoric acid, PO(OH)_{3}
- orthoboric acid, B(OH)_{3}

== Hypothetical chemical compounds ==
- orthoacetic acid, CH_{3}−C(OH)_{3}
- orthocarbonic acid, C(OH)_{4}
- orthoformic acid, HC(OH)_{3}
