= 1,3,5-Triazine =

1,3,5-Triazine
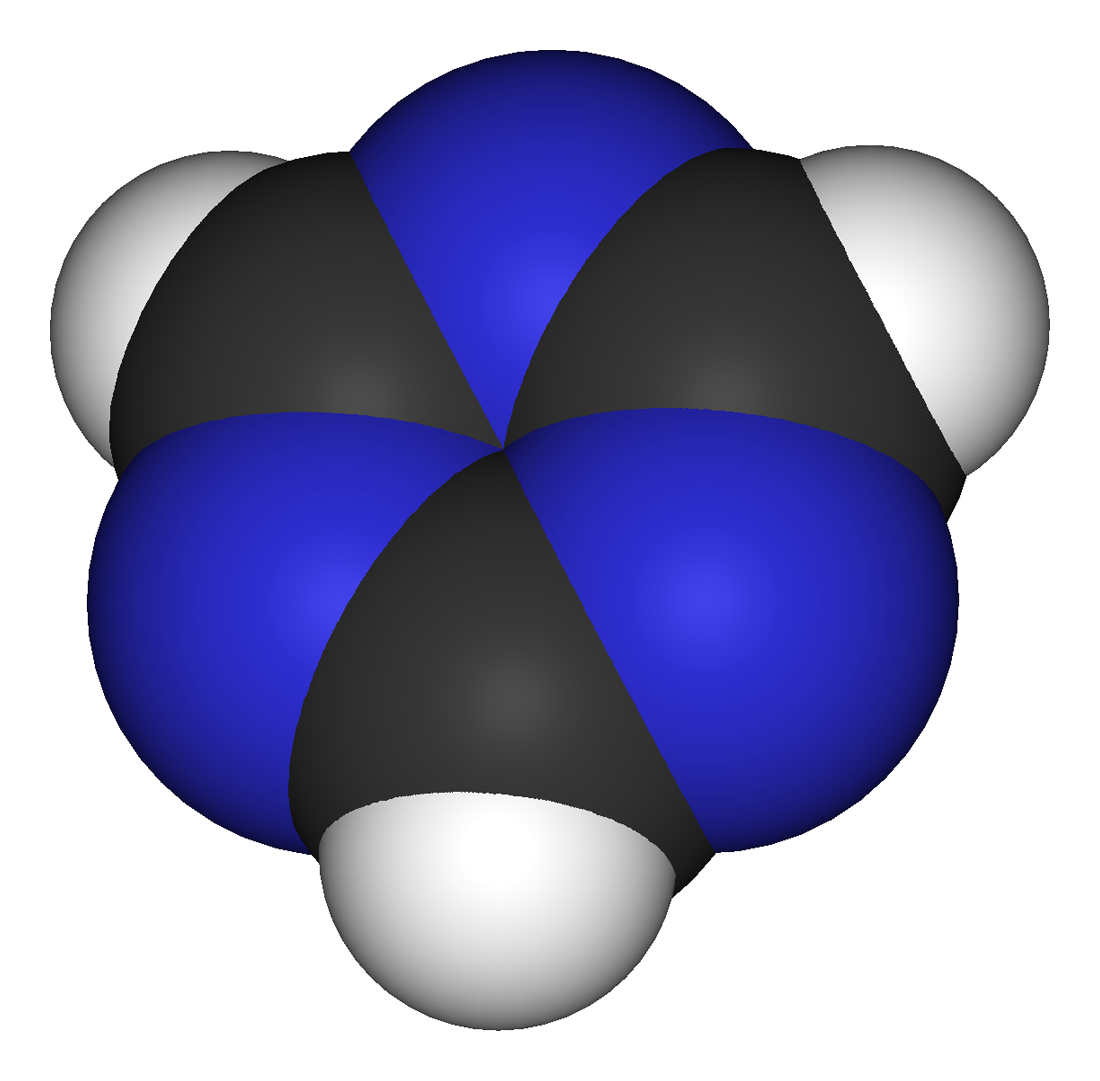
1,3,5-Triazine

Names
- Preferred IUPAC name 1,3,5-Triazine
- Other names sym-Triazine s-Triazine; Cyanidine; Hydrogen cyanide trimer Vedita

Identifiers
CAS Number	290-87-9
3D model (JSmol)	Interactive image
ChEBI	CHEBI:30259
ChEMBL	ChEMBL15698
ChemSpider	8905
ECHA InfoCard	100.005.481
EC Number	206-028-1
PubChem CID	9262
RTECS number	XY2957000
UNII	8B5F4CM81E
CompTox Dashboard (EPA)	DTXSID7052785
- InChI: InChI=1S/C3H3N3/c1-4-2-6-3-5-1/h1-3H Key: JIHQDMXYYFUGFV-UHFFFAOYSA-N; InChI=1/C3H3N3/c1-4-2-6-3-5-1/h1-3H Key: JIHQDMXYYFUGFV-UHFFFAOYAG
- SMILES: n1cncnc1

Properties
Chemical formula	C_{3}H_{3}N_{3}
Molar mass	81.08 g/mol
Appearance	White crystalline solid
Melting point	81 to 83 °C (178 to 181 °F; 354 to 356 K)

Structure
Molecular shape	planar
Dipole moment	zero

Hazards
- Occupational safety and health (OHS/OSH)
Main hazards	Sensitive to water
- GHS labelling
Pictograms	(GHS05: Corrosive) (GHS07: Exclamation mark) (GHS08: Health hazard)
Signal word	Danger
Hazard statements	H302, H314, H315, H335, H360
Precautionary statements	P201, P202, P260, P264, P270, P271, P280, P281, P301+P312, P301+P330+P331, P302+P352, P303+P361+P353, P304+P340, P305+P351+P338, P308+P313, P310, P312, P321, P330, P332+P313, P362, P363, P403+P233, P405, P501

Related compounds
- Except where otherwise noted, data are given for materials in their standard state (at 25 °C [77 °F], 100 kPa). verify (what is ?) Infobox references

1,3,5-Triazine, also called s-triazine, is an organic chemical compound with the formula (HCN)_{3}. It is a six-membered heterocyclic aromatic ring, one of several isomeric triazines. s-Triazine —the "symmetric" isomer—and its derivatives are useful in a variety of applications.

== Preparation ==
Symmetrical 1,3,5-triazines are prepared by trimerization of certain nitriles such as cyanogen chloride or cyanamide. Benzoguanamine (with one phenyl and 2 amino substituents) is synthesised from benzonitrile and dicyandiamide. In the Pinner triazine synthesis (named after Adolf Pinner) the reactants are an alkyl or aryl amidine and phosgene. Insertion of an N-H moiety into a hydrazide by a copper carbenoid, followed by treatment with ammonium chloride also gives the triazine core.

Amine-substituted triazines called Guanamines are prepared by the condensation of cyanoguanidine with the corresponding nitrile:

(H_{2}N)_{2}C=NCN + RCN → (CNH_{2})_{2}(CR)N_{3}

== Applications ==
As a reagent in organic synthesis, s-triazine is used as the equivalent of hydrogen cyanide (HCN). Being a solid (vs a gas for HCN), triazine is sometimes easier to handle in the laboratory. One application is in the Gattermann reaction, used to attach the formyl group to aromatic substrates.

=== Triazine derivatives ===
N- and C-substituted triazines are used industrially. The most common derivative of 1,3,5-triazine is 1,3,5-triazine-2,4,6-triamine, commonly known as melamine or cyanuramide. Another important derivative is 1,3,5-triazine-2,4,6-triol better known as cyanuric acid.

Cyanuric chloride (2,4,6-trichloro-1,3,5-triazine) is the starting point for the manufacture of many herbicides such as Simazine and atrazine. Chlorinated triazines are the basis of an important family of reactive dyes, which are covalently attached to cellulosic materials.

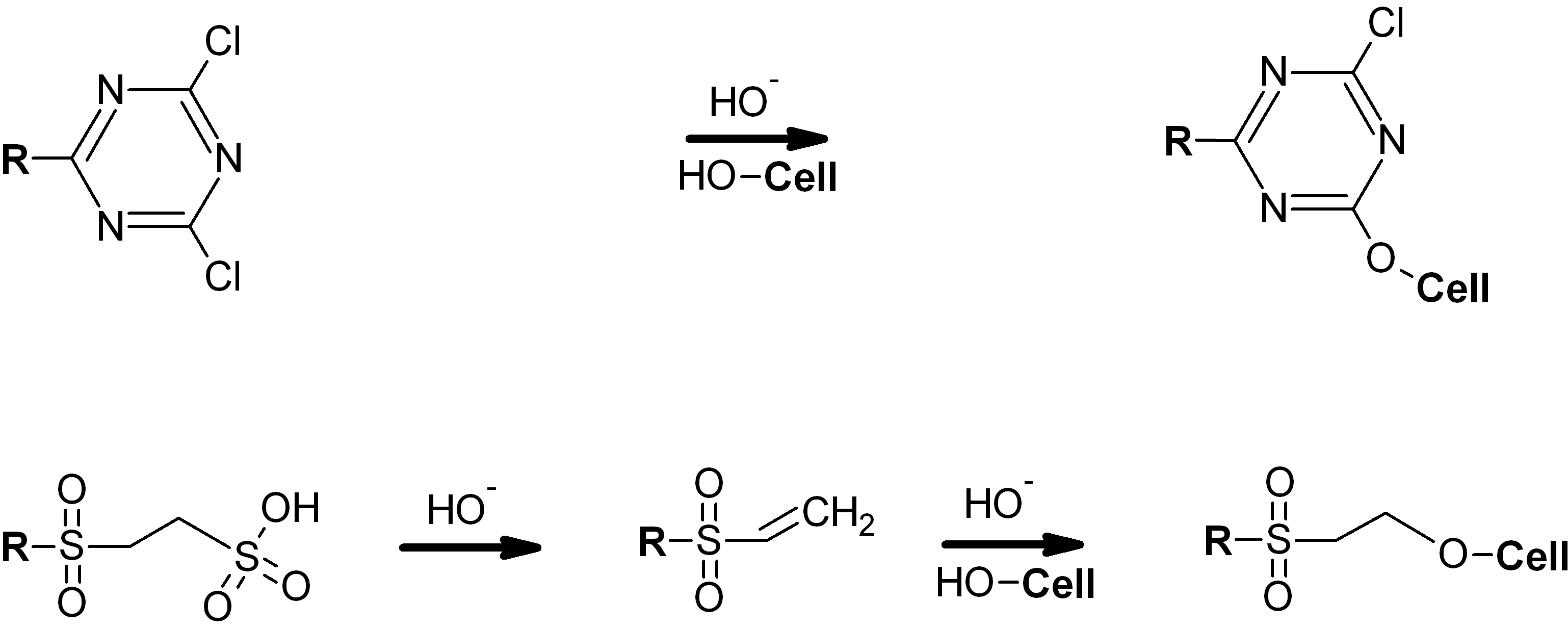
Methods for attaching reactive dyes to fibres (Cell = cellulose; R = chromophore).

Triazines are also found in pharmaceutical products.
