= Trimethyl orthoformate =

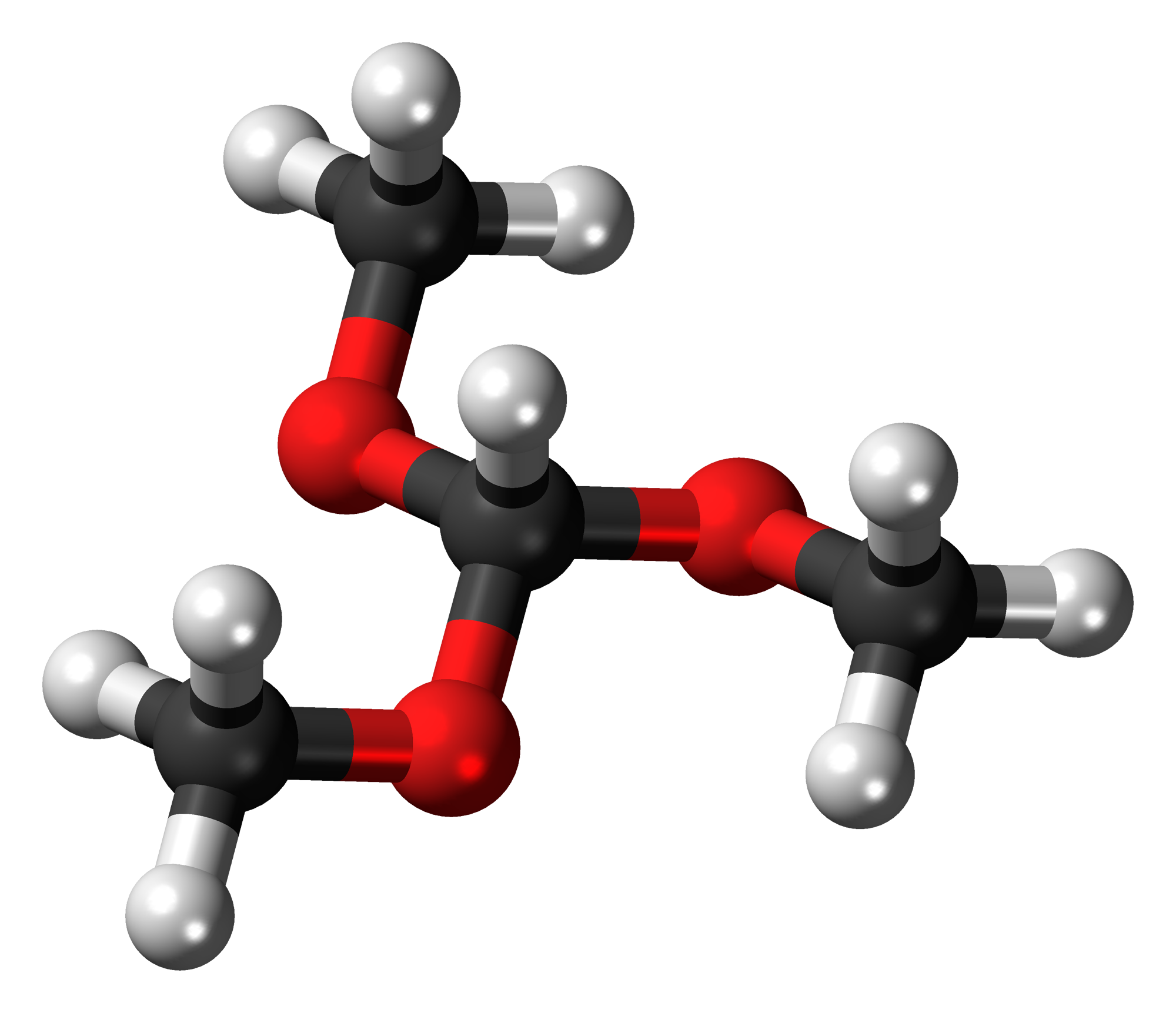

Names
- Preferred IUPAC name Trimethoxymethane
- Other names 2-Methoxyacetaldehyde dimethyl acetal Methoxymethylal; Methyl orthoformate

Identifiers
CAS Number	149-73-5
3D model (JSmol)	Interactive image
ChemSpider	8655
ECHA InfoCard	100.005.224
EC Number	205-745-7
PubChem CID	9005
UNII	XAM28819YJ
CompTox Dashboard (EPA)	DTXSID7027122
- InChI: InChI=1S/C4H10O3/c1-5-4(6-2)7-3/h4H,1-3H3
- SMILES: O(C)C(OC)OC

Properties
Chemical formula	C_{4}H_{10}O_{3}
Molar mass	106.121 g·mol^{−1}
Appearance	Colorless liquid
Odor	pungent
Density	0.9676 g/cm^{3}
Melting point	−53 °C (−63 °F; 220 K)
Boiling point	100.6 °C (213.1 °F; 373.8 K)
Solubility	soluble in ethanol, diethyl ether
Vapor pressure	1 kPa at 7 °C
Refractive index (n_{D})	1.3773

Hazards
- GHS labelling
Pictograms	(GHS02: Flammable) (GHS07: Exclamation mark)
Signal word	Danger
Hazard statements	H225, H315, H319, H335
Precautionary statements	P210, P233, P240, P241, P242, P243, P261, P264, P271, P280, P302+P352, P303+P361+P353, P304+P340, P305+P351+P338, P312, P321, P332+P313, P337+P313, P362, P370+P378, P403+P233, P403+P235, P405, P501
Flash point	13 °C (55 °F; 286 K)
- Except where otherwise noted, data are given for materials in their standard state (at 25 °C [77 °F], 100 kPa). Infobox references

Trimethyl orthoformate (TMOF) is the organic compound with the formula HC(OCH_{3})_{3}. A colorless liquid, it is the simplest orthoester. It is a reagent used in organic synthesis for the formation of methyl ethers. The product of reaction of an aldehyde with trimethyl orthoformate is an acetal. In general cases, these acetals can be deprotected back to the aldehyde by using hydrochloric acid.

== Synthesis ==
Trimethyl orthoformate is prepared on an industrial scale by the methanolysis of hydrogen cyanide:

HCN + 3 HOCH_{3} → HC(OCH_{3})_{3} + NH_{3}

Trimethyl orthoformate can also be prepared from the reaction between chloroform and sodium methoxide, an example of the Williamson ether synthesis.

== Use ==
Trimethyl orthoformate is a useful building block for creating methoxymethylene groups and heterocyclic ring systems. It introduces a formyl group to a nucleophilic substrate, e.g. RNH_{2} to form R-NH-CHO, which can undergo further reactions. It is used in the production of some fungicides (for example: azoxystrobin and picoxystrobin), as well as for some members of the floxacin family of antibacterial drugs.

A number of pharmaceutical intermediates are also made from trimethyl orthoformate.

Trimethyl orthoformate is also an effective reagent for converting compatible carboxylic acids to their corresponding methyl esters. Alternatively, acid-catalyzed esterifications with methanol can be driven closer to completion by employing trimethyl orthoformate to convert water byproduct to methanol and methyl formate.

== See also ==
- Triethyl orthoformate (triethoxymethane), another trialkyl orthoformate
- Other methoxymethanes
  - Methoxymethane (dimethyl ether)
  - Dimethoxymethane (methylal)
  - Tetramethoxymethane (tetramethyl orthocarbonate)
- Pinner reaction
- Trimethoxysilane, heavier analog, isoelectronic compound
- Tris(dimethylamino)methane, orthoamide analogue
