= Orthoacetic acid =

Chemical compound

- Skeletal formula of orthoacetic acid with all implicit hydrogens shown

Names
- Preferred IUPAC name Ethane-1,1,1-triol

Identifiers
CAS Number	463-83-2
3D model (JSmol)	Interactive image
ChemSpider	9128639
PubChem CID	10953422
UNII	Q40Q9N063P
CompTox Dashboard (EPA)	DTXSID101029654
- InChI: InChI=1S/C2H6O3/c1-2(3,4)5/h3-5H,1H3 Key: MAYUCBCSAVDUKG-UHFFFAOYSA-N
- SMILES: CC(O)(O)O

Properties
Chemical formula	C_{2}H_{6}O_{3}
Molar mass	78.067 g·mol^{−1}
- Except where otherwise noted, data are given for materials in their standard state (at 25 °C [77 °F], 100 kPa). verify (what is ?) Infobox references

Orthoacetic acid or ethane-1,1,1-triol is an hypothetical organic compound with formula C_{2}H_{6}O_{3} or H_{3}C-C(OH)_{3}. It would be an ortho acid with the ethane backbone.

Orthoacetic acid is believed to be impossible to isolate, since it would readily decompose into acetic acid and water. It may have a fleeting existence in aqueous solutions of acetic acid.

== Orthoacetate anions ==
The three hydroxyls of CH_{3}C(OH)_{3} could be deprotonated, leading successively to CH_{3}C(OH)_{2}(O^{–}) (dihydrogenorthoacetate), CH_{3}C(OH)(O^{–})_{2} (hydrogenorthoacetate), and finally CH_{3}C(O^{–})_{3} (orthoacetate).

== Orthoacetate esters ==
There are many stable organic compounds with the trivalent moiety H_{3}CC(OR)_{3}, which are formally esters of orthoacetic acid and called orthoacetates. They include trimethyl orthoacetate and triethyl orthoacetate, which are commercially available.

== See also ==
- Orthoformic acid
