= Feicheng Acid Chemicals =

Chinese chemical company

Feicheng Acid Chemicals Co., Ltd. 肥城阿斯德化工有限公司
- Industry: Chemicals
- Founded: 1994
- Headquarters: Feicheng, Shandong, People's Republic of China
- Key people: Sun Baoyuan (President)
- Products: Mainly formic acid and its derivatives
- Website: Feicheng Acid Chemicals

Feicheng Acid Chemicals (Chinese: 肥城阿斯德化工有限公司) is a chemical company based in Feicheng, Shandong, China.

The company was founded in 1994, with registered capital RMB 52.2 million. It is one of Chinese top 500 chemical industry enterprises and has established a "Postdoctoral Research Station" of national class and provincial "New Product Exploiting Center".

It is the largest producer of formic acid (100,000 metric tonnes per annum) outside Europe, owning over 10% of the world production capacity. (Formic acid is used as a preservative and antibacterial agent in livestock feed.)

== Products ==
The main products of Feicheng Acid Chemicals are:

Compound	Productions capacity (tonnes/annum)	% of worldwide capacity
Formic acid	100	14% (2009)
Methanol	50	0.006%
Methylamine	15	1%
Calcium formate	10	
Methyl formate	5	
Formamide	5	
Potassium methoxide	4	
Ammonium formate	2	
Carbon monoxide	200 000 m^{3}/annum	
