= Imidine =

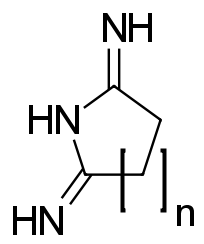
Chemical functional group, related to anhydrides and imides

In chemistry imidines are a rare functional group, being the nitrogen analogues of anhydrides and imides. They were first reported by Adolf Pinner in 1883, but did not see significant investigation until the 1950s, when Patrick Linstead and John Arthur Elvidge developed a number of compounds.

Imidines may be prepared in a modified Pinner reaction, by passing hydrogen chloride into an alcoholic solution of their corresponding di-nitriles (i.e. succinonitrile, glutaronitrile, adiponitrile) to give imino ethers which then condense when treated with ammonia. As a result, most structures are cyclic.

The compounds are highly moisture sensitive and can be converted into imides upon exposure to water.

== See also ==
- Amidine
- Guanidines
