= Orthoformic acid =

Hypothetical molecule with the formula HC(OH)3

- Stereo skeletal formula of orthoformic acid

Names
- Preferred IUPAC name Methanetriol
- Other names Orthoformic acid Trihydroxymethane

Identifiers
CAS Number	463-78-5
3D model (JSmol)	Interactive image
ChemSpider	4401409
PubChem CID	5231666
UNII	WIU6G972U6
CompTox Dashboard (EPA)	DTXSID50894118
- InChI: InChI=1S/CH4O3/c2-1(3)4/h1-4H Key: RLAHWVDQYNDAGG-UHFFFAOYSA-N; InChI=1/CH4O3/c2-1(3)4/h1-4H Key: RLAHWVDQYNDAGG-UHFFFAOYAS
- SMILES: OC(O)O

Properties
Chemical formula	HC(OH)_{3}
Molar mass	64.040 g·mol^{−1}
- Except where otherwise noted, data are given for materials in their standard state (at 25 °C [77 °F], 100 kPa). verify (what is ?) Infobox references

Orthoformic acid or methanetriol is a chemical compound with the formula HC(OH)_{3}. In this molecule, the central carbon atom is bound to one hydrogen and three hydroxyl groups.

Orthoformic acid was long held to be a hypothetical chemical compound, as it was expected to decompose instantly into formic acid and water, making it too unstable to isolate or observe. However, observation was shown to be possible in 2024, when it was identified by mass spectrometry. This involved the electron-irradiation of a frozen mixture of methanol and oxygen, and also carbon dioxide and water.

== Esters ==
Methanetriol esters, known as orthoformates or ortho esters, are well known and commercially available. Like acetals, they are stable towards bases but easily hydrolyzed in acidic conditions to the alcohol and an ester of formic acid. They are used as mild dehydrating agents. Especially well known are trimethyl orthoformate, triethyl orthoformate, and triisopropyl orthoformate.

== See also ==
- Methanol
- Methanediol
- Orthoacetic acid
- Orthocarbonic acid (methanetetrol)
