= Triethyl orthoformate =

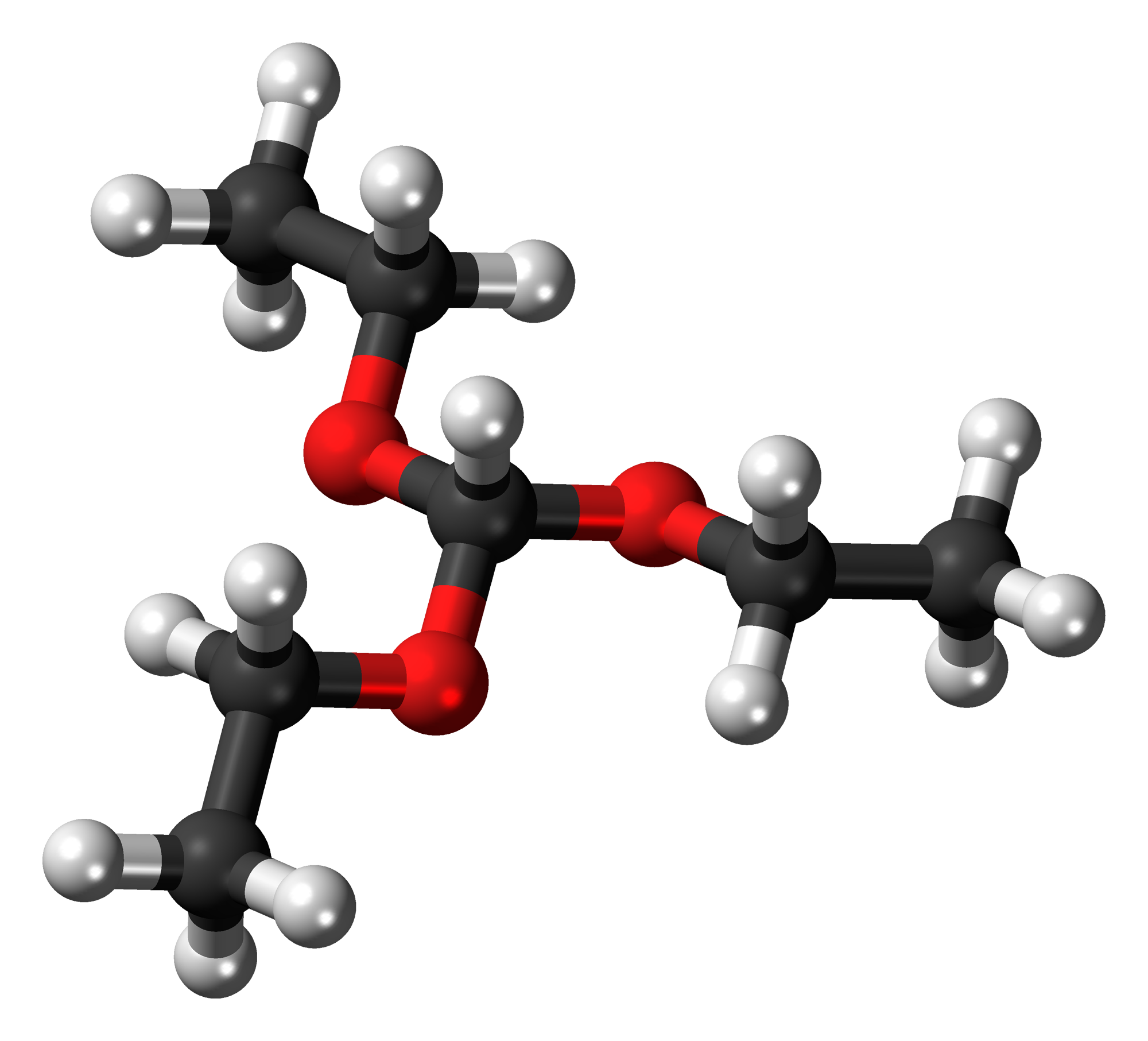

Names
- Preferred IUPAC name (Diethoxymethoxy)ethane
- Other names Triethoxymethane; Ethyl orthoformate

Identifiers
CAS Number	122-51-0
3D model (JSmol)	Interactive image
ChEMBL	ChEMBL1476236
ChemSpider	28955
ECHA InfoCard	100.004.138
EC Number	204-550-4
PubChem CID	31214
UNII	355LRR361Q
UN number	2524
CompTox Dashboard (EPA)	DTXSID8041957
- InChI: InChI=1S/C7H16O3/c1-4-8-7(9-5-2)10-6-3/h7H,4-6H2,1-3H3 Key: GKASDNZWUGIAMG-UHFFFAOYSA-N; InChI=1/C7H16O3/c1-4-8-7(9-5-2)10-6-3/h7H,4-6H2,1-3H3 Key: GKASDNZWUGIAMG-UHFFFAOYAW
- SMILES: CCOC(OCC)OCC

Properties
Chemical formula	C_{7}H_{16}O_{3}
Molar mass	148.202 g·mol^{−1}
Density	0.891 g/mL
Melting point	−76 °C (−105 °F; 197 K)
Boiling point	146 °C (295 °F; 419 K)

Hazards
- GHS labelling
Pictograms	(GHS02: Flammable) (GHS07: Exclamation mark)
Signal word	Warning
Hazard statements	H226, H315, H319, H335
Precautionary statements	P210, P233, P240, P241, P242, P243, P261, P264, P271, P280, P302+P352, P303+P361+P353, P304+P340, P305+P351+P338, P312, P321, P332+P313, P337+P313, P362, P370+P378, P403+P233, P403+P235, P405, P501
Safety data sheet (SDS)	Fischer Scientific
- Except where otherwise noted, data are given for materials in their standard state (at 25 °C [77 °F], 100 kPa). verify (what is ?) Infobox references

Triethyl orthoformate is an organic compound with the formula HC(OC_{2}H_{5})_{3}. This colorless volatile liquid, the ortho ester of formic acid, is commercially available. The industrial synthesis is from hydrogen cyanide and ethanol.

It may also be prepared from the reaction of sodium ethoxide, formed in-situ from sodium and absolute ethanol, and chloroform:

CHCl_{3} + 3 Na + 3 EtOH → HC(OEt)_{3} + 3/2 H_{2} + 3 NaCl

Triethyl orthoformate is used in the Bodroux–Chichibabin aldehyde synthesis, for example:

RMgBr + HC(OC_{2}H_{5})_{3} → RC(H)(OC_{2}H_{5})_{2} + MgBr(OC_{2}H_{5})
RC(H)(OC_{2}H_{5})_{2} + H2O → RCHO + 2 C_{2}H_{5}OH

In coordination chemistry, it is used to convert metal aquo complexes to the corresponding ethanol complexes:

[Ni(H_{2}O)_{6}](BF_{4})_{2} + 6 HC(OC_{2}H_{5})_{3} → [Ni(C_{2}H_{5}OH)_{6}](BF_{4})_{2} + 6 HC(O)(OC_{2}H_{5}) + 6 HOC_{2}H_{5}

Triethyl orthoformate (TEOF) is an excellent reagent for converting compatible carboxylic acids to ethyl esters. Such carboxylic acids, refluxed neat in excess TEOF until low-boilers cease evolution, are quantitatively converted to the ethyl esters, without need for extraneous catalysis. Alternatively, added to ordinary esterifications using catalytic acid and ethanol, TEOF helps drive esterification to completion by converting the byproduct water formed to ethanol and ethyl formate.

== See also ==
- Trimethyl orthoformate
