= Tetraethoxymethane =

Names
- Preferred IUPAC name (Triethoxymethoxy)ethane
- Other names Tetraethyl orthocarbonate

Identifiers
CAS Number	78-09-1
3D model (JSmol)	Interactive image
ChemSpider	59598
ECHA InfoCard	100.000.985
EC Number	201-082-2
PubChem CID	66213
UNII	W2P2570012
CompTox Dashboard (EPA)	DTXSID1075278
- InChI: InChI=1S/C9H20O4/c1-5-10-9(11-6-2,12-7-3)13-8-4/h5-8H2,1-4H3 Key: CWLNAJYDRSIKJS-UHFFFAOYSA-N
- SMILES: CCOC(OCC)(OCC)OCC

Properties
Chemical formula	C_{9}H_{20}O_{4}
Molar mass	192.25 g·mol^{−1}
Appearance	liquid
Density	0.919
Boiling point	159.5 °C (319.1 °F; 432.6 K)

Hazards
- GHS labelling
Pictograms	(GHS02: Flammable) (GHS07: Exclamation mark)
Hazard statements	H226, H315, H319, H335

Related compounds
Other cations	Tetraethoxysilane
Related compounds	Tetramethoxymethane
- Except where otherwise noted, data are given for materials in their standard state (at 25 °C [77 °F], 100 kPa). Infobox references

Tetraethoxymethane is a chemical compound which is formally formed by complete ethylation of the hypothetical orthocarbonic acid C(OH)_{4} (orthocarbonic acid violates the Erlenmeyer rule and is unstable in the free state).

== History ==
Tetraethoxymethane was described the first time in 1864.

== Synthesis ==
The preparation of tetraethoxymethane from the highly toxic trichloronitromethane is known in the literature and achieves only yields of 46-49 to 58%:

The obvious synthetic route from tetrachloromethane does not provide the desired product, as in the homologous tetramethoxymethane.

Starting from the less toxic trichloroacetonitrile (compared with trichloronitromethane), higher yields can be obtained (up to 85%). An alternative reaction, bypassing problematic reactants, is the reaction of dialkyltin dialkoxides with carbon disulfide at elevated temperature in an autoclave:

Another route reacts thallous ethoxide with carbon disulfide in dry methylene dichloride.

A more recent synthesis starts directly from sodium ethoxide, tin(IV)chloride, and carbon disulfide.

== Properties ==
Tetraethoxymethane is a water-clear, aromatic or fruity smelling, liquid of low-viscosity which is unstable against strong acids and strong bases.

== Uses ==
Tetraethoxymethane can be used as a solvent and for the alkylation of CH-acidic compounds (e.g. phenols and carboxylic acids). In addition, it reacts with amines, enol ethers and sulfonamides, whereby spiro compounds can also be obtained. Spiro orthocarbonates (SOCs) are of some industrial interest, as they are used as additives for reducing shrinkage during the polymerization of epoxides (they are used as expanding monomers).
