= C5H12O4 =

The molecular formula C_{5}H_{12}O_{4} (molar mass: 136.15 g/mol, exact mass: 136.0736 u) may refer to:

- Pentaerythritol
- Tetramethoxymethane
