= Expanding monomer =

Monomers which increase in volume

Expanding monomers are monomers which increase in volume (expand) during polymerization. They can be added to monomer formulations to counteract the usual volume shrinking (during polymerization) to manufacture products with higher quality and durability. Volume Shrinkage is in first line for the unmeltable thermosets a problem, since those are of fixed shape after polymerization completed.

== Background ==
The quality of thermosets (crosslinked polymers) is determined by a numerous factors such as the purity of the used monomer, polymerization time and temperature, stoichiometry of comonomers (when used) or type and quantity of catalyst or initiator. Another rarely minded factor is the volume shrinking (and density increase) during polymerization; actually all polymers are shrinking during polymerization to some degree. This volume shrinkage can lead (after the gel point) to mechanical stress within the polymer (internal stress), which may cause microfractures, worse mechanical properties or detaching form the substrate. Expandable monomers occupy after polymerization a greater volume than before and were designed to counteract the volumetric shrinkage upon addition. For other applications, like precision castings or dental fillings, a slight expansion during polymerization would be desirable for complete filling of a given mold. Nonetheless, for some applications even a small shrinkage can be desirable as for one-piece molds, to accomplish an easy removal. Expanding monomers are used to influence respectively control the volume change during the polymerization.

=== Reason for shrinkage ===
Shrinkage is observed during both, the polymerization and the crosslinking (curing) of monomers. This volume shrinkage is caused by various factors. The main reason is that the monomers are moving from an intermolecular van der Waals distance to covalent distance when a covalent bond is formed during polymerization. This can be emphasized for the example of the ethene polymerization.

It can be seen that the distance between to monomers changes from van der Waals distance (3.40 Å) to covalent distance of a single bond (1.54 Å), leading to a net change of -1.86 Å. The change from two double bonds (1.34 Å) to single bond (again 1.54 Å) results in a slight expansion (+0.2 Å each). Both effects added up are still resulting in substantial shrinkage.

A minor role is playing furthermore the entropy change while polymerization and the package density, as the polymer is more closely packed than the monomer. In step-growth polymerization (condensation reaction) small molecules are eliminated, which are also contributing to shrinkage when removed. At elevated temperatures also the thermal aging plays a role, where unreacted monomer can polymerize and degradation products and other small molecules are released.

=== Conventional methods for shrinkage reduction ===
Considerable research has been done to reduce shrinkage during polymerization. As methods the addition of fillers, the use of prepolymers, the addition of reactive diluents and special crosslinking agents are conventionally used. It is a general rule that the lower the reactive portion, the lower the shrinkage of the resin is during polymerization.

Fillers (silica, mica, quartz, etc.) are reducing the shrinkage in proportion to the used amount since the volume stable filler replaces the shrinking polymer. The viscosity increase which is caused by fillers is disadvantageous since it restricts the flow of resins and mold fill. Furthermore, problematic is their tendency of settling.

Prepolymers did undergo polymerization already to some extent. However, they are still viscous and not yet gelatinised. As prepolymers are already partially polymerized the shrinking is therefore reduced during the final cure. The higher the molecular weight of the used monomers the lower the shrinkage in volume.

Also the addition of reactive diluents can reduce the shrinkage in proportion to the extent of its addition.

== Concept of expanding monomers ==
=== Ring effects ===
Number of carbon atoms	Linear hydrocarbon density (g⋅cm^{−3})	Cyclic hydrocarbon density (g⋅cm^{−3})	Density difference
4	0.5788	0.6820	-0.1032
6	0.6603	0.7791	-0.1188
8	0.7028	0.8337	-0.1304
10	0.7310	0.8580	-0.1270

The expanding monomers were developed on the observation that the shrinkage during ring-opening polymerization is lower than in any other kind of polymerization:

ring-opening polymerization > chain growth polymerization > step-growth

This is mainly based on the fact that cyclic compounds are possessing higher densities than their linear counterparts. This can be illustrated by a comparison of cyclic and linear hydrocarbons (see table). A hypothetical ring-opening process of cyclobutane to n-butane would result in a volumen expansion of approximately 15%. The polymerization of a cyclic compound causes therefore a smaller volume shrinkage because cyclic compounds are already relatively dense.

It can be furthermore seen that the larger the ring, the larger the expansion. This first effect is called ring size effect. However, when the cyclic hydrocarbons would be hypothetically polymerized (to polyethylene), still a volume shrinking would appear overall (as polyethylene has a density of 0.92 g⋅cm-^{3}). Nevertheless, this shrinking would be reduced with increasing ring length.

However, for a real polymerization also the ring strain has to be kept in mind. The ring strain is reduced with increasing ring size and reaches near zero in cyclohexane. This can be illustrated with the fact that oxirane polymerizes readily while oxolane is by far less reactive.

A second effect is the ring per unit volume effect. The volume change during ring-opening polymerization is also influenced by the number of polymerizable rings per monomer. This can be illustrated for the example of cyclopentene, the cyclopentene dimer, adamantane and poly(cyclopentene). It can be seen that hypothetical conversion of cyclopentene to poly(cyclopentene) would result in volume shrinkage of 15.38%, while the conversion of cyclopentene dimer leads to expansion of 5.21% and the conversion of adamantane even to expansion of 14.15%.

The third effect is the ring-opening effect which can be illustrated at the polymerization of oxirane. During the polymerization two molecules are moving from van der Waals distance to covalent distance, what would result taken alone in shrinkage of approximately 40% (as it has been visualized above). At the same time the ring opens and moves from covalent distance to near van der Waals distance, this would result in an expansion of 17%. Thus, the overall volume change is a shrinkage of about 23%.

This minor shrinking during the ring-opening polymerization itself depends on the ring size effect, the number of rings per volume effect and the ring-opening effect.

=== Expanding monomer concept ===
Derived from the ring effects the design of the expanding monomers is based on bicyclic compounds. A net expansion is reached when for each bond which undergoes a shift from covalent to van der Waals distance at least two bonds are shifting from covalent to near van der Waals distance, as it is shown in the following picture.

It can be seen that bond a) and bond b) are broken and changing therefore from covalent to near van der Waals distance. At the same time is bond c) is formed between two monomers, which is a change from van der waals distance to covalent distance.

It follows the three requirements that the rings of the bicyclic monomer are fused (the rings are sharing at least one atom), that each ring contains at least one non-carbon atom and that the rings are opening in asymmetrical manner (meaning for example that one oxygen forms an carbonyl group and one an ether group). Compound classes which are fulfilling these requirements are spiro orthoesters, spiro orthocarbonates, bicyclic ketal lactones and bicyclic orthoesters.

== Overview, synthesis and polymerization ==
Most expanding monomers are orthoesters, either spiro orthoesters, bicyclic orthoesters or orthocarbonates. Some expanding monomers are lactones. These classes are listed in the following table.

Class of monomer	Structural formula
bicyclic orthoester	Structural formula of an bicyclic orthoester. This kind of monomer is used as expanding monomer.
cyclic carbonate	Structural formula of an cyclic carbonate. This kind of monomer is used as expanding monomer.
spiro orthocarbonate	Structural formula of an spiro orthocarbonate. This kind of monomer is used as expanding monomer.
spiro orthoester	Structural formula of an spiro orthoester. This kind of monomer is used as expanding monomer.
spiro orthocarbonate.	Structural formula of an unsaturated spiro orthocarbonate. This kind of monomer is used as expanding monomer.
unsaturated spiro orthoester	Structural formula of an unsaturated spiro orthoester. This kind of monomer is used as expanding monomer.
bicyclic monolactone	Structural formula of an bicyclic monolactone. This kind of monomer is used as expanding monomer.
bicyclic bislactone	

=== Synthesis ===
There are three possibilities given in the literature for the synthesis of expanding monomers which are based on orthoesters. The first possibility is the reaction of an epoxide with a lactone:

The epoxide cyclohexene oxide and the lactone γ-butyrolactone are reacting to the spiro orthoester spiro-7-9-dioxacyclo[4.3.0]nonane-8,2'1'-oxacyclo-pentane.

Also the reaction of an epoxide and a carbonate forming an spiro orthocarbonate is possible and described in literature.

The second possibility is transesterification:

2-Benzyl-1,3-propanediol and tetraethyl orthocarbonate are reacting to 3,9-bis(phenylmethyl)-1,5,7,11-tetraoxaspiro[5.5]undecane.

Also a condensation analogous to acetalisation reaction is possible.

An ethanediol derivate and γ-butyrolactone are reacting to a derivate of 1,4,6-trioxa-spiro[4.4]nonane.

The third possibility is using dibutyltin oxide and carbon disulfide:

1,3-propanediol is reacting with dibutyltin oxide to 2,2-dibutyl-1,3,2-dioxastannane and carbon disulfide to the cyclic sulfite of 1,3-propanediol. Both are forming together 1,5,7,11-tetraoxa-spiro[5.5]undecane

=== Polymerization ===
Most expanding monomers are cationically polymerized, some anionically and very few even radically. Spiro orthoesters are forming, when homopolymerized, polyether polyesters.

The reaction mechanism is not yet clear in details, as several side reactions are taking place. Expanding monomers can not just be homopolymerized as it is shown here but also copolymerized with other monomers to counteract their shrinking.

Usually a Lewis acid like boron trifluoride etherate is used for both, the synthesis of the orthoester and the polymerization. The same applies for spiro orthocarbonates and bicyclic orthoesters. All three are, in dependency of structure, very sensitive to moisture.

== Application ==
Expanding monomers are interesting for application as in matrix resins in radically polymerized dental fillings, high-strength composites (e. g. in epoxy resins), adhesives, coatings, precision castings, and sealant materials to counteract shrinking during polymerization. This can be necessary in case of dental fillings since polymerization shrinkage and subsequent contraction stress in the resin composite and at the bonding interface may lead to debonding, microleakage, post-operative sensitivity, a compromise in the material's physical properties and even cracks in healthy tooth structure. They are used in the other called applications to remedy similar problems.

In recent times the UV-induced photopolymerization of spiro orthocarbonates was point of investigation.
