= Formic acid (data page) =

Chemical data page

This page provides supplementary chemical data on formic acid.

== Material Safety Data Sheet ==
The handling of this chemical may incur notable safety precautions. It is highly recommend that you seek the Material Safety Datasheet (MSDS) for this chemical from a reliable source and follow its directions.

- MSDS from FLUKA in the SDSdata.org database
- Science Stuff

== Structure and properties ==
Structure and properties
Index of refraction, n_{D}
1.3714 at 20 °C
Abbe number
?
Dielectric constant, ε_{r}
58.5 ε_{0} at 16 °C
measured at 400 MHz
Bond strength
?
Bond length
C=O bond: 123 pm
C–OH bond: 136 pm
Bond angle
?
Magnetic susceptibility
?
Surface tension
37.67 dyn/cm at 20 °C
Viscosity

2.2469 mPa·s	at 10 °C
1.7844 mPa·s	at 20 °C
1.2190 mPa·s	at 40 °C
0.5492 mPa·s	at 100 °C

== Thermodynamic properties ==
Phase behavior
Triple point	281.40 K (8.25 °C), 2.2 kPa
Critical point	588 K (315 °C), 5.81 MPa
Std enthalpy change of fusion, Δ_{fus}H^{~~o~~}	+12.68 kJ/mol
Std entropy change of fusion, Δ_{fus}S^{~~o~~}	+45.05 J/(mol·K) at 8.25 °C
Std enthalpy change of vaporization, Δ_{vap}H^{~~o~~}	+23.1 kJ/mol
Std entropy change of vaporization, Δ_{vap}S^{~~o~~}	+61.8 J/(mol·K)
Solid properties
Std enthalpy change of formation, Δ_{f}H^{~~o~~}_{solid}	? kJ/mol
Standard molar entropy, S^{~~o~~}_{solid}	? J/(mol K)
Heat capacity, c_{p}	74.5 J/(mol K) at –22 °C; 82.8 J/(mol K) at 0 °C
Liquid properties
Std enthalpy change of formation, Δ_{f}H^{~~o~~}_{liquid}	–425.5 kJ/mol
Standard molar entropy, S^{~~o~~}_{liquid}	129.0 J/(mol K)
Enthalpy of combustion, Δ_{c}H^{~~o~~}	–254.6 kJ/mol
Heat capacity, c_{p}	101.3 J/(mol K) at 20–100 °C
Gas properties
Std enthalpy change of formation, Δ_{f}H^{~~o~~}_{gas}	–362.6 kJ/mol
Standard molar entropy, S^{~~o~~}_{gas}	251.0 J/(mol K)
Heat capacity, c_{p}	45.68 J/(mol K) at 25 °C

== Vapor pressure of liquid ==
P in mm Hg	1	10	40	100	400	760
T in °C	–20.0_{(s)}	2.1_{(s)}	24.0	43.8	80.3	100.6

Table data obtained from CRC Handbook of Chemistry and Physics, 44th ed. The "(s)" notation indicates temperature of solid/vapor equilibrium. Otherwise the data is temperature of liquid/vapor equilibrium.

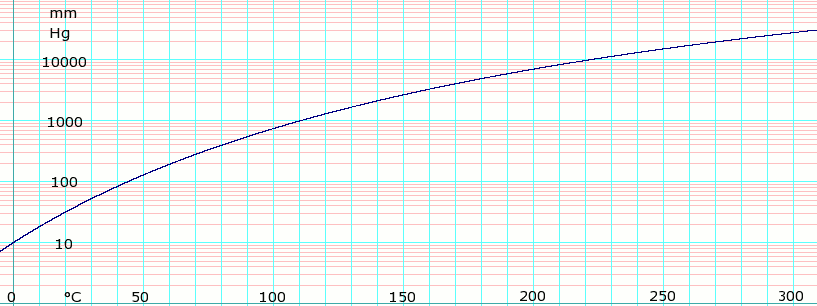
log_{10} of formic acid vapor pressure. Uses formula: $\scriptstyle \log_{10} P_{mmHg} = 6.94459 - \frac {1295.26} {218.0+T}$ obtained from Lange's Handbook of Chemistry, 10th ed.

== Distillation data ==
Vapor-liquid Equilibrium for Formic acid/Water; P = 760 mmHg
BP Temp. °C	% by mole water
BP Temp. °C	liquid	vapor
102.3	4.05	2.45
104.6	15.5	10.2
105.9	21.8	16.2
107.1	32.1	27.9
107.6	40.9	40.2
107.6	41.1	40.5
107.6	46.4	48.2
107.1	52.2	56.7
106.0	63.2	71.8
104.2	74.0	83.6
102.9	82.9	91.7
101.8	90.0	95.1

== Spectral data ==
UV-Vis
λ_{max}	? nm
Extinction coefficient, ε	?
IR
Major absorption bands	? cm^{−1}
NMR
Proton NMR
Carbon-13 NMR
Other NMR data
MS
Masses of main fragments

== Safety data ==
Formic acid
EINECS number	200-579-1
Safety data
EU classification	Corrosive (C)
PEL	5 ppm (9 mg/m^{3})
IDLH	30 ppm
Autoignition temperature	520 °C
Explosive limits	18–51%

This box:
- Except where noted otherwise, data relate to Standard temperature and pressure.
- Reliability of data general note.
