= Pinner triazine synthesis =

Chemical reaction

The Pinner triazine synthesis describes the preparation of 2-hydroxyl-4,6-diaryl-s-triazines by reaction of aryl amidines and phosgene. This reaction may be extended to halogenated aliphatic amidines.

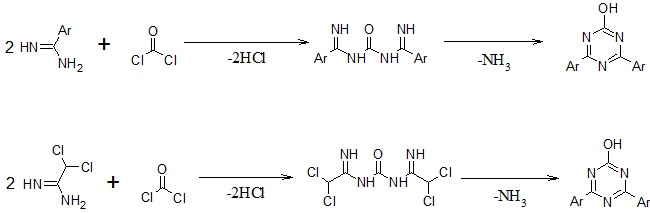

This reaction was first reported by Adolf Pinner in 1890
