= Potassium methoxide =

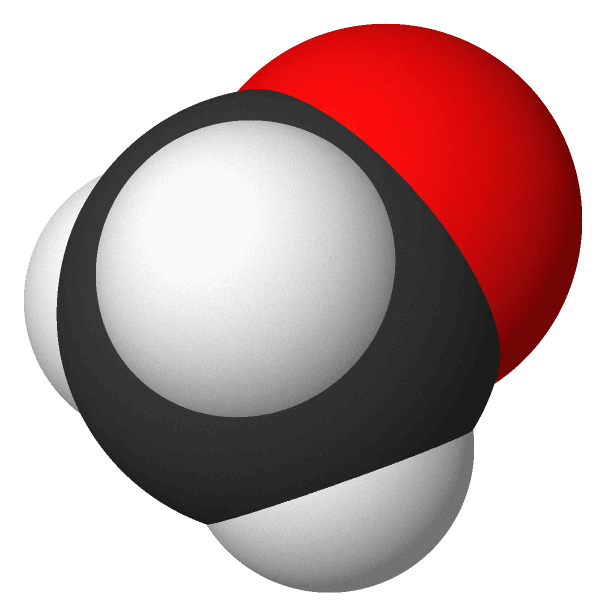

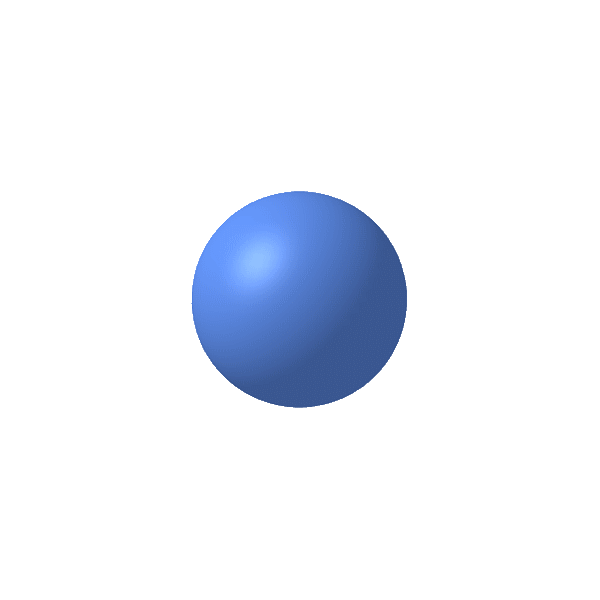

Names
- IUPAC name Potassium methoxide
- Systematic IUPAC name Potassium methylate

Identifiers
CAS Number	865-33-8 (hydrogen error)
3D model (JSmol)	Interactive image
Abbreviations	MeOK
ChemSpider	141079
ECHA InfoCard	100.011.579
EC Number	212-736-1
PubChem CID	23664618
UNII	45MYQ0GWGB
UN number	3206
CompTox Dashboard (EPA)	DTXSID1029627
- InChI: InChI=1S/CH3O.K/c1-2;/h1H3;/q-1;+1 Key: BDAWXSQJJCIFIK-UHFFFAOYSA-N; InChI=1/CH3O.K/c1-2;/h1H3;/q-1;+1 Key: BDAWXSQJJCIFIK-UHFFFAOYAD
- SMILES: [K+].[O-]C

Properties
Chemical formula	CH_{3}KO
Molar mass	70.132 g·mol^{−1}

Hazards
- GHS labelling
Pictograms	(GHS02: Flammable) (GHS05: Corrosive) (GHS07: Exclamation mark)
Signal word	Danger
Hazard statements	H228, H251, H290, H302, H314
Precautionary statements	P210, P234, P235+P410, P240, P241, P260, P264, P270, P280, P301+P312, P301+P330+P331, P303+P361+P353, P304+P340, P305+P351+P338, P310, P321, P330, P363, P370+P378, P390, P404, P405, P407, P413, P420, P501
- Except where otherwise noted, data are given for materials in their standard state (at 25 °C [77 °F], 100 kPa). Infobox references

Potassium methoxide is the alkoxide of methanol with the counterion potassium and is used as a strong base and as a catalyst for transesterification, in particular for the production of biodiesel.

== Preparation ==
The preparation of potassium methoxide can be achieved on the laboratory scale by the (strongly exothermic) reaction of metallic potassium and methanol upon the release of equimolar amounts of hydrogen.

2 K + 2 CH_{3}OH → 2 K^{+} + 2 CH_{3}O^{−} + H_{2}

The reaction of metal hydrides (potassium hydride) with methanol forming potassium methoxide is also possible but less important.

KH + CH_{3}OH → K^{+} + CH_{3}O^{−} + H_{2}

The exothermic reaction of potassium hydroxide with methanol leads in an equilibrium reaction to potassium methanolate and water (avoiding formation of highly inflammable hydrogen gas). In a continuous process the formed water must be removed permanently.

KOH + CH_{3}OH ⇌ K^{+} + CH_{3}O^{−} + H_{2}O

The complete removal of the water is critical for the reaction conversion, due to the pronounced hygroscopy of potassium hydroxide, which contains about 10% of water. The significantly higher dissolution rate of potassium hydroxide in methanol compared to sodium hydroxide is advantageous.

On a large scale, potassium methoxide is produced by decomposing potassium amalgam with methanol, which is produced by the chloralkali-electrolysis of potassium chloride by the amalgam process. Impurities of the resulting potassium methoxide in methanol with metallic mercury can be eliminated by ultrafiltration. Solid potassium methoxide is obtained by distilling off the methanol. Because of their simpler production and better handling for chemical purposes solutions of potassium methanolate (25% to 32% by weight) are preferably used, which were continuously withdrawn from the amalgam process.

The displacement of the amalgam process by the ecologically and economically superior membrane process for the preparation of the mass chemicals sodium hydroxide and potassium hydroxide will make this standard production process for the production of alkali metal alkoxides in future useless.

== Properties ==
Potassium methoxide is a white to yellowish, hygroscopic, odorless crystalline powder which reacts violently with water forming potassium hydroxide and methanol. The aqueous solutions obtained are highly basic and have a corrosive effect. The substance is classified as an inflammable solid with a spontaneous ignition temperature of 70 °C.

The human toxicity and ecotoxicity evaluation of potassium methoxide is based on the properties of the decomposition products potassium hydroxide and methanol during hydrolysis in the aqueous medium.

== Use ==
The carbonylation of methanol with carbon monoxide to methyl formate (methyl methanoate) is catalyzed by strong bases, such as potassium methoxide.

The main application of potassium methoxide is use as basic transesterification catalyst in biodiesel synthesis (as a 25–32% methanolic solution). Triglycerides of vegetable and animal origin are reacted with methanol in the presence of alkali metal methanolates to form the corresponding fatty methyl esters.

Potassium methoxide allows a facilitated formation of fatty soaps in comparison to the (lower-priced) sodium methoxide (here potassium salts of the fatty acids from the triglycerides) and higher yields are obtained with potassium methoxide. The optimum conditions for biodiesel production from canola oil are reported as being 1.59% by weight of potassium methoxide, a reaction temperature of 50 °C and a methanol/oil ratio of 4.5:1. The biodiesel yield is 95.8% with a fatty acid content of 0.75% by weight.

== Literature ==
- N.Y. Turova; E.P. Turevskaya; V.G. Kessler; M.I. Yanovskaya, eds. (2002), The Chemistry of Metal Alkoxides, Springer US, doi:10.1007/b113856, ISBN 978-0-7923-7521-0

== See also ==
- Methoxide
