= Ortho ester =

Chemical group with the structure RC(OR')3

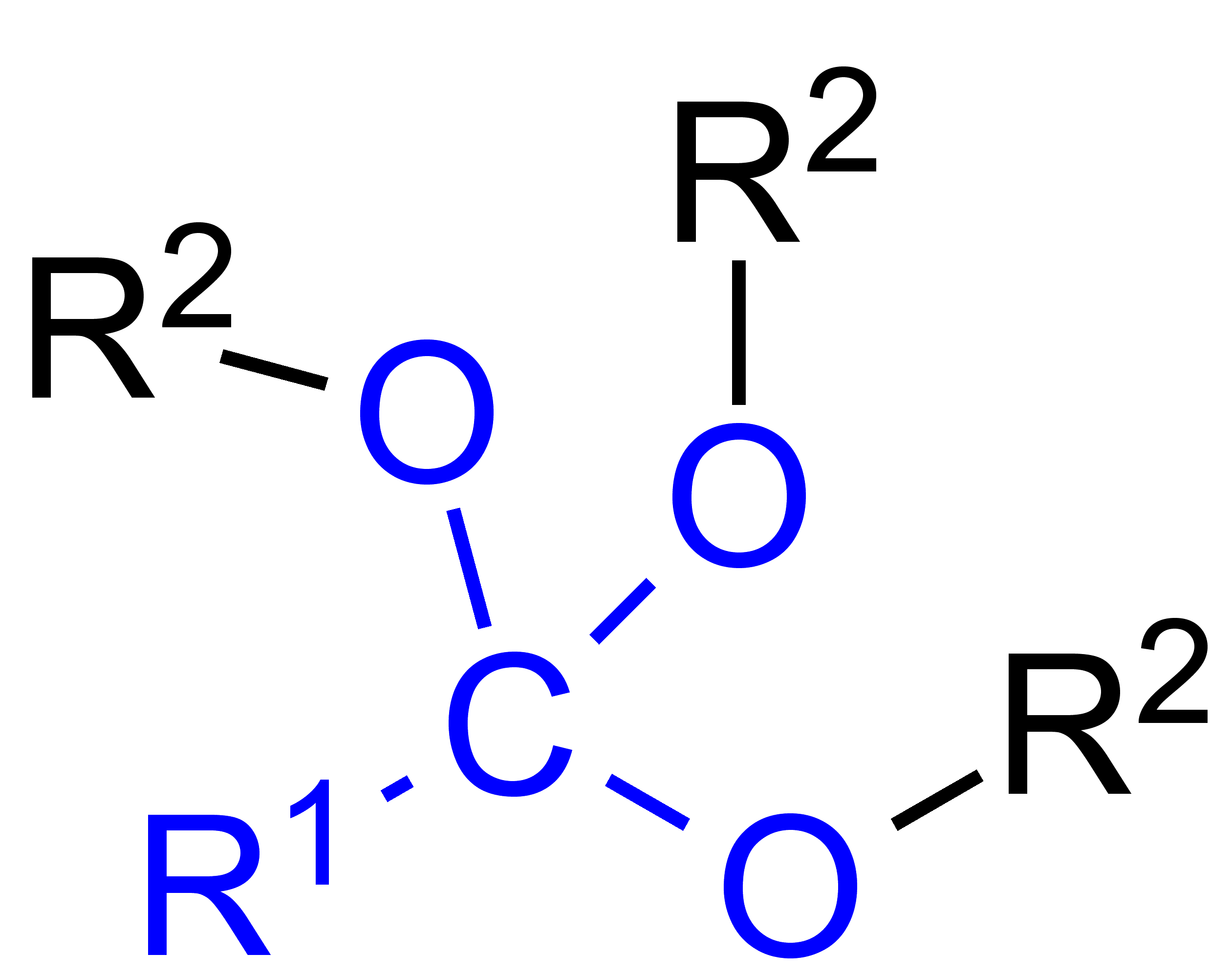
The general formula of orthoesters.

In organic chemistry, an ortho ester is a functional group containing three alkoxy groups attached to one carbon atom, i.e. with the general formula RC(OR')_{3}. Orthoesters may be considered as products of exhaustive alkylation of unstable orthocarboxylic acids and it is from these that the name 'ortho ester' is derived. An example is ethyl orthoacetate, CH_{3}C(OCH_{2}CH_{3})_{3}, more correctly known as 1,1,1-triethoxyethane. In total synthesis, bicyclic OBO ortho esters are used as protecting groups for carboxylic acids and esters.

== Synthesis ==
Ortho esters are traditionally, but inefficiently prepared through the Pinner reaction of nitriles and alcohols in the presence of one equivalent of hydrogen chloride. The reaction requires anhydrous conditions, and ideally a nonpolar solvent. It begins with formation of imido ester hydrochloride:

RCN + R′OH + HCl → [RC(OR′)=NH_{2}]^{+}Cl^{−}

Upon standing in the presence of excess alcohol, this intermediate converts to the ortho ester:

[RC(OR′)=NH_{2}]^{+}Cl^{−} + 2 R′OH → RC(OR′)_{3} + NH_{4}Cl

A major side-reaction converts the alcohol to the corresponding alkyl chloride.

Acid chlorides can also drive the reaction from the corresponding amide, e.g.:

HCONH_{2} + BzCl → HC(OBz)NH_{2}Cl
HC(OBz)NH_{2}Cl + ROH → HC(OR)_{3} + NH_{4}Cl + BzOH.

Although a less common method, ortho esters were first produced by reaction of 1,1,1-trichloroalkanes with sodium alkoxide:

RCCl_{3} + 3 NaOR′ → RC(OR′)_{3} + 3 NaCl

Compounds with an adjacent hydrogen atom on R tend to undergo elimination instead. Traditional esters can be converted to α,α‑dichloro ethers with phosphorus pentachloride. The resulting halogenated compounds undergo ether synthesis like the trichloroalkanes.

Carboxylic acids naturally form a trithio ortho ester when heated with a mercaptan of appropriate stoichiometry. The resulting compound undergoes transesterification to a traditional orthoester in the presence of zinc chloride.

Transesterification from a cheaper ortho ester is also possible; but performs best with unstabilized (electron-poorer) ortho esters. Stabilized ortho-esters tend to collapse to the corresponding non-ortho ester.

== Reactions ==
=== Hydrolysis ===
Ortho esters are readily hydrolyzed in mild aqueous acid to form esters:

RC(OR′)_{3} + H_{2}O → RCO_{2}R′ + 2 R′OH

For example, trimethyl orthoformate CH(OCH_{3})_{3} may be hydrolyzed (under acidic conditions) to methyl formate and methanol; and may be further hydrolyzed (under alkaline conditions) to salts of formic acid and methanol.

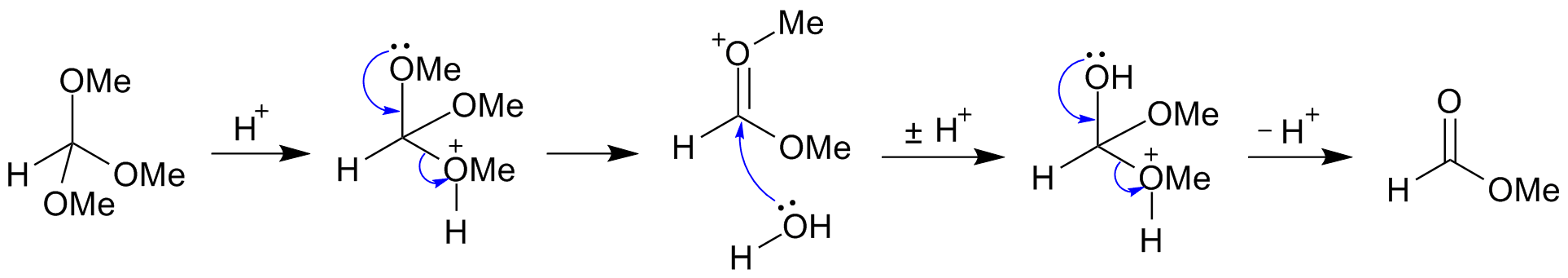

Adamantane-structured orthoesters, formally derived from all-cis-1,3,5-trihydroxycyclohexane, hydrolyze particularly slowly, for which reason they have been used as protecting groups.

=== Johnson–Claisen rearrangement ===
The Johnson–Claisen rearrangement is the reaction of an allylic alcohol with an ortho ester containing a deprotonatable alpha carbon (e.g. triethyl orthoacetate) to give a γ,δ-unsaturated ester.

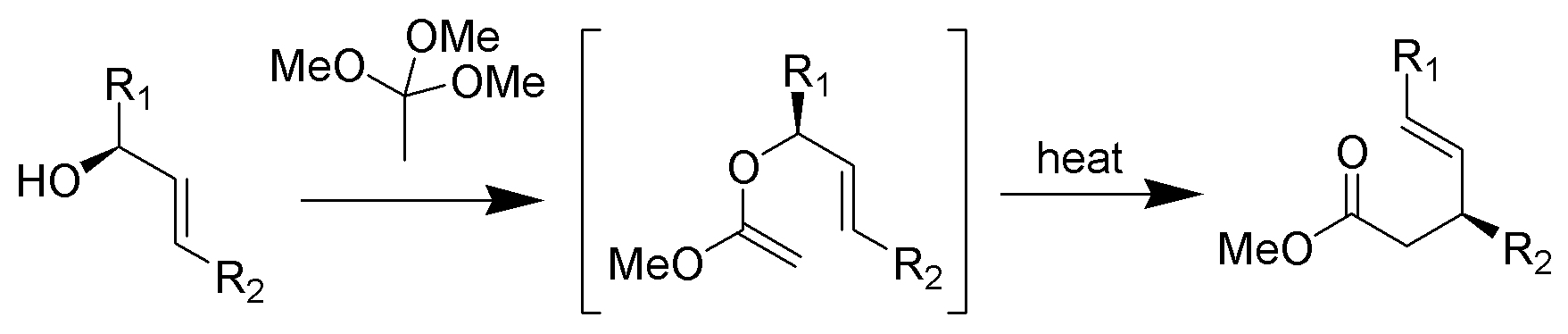

=== Bodroux–Chichibabin aldehyde synthesis ===
In the Bodroux–Chichibabin aldehyde synthesis an ortho ester reacts with a Grignard reagent to form an aldehyde; this is an example of a formylation reaction.

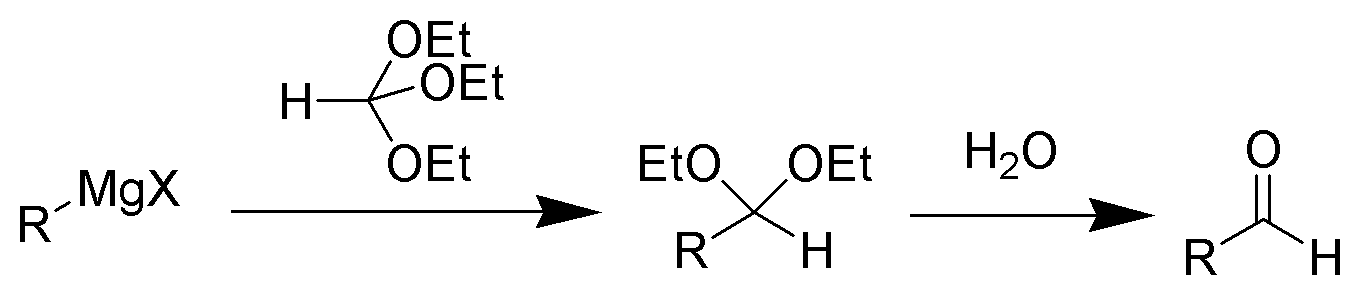

== Examples ==
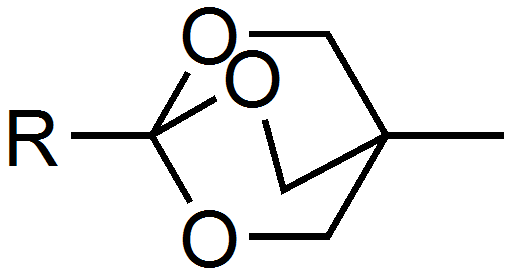
OBO: 4-methyl-2,6,7-trioxa-bicyclo[2.2.2]octan-1-yl

Examples of orthoesters include the reagents trimethyl orthoformate and triethylorthoacetate. Another example is the bicyclic OBO protecting group (4-methyl-2,6,7-trioxa-bicyclo[2.2.2]octan-1-yl) which is formed by the action of (3-methyloxetan-3-yl)methanol on activated carboxylic acids in the presence of Lewis acids such as BF_{3}. The group is base stable and can be cleaved in two steps under mild conditions. Mildly acidic hydrolysis yields the ester of tris(hydroxymethyl)ethane which is then cleaved using e.g. an aqueous carbonate solution.

The threefold symmetry of the cyclohexanehexol isomer scyllo-inositol (scyllitol) yields the triply-bridged orthoformate esters scyllitol orthoformate with an adamantane-like skeleton, and scyllitol bis-orthoformate with a diamantane-like skeleton.

Hygromycin B, an antibiotic, is one of several naturally occurring ortho esters.

== See also ==
- Acetal, C(OR)_{2}R_{2}
- Orthocarbonate, C(OR)_{4}.
