= Amidantel =

Identifiers
- IUPAC name: N-[4-[1-(dimethylamino)ethylideneamino]phenyl]-2-methoxyacetamide
- CAS Number: 49745-00-8
- PubChem CID: 39521
- ChemSpider: 26502044
- UNII: C67IS11N0O
- ChEMBL: ChEMBL2105966
- CompTox Dashboard (EPA): DTXSID70198009

Chemical and physical data
- Formula: C_{13}H_{19}N_{3}O_{2}
- Molar mass: 249.314 g·mol^{−1}
- 3D model (JSmol): Interactive image
- SMILES: CC(=NC1=CC=C(C=C1)NC(=O)COC)N(C)C
- InChI: InChI=InChI=1S/C13H19N3O2/c1-10(16(2)3)14-11-5-7-12(8-6-11)15-13(17)9-18-4/h5-8H,9H2,1-4H3,(H,15,17); Key:MKFMTNNOZQXQBP-UHFFFAOYSA-N

Amidantel is a pharmaceutical drug used in veterinary medicine. It is an anthelmintic active against nematodes, filaria, and cestodes.
