= Adolf Pinner =

German chemist (1842–1909)

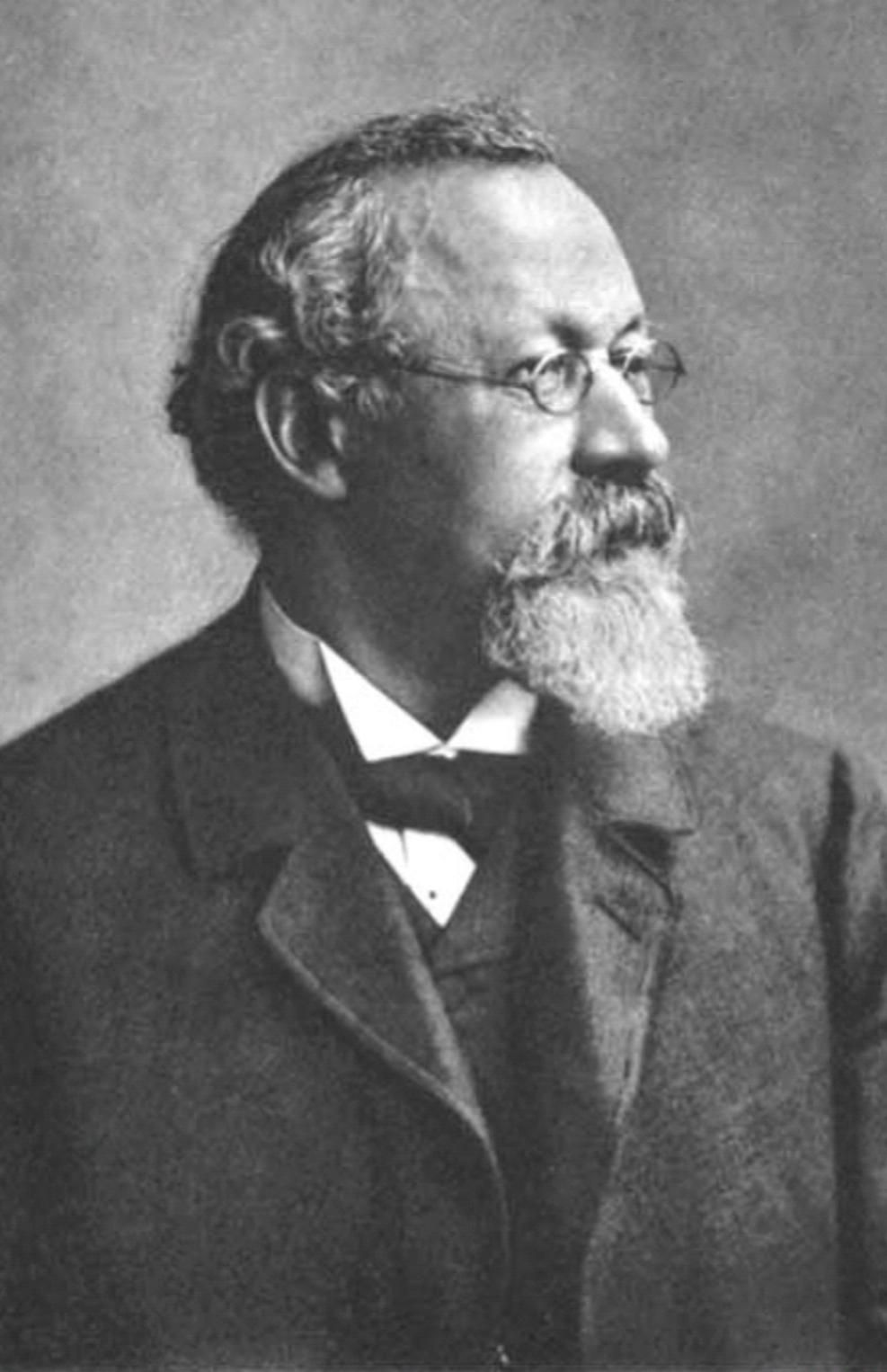
- Born: August 31, 1842; Wronke/Wronki, Posen, Prussia
- Died: May 21, 1909 (aged 66); Berlin, German Empire
- Known for: Pinner reaction Pinner triazine synthesis Imidines; Pyrimidine; Structure of nicotine
- Scientific career
- Fields: Organic chemistry
- Doctoral advisor: August Wilhelm von Hofmann

Signature
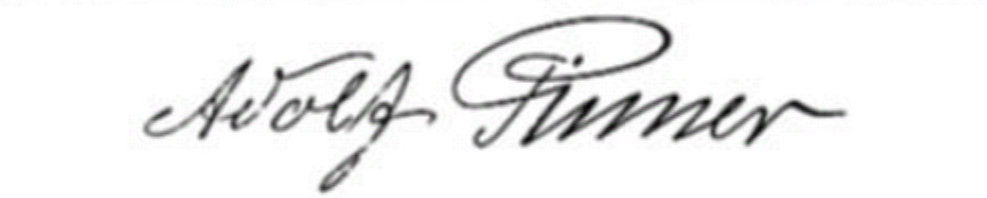

Adolf Pinner (August 31, 1842 – May 21, 1909) was a German chemist.

== Early life and education ==
He was educated at the Jewish Theological Seminary at Breslau and at the University of Berlin (Phd in Chemistry (Doctor der Chemie), 1867). In 1871, he became privat-docent at the University of Berlin. In 1873, he became assistant professor of chemistry at the University of Berlin, and in 1874 professor of chemistry at the veterinary college of that city. In 1884, he was appointed a member of the German patent office, and in the following year, of the technical division of the Prussian Department of Commerce. He has received the title "Geheimer Regierungsrat".

== Literary works ==
Pinner contributed many essays to the professional journals, among which may be mentioned:

- "Darstellung und Untersuchung des Butylchlorals," in "Annalen der Chemie", clxxix., and in "Berichte der Deutschen Chemischen Gesellschaft", 1870–77;
- "Ueber Imidoäther" in "Annalen", ccxcvii. and ccxcviii., also in "Berichte", 1877-97
  (which essays he combined in book form under the title "Ueber Imidoäther und Dessen Derivate");
- "Die Condensation des Acetons," in "Berichte", 1881–83;
- "Ueber Hydantoïe und Urazine," in "Berichte", 1887–89;
- "Ueber Nicotin", in "Berichte", 1891–95, and in "Archiv der Pharmazie", ccxxxi., ccxxxiii.;
- "Ueber Pilocarpin," in "Berichte", 1900–1903.

He is also the author of "Gesetze der Naturerscheinungen" and of "Repetitorium der Chemie", in 2 volumes, on organic and inorganic chemistry respectively (11th ed., Berlin, 1902). (Digital 4th edition from 1881 / Digital 6th edition from 1884 / Digital 11th edition from 1901 by the University and State Library Düsseldorf)

The latter work is well known to all German students of chemistry, and it has been translated into English, Russian, and Japanese.
