= Triethyl orthoacetate =

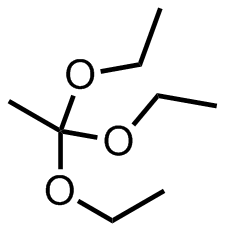
Skeletal formula of Triethylorthoacetate
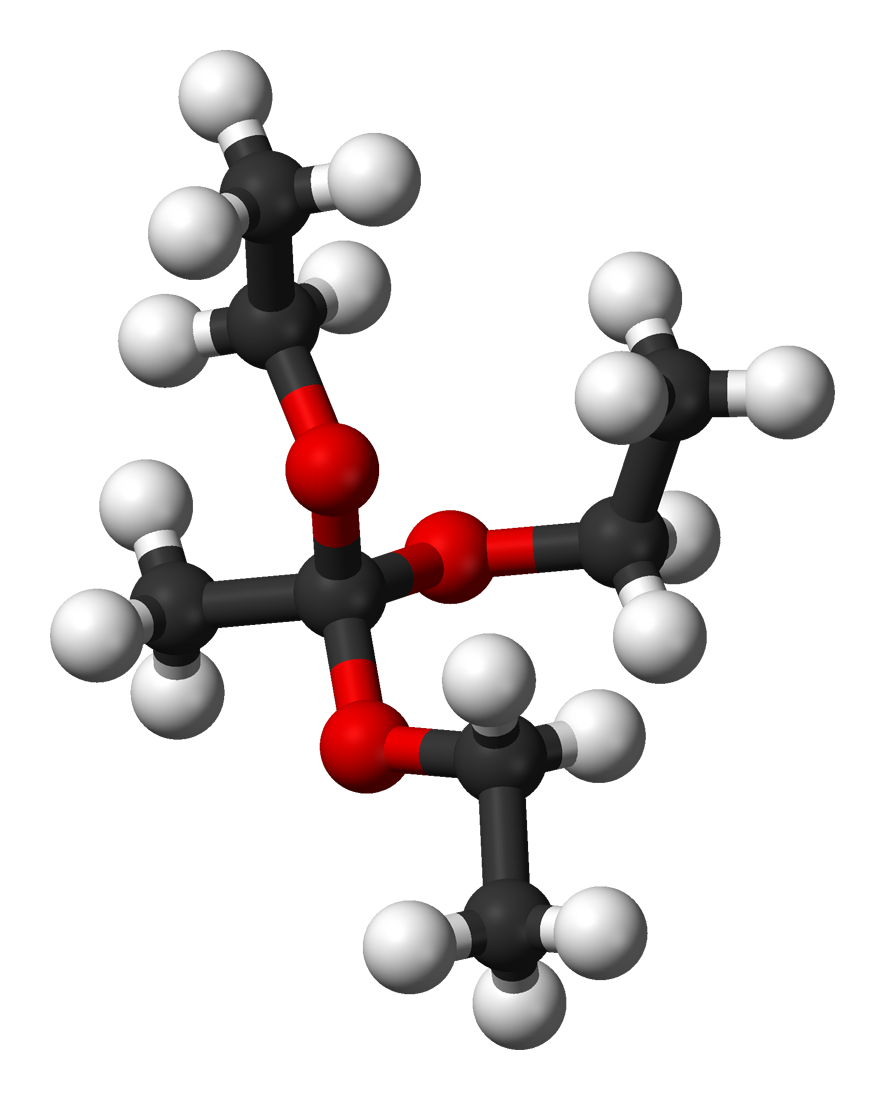
Ball-and-stick model of the Triethylorthoacetate molecule

Names
- Preferred IUPAC name 1,1,1-Triethoxyethane

Identifiers
CAS Number	78-39-7
3D model (JSmol)	Interactive image
ChemSpider	59606
ECHA InfoCard	100.001.012
PubChem CID	66221
UNII	48352MHC78
CompTox Dashboard (EPA)	DTXSID4058815
- InChI: InChI=1S/C8H18O3/c1-5-9-8(4,10-6-2)11-7-3/h5-7H2,1-4H3 Key: NDQXKKFRNOPRDW-UHFFFAOYSA-N
- SMILES: CCOC(C)(OCC)OCC

Properties
Chemical formula	C_{8}H_{18}O_{3}
Molar mass	162.229 g·mol^{−1}
Density	0.885 g/mL
Boiling point	142 °C (288 °F; 415 K)
- Except where otherwise noted, data are given for materials in their standard state (at 25 °C [77 °F], 100 kPa). verify (what is ?) Infobox references

Triethyl orthoacetate is the organic compound with the formula CH_{3}C(OC_{2}H_{5})_{3}. It is the ethyl orthoester of acetic acid. It is a colorless oily liquid.

Triethyl orthoacetate is used in organic synthesis for acetylation.

It is also used in the Johnson-Claisen rearrangement.
