= Tetramethoxymethane =

Names
- Preferred IUPAC name Tetramethoxymethane
- Other names Tetramethyl orthocarbonate

Identifiers
CAS Number	1850-14-2
3D model (JSmol)	Interactive image
Abbreviations	(MeO)_{4}C
ChemSpider	67188
ECHA InfoCard	100.015.853
EC Number	217-438-5
PubChem CID	74613
UNII	FHC4GZ2SYJ
UN number	3272
CompTox Dashboard (EPA)	DTXSID70171695
- InChI: InChI=1S/C5H12O4/c1-6-5(7-2,8-3)9-4/h1-4H3 Key: AHJWSRRHTXRLAQ-UHFFFAOYSA-N
- SMILES: COC(OC)(OC)OC

Properties
Chemical formula	C_{5}H_{12}O_{4}
Molar mass	136.147 g·mol^{−1}
Appearance	colourless liquid
Density	1.023 g/cm^{3} (25 °C)
Melting point	−5.5 °C
Boiling point	114 °C

Hazards
- GHS labelling
Pictograms	(GHS02: Flammable) (GHS07: Exclamation mark)
Signal word	Danger
Hazard statements	H225, H315, H319, H335
Precautionary statements	P210, P261, P305+P351+P338

Related compounds
Other cations	Tetramethoxysilane
Related compounds	Tetraethoxymethane
- Except where otherwise noted, data are given for materials in their standard state (at 25 °C [77 °F], 100 kPa). Infobox references

Tetramethoxymethane is a chemical compound which is formally formed by complete methylation of the hypothetical orthocarbonic acid C(OH)_{4}.

== Preparation ==
The obvious synthetic route from the tetrahalomethanes does not yield the desired product, instead giving orthoformates and a halohydrin byproduct. The original preparation of the tetramethoxymethane was therefore based on chloropicrin:

Because of the extreme toxicity of chloropicrin, other tetrasubstituted reactive methane derivatives were investigated as starting material for tetramethoxymethane. For example, trichloromethanesulfenyl chloride (also used as a chemical warfare agent and easily accessible from carbon disulfide and chlorine) was used:

A less problematic synthesis is based on trichloroacetonitrile:

Thallium methoxide reacts with carbon disulfide to give tetramethoxymethane and thallium sulfide; likewise dimethyl dibutylstannate gives tetramethoxymethane and dibutyltin sulfide. Further preparative methods are described in the literature.

Synthesis from chloropicrin only yields about 50% product. Syntheses from trichloromethanesulfenyl chloride or trichloroacetonitrile or the thallium-sulfide route yield about 70-80% product, but the tin-sulfide synthesis has a 95% yield.

== Properties ==
Tetramethoxymethane is a clear, colorless, aromatic-smelling, low-viscosity liquid which is stable against peroxide formation.

== Use ==
In addition to its use as a solvent, tetramethoxymethane is also used as a fuel in polymer fuel cells, as an alkylating agent at elevated temperatures (180-200 °C), as a transesterification reagent (but showing less reactivity than trimethoxymethane), and as a reagent for the synthesis of 2-aminobenzoxazoles, which are used as molecular building blocks in pharmaceutical active ingredients used in neuroleptics, sedatives, antiemetics, muscle relaxants, fungicides and others.

Depending on the substituents, the one pot reaction proceeds in "modest to excellent" yields.
