= Pinner reaction =

Reaction of cyanide and alcohol to give imino ester salt

Named after	Adolf Pinner

Identifiers
Organic Chemistry Portal	pinner-reaction
RSC ontology ID	RXNO:0000361

The Pinner reaction refers to the acid catalysed reaction of a nitrile with an alcohol to form an imino ester salt (alkyl imidate salt); this is sometimes referred to as a Pinner salt. The reaction is named after Adolf Pinner, who first described it in 1877. Pinner salts are themselves reactive and undergo additional nucleophilic additions to give various useful products:

- With an excess of alcohol to form an orthoester
- With ammonia or an amine to form an amidine (di-nitriles may form imidines, for instance succinimidine from succinonitrile)
- With water to form an ester
- With hydrogen sulfide to form a thionoester

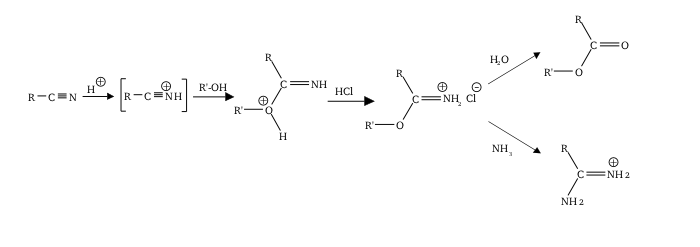

Commonly, the Pinner salt itself is not isolated, with the reaction being continued to give the desired functional group (orthoester etc.) in one go. The imidium chloride salt is thermodynamically unstable, and low temperatures help prevent elimination to an amide and alkyl chloride.

It should be appreciated that the Pinner reaction refers specifically to an acid catalyzed process, but that similar results can often be achieved using base catalysis. The two approaches can be complementary, with nitriles which are unreactive under acid conditions often giving better results in the presence of base, and vice versa. The determining factor is typically how electron-rich or -poor the nitrile is. For example, an electron-poor nitrile is a good electrophile, readily susceptible to attack by alkoxide bases, whereas an electron-rich nitrile would typically be easier to protonate, facilitating the acid-catalyzed reaction.

== See also ==
- Hoesch reaction
- Overman rearrangement
- Isocyanide
- Imidoyl chloride
- Stephen aldehyde synthesis – essentially the same reaction but including a reduction and with water as the nucleophile; generates the aldehyde.
