= Amidine =

Organic compounds

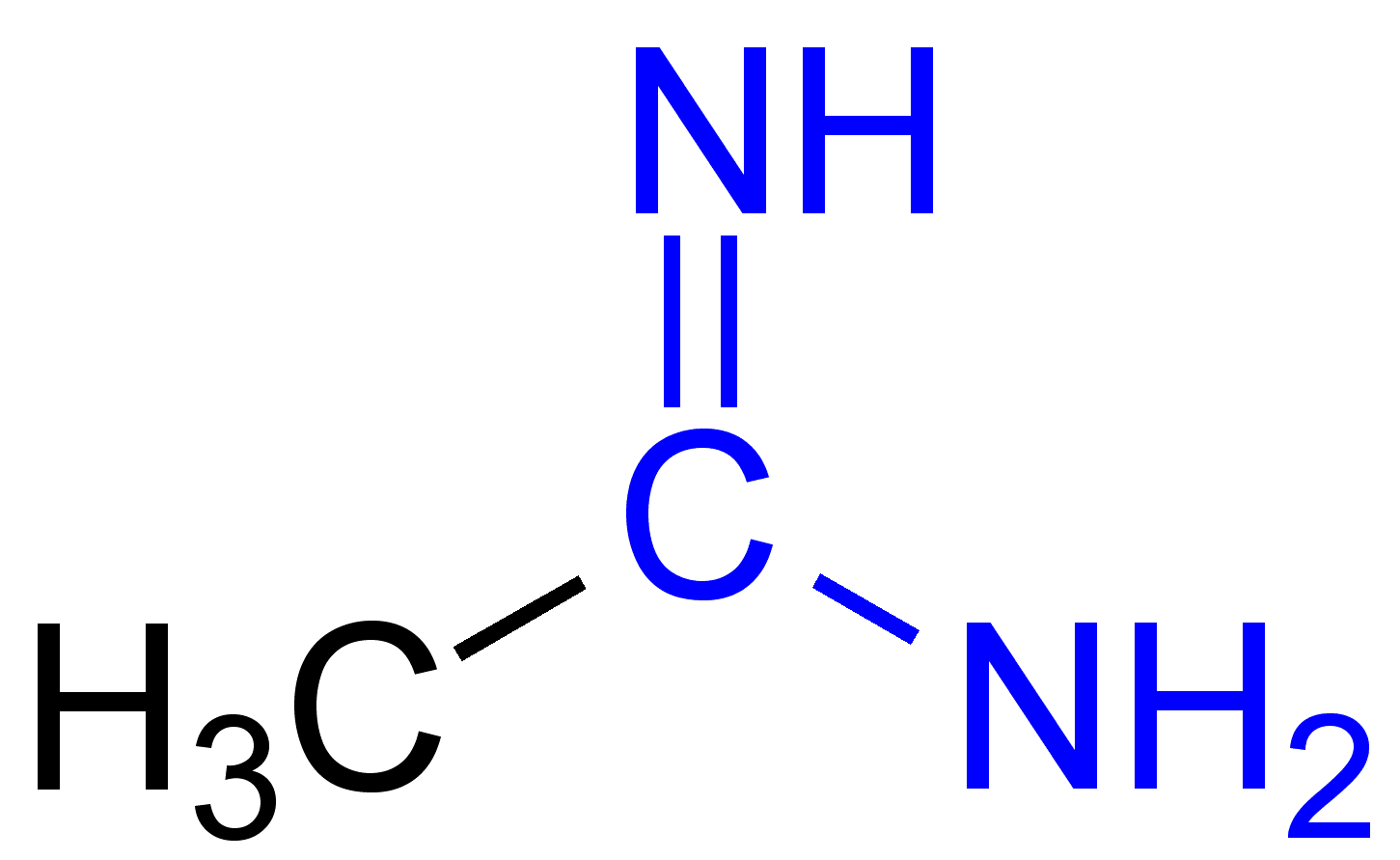
The structural formula of acetamidine (acetimidamide).

Amidines are organic compounds with the functional group RC(NR)NR_{2}, where the R groups can be the same or different. They are the imine derivatives of amides (RC(O)NR_{2}). The simplest amidine is formamidine, HC(=NH)NH_{2}.

Examples of amidines include:

- DBU
- diminazene
- benzamidine
- Pentamidine
- Paranyline

== Preparation ==
A common route to primary amidines is the Pinner reaction. Reaction of the nitrile with alcohol in the presence of acid gives an iminoether. Treatment of the resulting compound with ammonia then completes the conversion to the amidine. Instead of using a Bronsted acid, Lewis acids such as aluminium trichloride promote the direct amination of nitriles, or, in certain exceptional cases, of amides.

Catalysis is not required for direct amination of an imidoyl chloride. Likewise, dimethylformamide acetal reacts with primary amines to give amidines:

Me_{2}NC(H)(OMe)_{2} + RNH_{2} → Me_{2}NC=NHR + 2 MeOH

Monoformamides react with isocyanates to give formamidines and carbon dioxide, presumably via rearrangement of the imide.

Amidines are also prepared by the addition of organolithium reagents to carbodiimides, followed by protonation or alkylation.

== Acid-base chemistry ==
Amidines are much more basic than amides and are among the strongest uncharged/unionized bases.

Protonation occurs at the sp^{2}-hybridized nitrogen. This occurs because the positive charge can be delocalized onto both nitrogen atoms. The resulting cationic species is known as an amidinium ion and possesses identical C-N bond lengths.

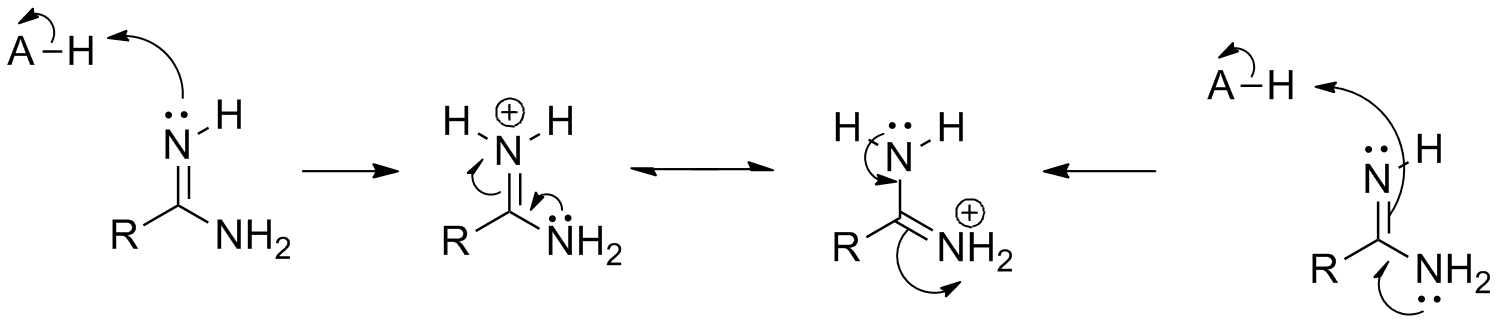

== Applications ==
Several drug or drug candidates feature amidine substituents. Examples include the antiprotozoal imidocarb, the insecticide amitraz, xylamidine, an antagonist at the 5HT2A receptor, and the anthelmintics amidantel and tribendimidine.

Formamidinium (see below) may be reacted with a metal halide to form the light-absorbing semiconducting material in perovskite solar cells. Formamidinium (FA) cations or halides may partially or fully replace methylammonium halides in forming perovskite absorber layers in photovoltaic devices.

== Nomenclature ==
Formally, amidines are a class of oxoacids. The oxoacid from which an amidine is derived must be of the form R_{n}E(=O)OH, where R is a substituent. The −OH group is replaced by an −NH_{2} group and the =O group is replaced by =NR, giving amidines the general structure R_{n}E(=NR)NR_{2}. When the parent oxoacid is a carboxylic acid, the resulting amidine is a carboxamidine or carboximidamide (IUPAC name). Carboxamidines are frequently referred to simply as amidines, as they are the most commonly encountered type of amidine in organic chemistry.

== Derivatives ==
=== Formamidinium cations ===
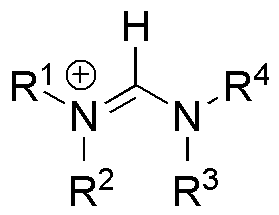
general structure of a formamidinium cation

A notable subclass of amidinium ions are the formamidinium cations; which can be represented by the chemical formula [R_{2}N−CH=NR_{2}]^{+}. Deprotonation of these gives stable carbenes which can be represented by the chemical formula R_{2}N−C:−NR_{2}.

=== Amidinate salts ===
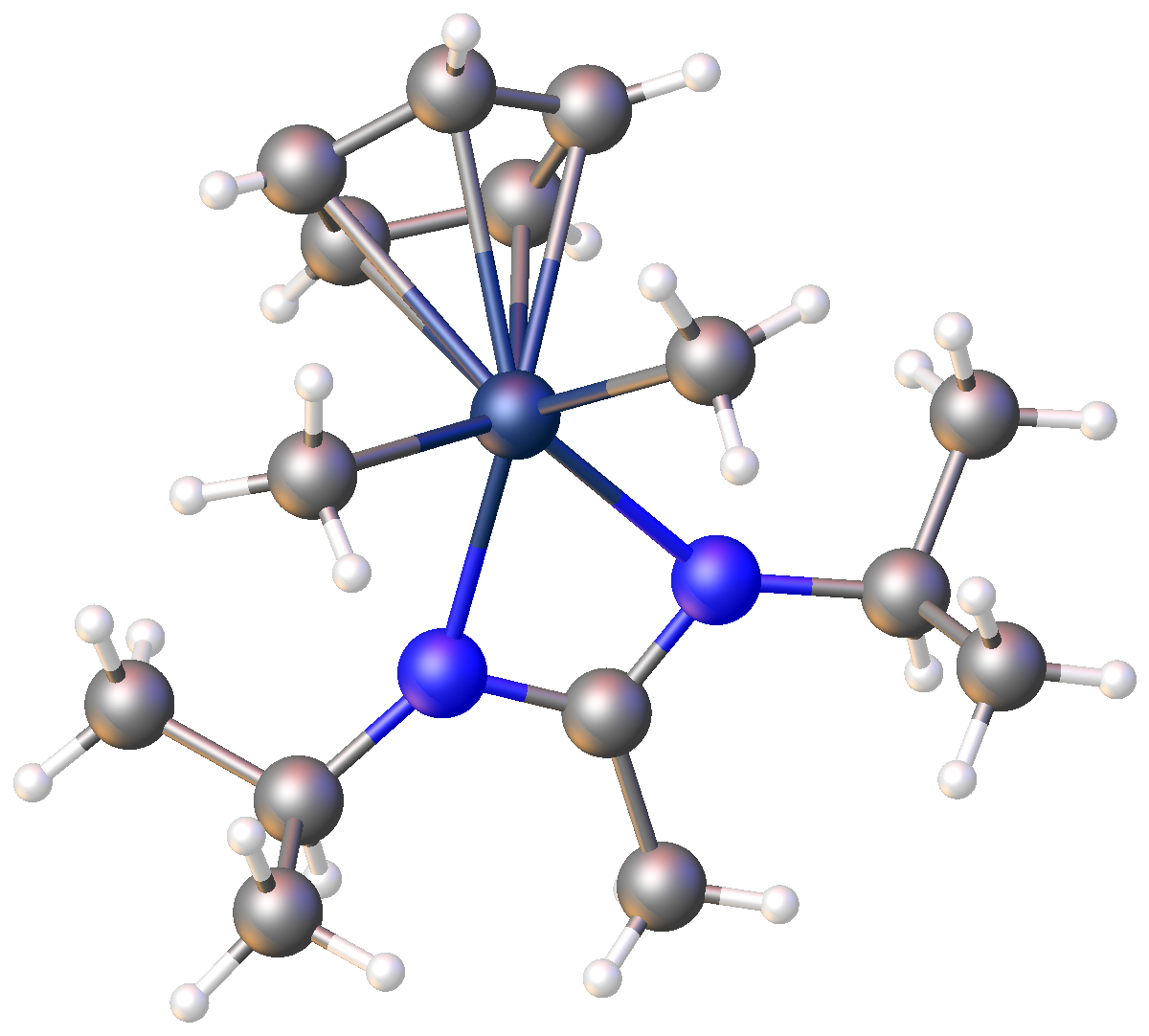
Structure of cyclopentadienyl dimethyl zirconium (diisopropyl acetamidinate).

An amidinate salt has the general structure M^{+}[RNRCNR]^{−} and can be accessed by reaction of a carbodiimide with an organometallic compound such as methyl lithium. They are used widely as ligands in organometallic complexes.

== See also ==
- Guanidines — a similar group of compounds where the central carbon atom is bonded to three nitrogen atoms.
- Imidazolines contain a cyclic amidine.
