= Orthocarbonic acid =

Hypothetical compound with formula C(OH)4

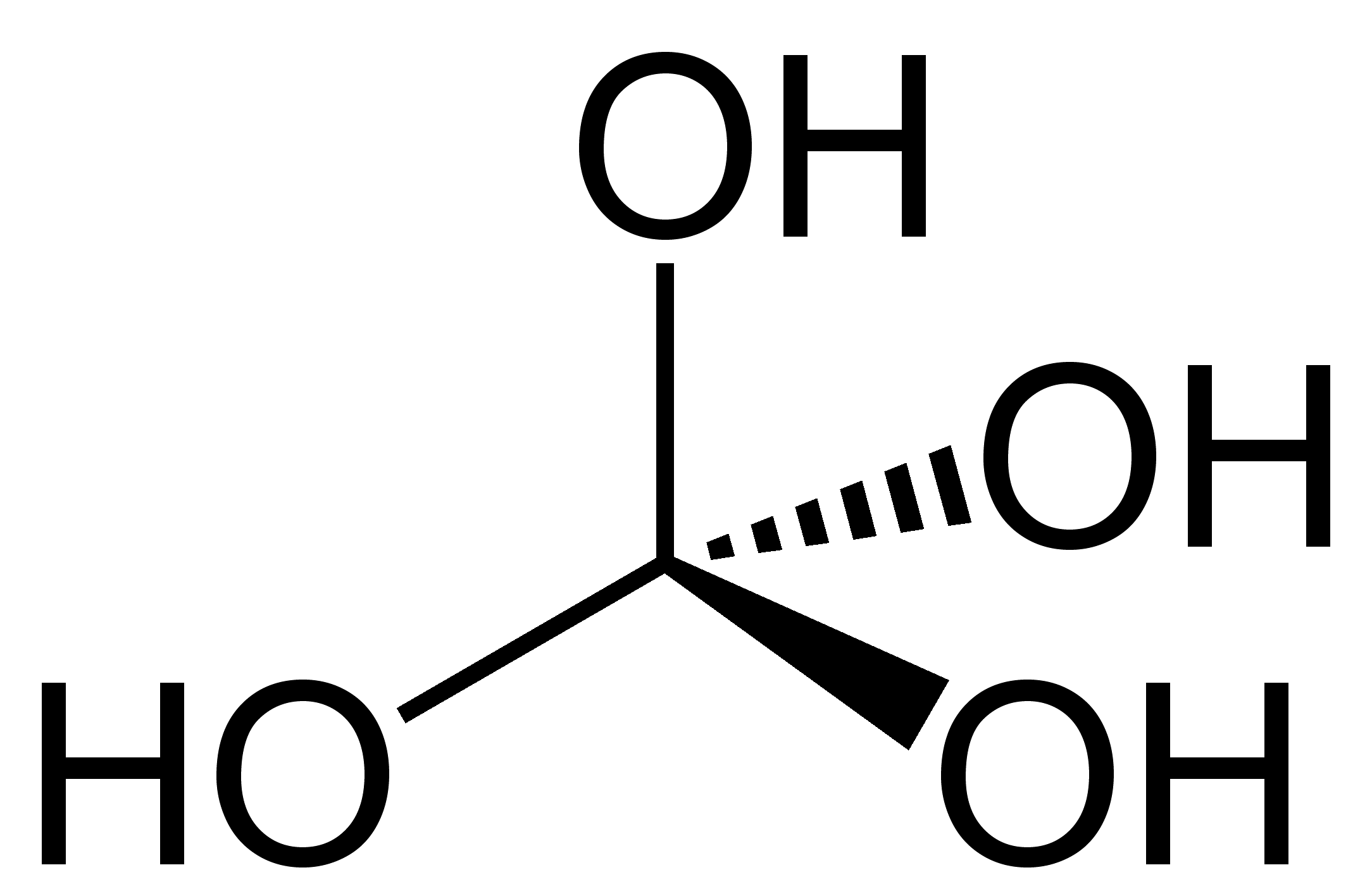
Stereo skeletal formula of orthocarbonic acid
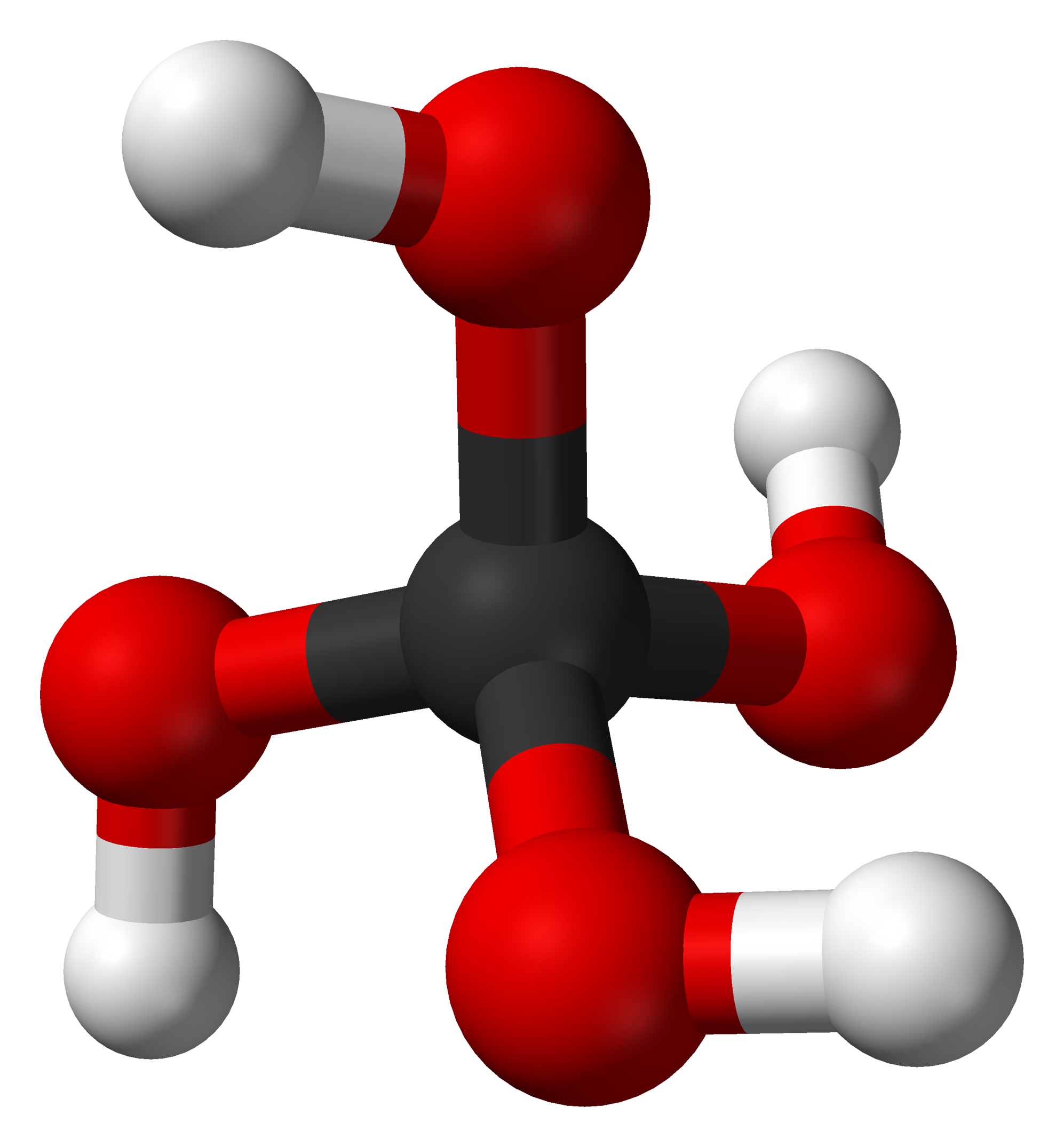
Ball and stick model of orthocarbonic acid

Names
- Preferred IUPAC name Methanetetrol
- Systematic IUPAC name Orthocarbonic acid
- Other names: Carbon tetrahydroxide

Identifiers
CAS Number	463-84-3
3D model (JSmol)	Interactive image
ChemSpider	7826887
PubChem CID	9547954
CompTox Dashboard (EPA)	DTXSID40429519
- InChI: InChI=1S/CH4O4/c2-1(3,4)5/h2-5H Key: RXCVUXLCNLVYIA-UHFFFAOYSA-N
- SMILES: OC(O)(O)O

Properties
Chemical formula	C(OH)_{4}
Molar mass	80.039 g·mol^{−1}

Related compounds
Other cations	Orthosilicic acid; Orthogermanic acid; Tin(IV) hydroxide; Lead(IV) hydroxide; Titanic acid; Zirconium(IV) hydroxide; Beryllic acid; Boric acid; Aluminic acid; Gallium(III) hydroxide; Indium(III) hydroxide; Thallium(III) hydroxide; Zinc hydroxide; Orthonitrate; Phosphorous acid; Telluric acid
Related compounds	Tetramethoxymethane; Tetraethoxymethane; Tetrapropoxymethane; Tetraphenyl orthocarbonate; Orthoformic acid
- Except where otherwise noted, data are given for materials in their standard state (at 25 °C [77 °F], 100 kPa). verify (what is ?) Infobox references

Orthocarbonic acid (also known as methanetetrol) is a chemical compound with the chemical formula H_{4}CO_{4} or C(OH)_{4}. Its molecular structure consists of a single carbon atom bonded to four hydroxyl groups. It would be therefore a fourfold alcohol. In theory, it could lose four protons to give the hypothetical oxocarbon anion orthocarbonate CO^{4−}_{4}, and is therefore considered an oxoacid of carbon.

Orthocarbonic acid is highly unstable and long held to be a hypothetical chemical compound. Calculations show that it decomposes into carbonic acid and water:

H_{4}CO_{4} → H_{2}CO_{3} + H_{2}O

However, orthocarbonic acid was first synthesized in 2025 from the electron-irradiation of a frozen mixture of water and carbon dioxide and identified by mass spectrometry.

Researchers predict that orthocarbonic acid is stable at high pressure; thus, it may form in the interior of the ice giant planets Uranus and Neptune, where water and methane are common.

== Orthocarbonate anions ==
By loss of one through four protons, orthocarbonic acid could yield four anions: H_{3}CO^{−}_{4} (trihydrogen orthocarbonate), H_{2}CO^{2−}_{4} (dihydrogen orthocarbonate), HCO^{3−}_{4} (hydrogen orthocarbonate), and CO^{4−}_{4} (orthocarbonate).

Numerous salts of fully deprotonated CO^{4−}_{4}, such as Ca_{2}CO_{4} (calcium orthocarbonate) or Sr_{2}CO_{4} (strontium orthocarbonate), have been synthesized under high pressure conditions and structurally characterized by X-ray diffraction. Strontium orthocarbonate, Sr_{2}CO_{4}, is stable at atmospheric pressure. Orthocarbonate is tetrahedral in shape, and is isoelectronic to orthonitrate. The C-O distance is 1.41 Å. Sr_{3}(CO_{4})O is an oxide orthocarbonate (tristrontium orthocarbonate oxide), also stable at atmospheric pressure.

== Orthocarbonate esters ==
The tetravalent moiety CO_{4} is found in stable organic compounds; they are formally esters of orthocarbonic acid, and therefore are called orthocarbonates. For example, tetraethoxymethane can be prepared by the reaction between chloropicrin and sodium ethoxide in ethanol. Polyorthocarbonates are stable polymers that might have applications in absorbing organic solvents in waste treatment processes, or in dental restorative materials. The explosive trinitroethylorthocarbonate possesses an orthocarbonate core.

A linear polymer which can be described as a (spiro) orthocarbonate ester of pentaerythritol, whose formula could be written as [(−CH_{2})_{2}C(CH_{2}−)_{2} (−O)_{2}C(O−)_{2}]_{n}, was synthesized in 2002.

The carbon atom in the spiro ester bis-catechol orthocarbonate was found to have tetrahedral bond geometry, contrasting with the square planar geometry of the silicon atom in the analogous orthosilicate ester.

Orthocarbonates may exist in several conformers, that differ by the relative rotation of the C–O–C bridges. The conformation structures of some esters, such as tetraphenoxymethane, tetrakis(3,5-dimethyl-phenoxy)methane, and tetrakis(4-bromophenoxy)methane have been determined by X-ray diffraction.

== See also ==
- Pentaerythritol, C(CH_{2}OH)_{4}
- Orthosilicic acid, Si(OH)_{4}
- Carbonic acid, H_{2}CO_{3}
