= Formic acid =

Simplest carboxylic acid (HCOOH)

Skeletal structure of formic acid
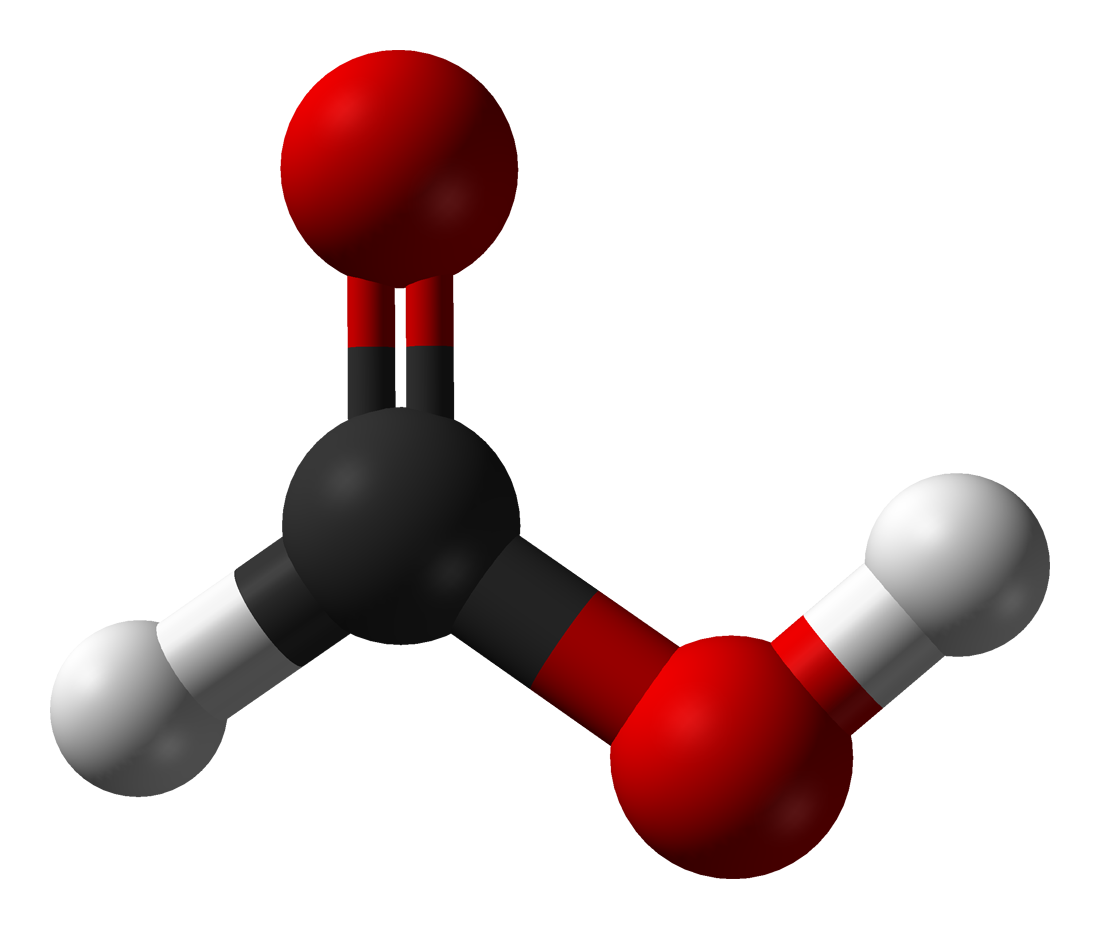
3D model of formic acid
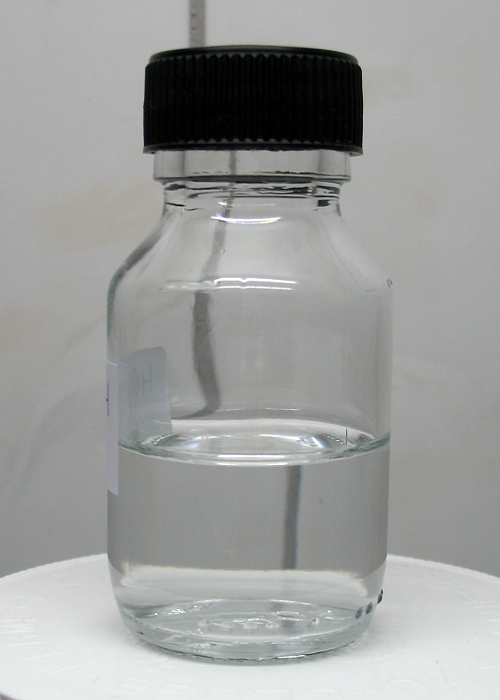

Names
- Preferred IUPAC name Formic acid
- Systematic IUPAC name Methanoic acid
- Other names: Formylic acid; Methylic acid; Hydrogencarboxylic acid; Hydroxy(oxo)methane; Metacarbonoic acid; Oxocarbinic acid; Oxomethanol; Hydroxymethylene oxide

Identifiers
CAS Number	64-18-6
3D model (JSmol)	Interactive image
Beilstein Reference	1209246
ChEBI	CHEBI:30751
ChEMBL	ChEMBL116736
ChemSpider	278
DrugBank	DB01942
ECHA InfoCard	100.000.527
EC Number	200-579-1
E number	E236 (preservatives)
Gmelin Reference	1008
KEGG	C00058
PubChem CID	284
RTECS number	LQ4900000
UNII	0YIW783RG1
CompTox Dashboard (EPA)	DTXSID2024115
- InChI: InChI=1S/HCOOH/c2-1-3/h1H,(H,2,3) Key: BDAGIHXWWSANSR-UHFFFAOYSA-N; InChI=1/HCOOH/c2-1-3/h1H,(H,2,3) Key: BDAGIHXWWSANSR-UHFFFAOYAT
- SMILES: O=CO

Properties
Chemical formula	CH_{2}O_{2}
Molar mass	46.025 g·mol^{−1}
Appearance	Colorless fuming liquid
Odor	Pungent, penetrating, similar to vinegar (acetic acid)
Density	1.220 g/mL
Melting point	8.4 °C (47.1 °F; 281.5 K)
Boiling point	100.8 °C (213.4 °F; 373.9 K)
Solubility in water	Miscible
Solubility	Miscible with ether, acetone, ethyl acetate, glycerol, methanol, ethanol Partially soluble in benzene, toluene, xylenes
log P	−0.54
Vapor pressure	35 mmHg (20 °C)
Acidity (pK_{a})	3.745
Conjugate base	Formate
Magnetic susceptibility (χ)	−19.90×10^{−6} cm^{3}/mol
Refractive index (n_{D})	1.3714 (20 °C)
Viscosity	1.57 cP at 268 °C

Structure
Molecular shape	Planar
Dipole moment	1.41 D (gas)

Thermochemistry
Std molar entropy (S^{⦵}_{298})	131.8 J/mol K
Std enthalpy of formation (Δ_{f}H^{⦵}_{298})	−425.0 kJ/mol
Std enthalpy of combustion (Δ_{c}H^{⦵}_{298})	−254.6 kJ/mol

Pharmacology
ATCvet code	QP53AG01 (WHO)

Hazards
- Occupational safety and health (OHS/OSH)
Main hazards	Corrosive; irritant; sensitizer
- GHS labelling
Pictograms	(GHS02: Flammable) (GHS05: Corrosive)
Signal word	Danger
Hazard statements	H314
Precautionary statements	P260, P264, P280, P301+P330+P331, P303+P361+P353, P304+P340, P305+P351+P338, P310, P321, P363, P405, P501
NFPA 704 (fire diamond)	3 2 0
Flash point	69 °C (156 °F; 342 K)
Autoignition temperature	601 °C (1,114 °F; 874 K)
Explosive limits	14–34% 18–57% (90% solution)
- Lethal dose or concentration (LD, LC)
LD_{50} (median dose)	700 mg/kg (mouse, oral), 1100 mg/kg (rat, oral), 4000 mg/kg (dog, oral)
LC_{50} (median concentration)	7853 ppm (rat, 15 min); 3246 ppm (mouse, 15 min)
- NIOSH (US health exposure limits)
PEL (Permissible)	TWA 5 ppm (9 mg/m^{3})
REL (Recommended)	TWA 5 ppm (9 mg/m^{3})
IDLH (Immediate danger)	30 ppm
Safety data sheet (SDS)	MSDS from JT Baker

Related compounds
Related carboxylic acids	Acetic acid Propionic acid
Related compounds	Formaldehyde; Methanol

Supplementary data page
- Formic acid (data page)
- Except where otherwise noted, data are given for materials in their standard state (at 25 °C [77 °F], 100 kPa). verify (what is ?) Infobox references

Formic acid (from Latin formica 'ant'), systematically named methanoic acid, is the simplest carboxylic acid. It has the chemical formula HCOOH and structure H−C(=O)−O−H. This acid is an important intermediate in chemical synthesis and occurs naturally, most notably in some ants. Esters, salts, and the anion derived from formic acid are called formates. Industrially, formic acid is produced from carbon monoxide.

== Natural occurrence ==
Formic acid, which has a pungent, penetrating odor, is found naturally in insects, weeds, and forest emissions. It appears in most ants and in stingless bees of the genus Oxytrigona. Wood ants from the genus Formica can spray formic acid on their prey or to defend the nest. The puss moth caterpillar (Cerura vinula) sprays it when threatened by predators. It is also found in the trichomes of stinging nettle (Urtica dioica). Formic acid is a naturally occurring component of the atmosphere primarily due to forest emissions.

== History ==
As early as the 15th century, some alchemists and naturalists were aware that ant hills give off an acidic vapor. The first person to describe the isolation of this substance (by the distillation of large numbers of ants) was English naturalist John Ray, in 1671. Ants secrete the formic acid for attack and defense purposes. Formic acid was first synthesized from hydrocyanic acid by French chemist Joseph Gay-Lussac. In 1855, another French chemist, Marcellin Berthelot, developed a synthesis from carbon monoxide similar to the process used today.

Formic acid was long considered a chemical compound of only minor interest in the chemical industry. In the late 1960s, significant quantities became available as a byproduct of acetic acid production. It now finds increasing use as a preservative and antibacterial in livestock feed.

== Properties ==
Cyclic dimer of formic acid; dashed green lines represent hydrogen bonds

Formic acid is a colorless liquid having a pungent, penetrating odor at room temperature, comparable to the related acetic acid. Formic acid is about 10 times stronger of an acid than acetic acid; its (logarithmic) dissociation constant (pKa) is 3.745, compared to the pKa of 4.756 for acetic acid.

It is miscible with water and most polar organic solvents, and is somewhat soluble in hydrocarbons. In hydrocarbons and in the vapor phase, it consists of hydrogen-bonded dimers rather than individual molecules. Owing to its tendency to hydrogen-bond, gaseous formic acid does not obey the ideal gas law. Solid formic acid, which can exist in either of two polymorphs, consists of an effectively endless network of hydrogen-bonded formic acid molecules. Formic acid forms a high-boiling azeotrope with water (107.3 °C; 77.5% formic acid). Liquid formic acid tends to supercool.

== Chemical reactions ==
=== Dehydration ===
Formic acid readily decomposes by dehydration in the presence of concentrated sulfuric acid to form carbon monoxide and water:

HCO_{2}H → H_{2}O + CO

Treatment of formic acid with sulfuric acid is a convenient laboratory source of CO.

A similar reaction is also possible with other mineral oxyacids, but not fluoroacids (e.g. hydrogen tetrafluoroborate in anhydrous hydrogen fluoride). The difference has been ascribed to a transition state stabilized by hydrogen bonding with the acid oxygens.

An unstable formic anhydride, H(C=O)−O−(C=O)H, can be obtained by dehydration of formic acid with N,N′-dicyclohexylcarbodiimide in ether at low temperature. Contrariwise, mixed anhydrides are generally stable formylating agents.

=== Hydride source ===
Formic acid shares some of the reducing properties of aldehydes, reducing solutions of metal oxides to their respective metal, and sulfur dioxide to thiosulfate via dithionite.

In synthetic organic chemistry, it is often used as a source of hydride ion, as in the Eschweiler–Clarke reaction:

The Eschweiler–Clark reaction

In the presence of various noble metals or copper chromite, formic acid decomposes with a release of hydrogen and carbon dioxide:

HCO_{2}H → H_{2} + CO_{2}

Soluble ruthenium catalysts are also effective for producing carbon monoxide-free hydrogen.

It is used as a source of hydrogen in transfer hydrogenation, as in the Leuckart reaction to make amines and (in aqueous solution or in its azeotrope with triethylamine) for hydrogenation of ketones.

=== Acid ===
Formic acid shares most of the chemical properties of other carboxylic acids. Because of its high acidity, solutions in alcohols form esters spontaneously; in Fischer esterifications of formic acid, it self-catalyzes the reaction and no additional acid catalyst is needed.

Formic acid is unique in its ability to participate in addition reactions with alkenes. Formic acids and alkenes readily react to form formate esters. In the presence of certain acids, including sulfuric and hydrofluoric acids, however, a variant of the Koch reaction occurs instead, and formic acid adds to the alkene to produce a larger carboxylic acid.

Formic acid is a source for a formyl group for example in the formylation of N-methylaniline to N-methylformanilide in toluene.

== Production ==
In 2009, the worldwide capacity for producing formic acid was 720 thousand tonnes (1.6 billion pounds) per year, roughly equally divided between Europe (350 thousand tonnes or 770 million pounds, mainly in Germany) and Asia (370 thousand tonnes or 820 million pounds, mainly in China) while production was below 1 thousand tonnes or 2.2 million pounds per year in all other continents. It is commercially available in solutions of various concentrations between 85 and 99 w/w %. As of 2009, the largest producers are BASF, Eastman Chemical Company, LC Industrial, and Feicheng Acid Chemicals, with the largest production facilities in Ludwigshafen (200 thousand tonnes or 440 million pounds per year, BASF, Germany), Oulu (105 thousand tonnes or 230 million pounds, Eastman, Finland), Nakhon Pathom (n/a, LC Industrial), and Feicheng (100 thousand tonnes or 220 million pounds, Feicheng, China). 2010 prices ranged from around €650/tonne (equivalent to around $800/tonne) in Western Europe to $1250/tonne in the United States.

=== From methyl formate and formamide ===
When methanol and carbon monoxide are combined in the presence of a strong base, the result is methyl formate, according to the chemical equation:

CH_{3}OH + CO → HCO_{2}CH_{3}

In industry, this reaction is performed in the liquid phase at elevated pressure. Typical reaction conditions are 80 °C and 40 atm. The most widely used base is sodium methoxide. Hydrolysis of the methyl formate produces formic acid:

HCO_{2}CH_{3} + H_{2}O → HCOOH + CH_{3}OH

Efficient hydrolysis of methyl formate requires a large excess of water. Some routes proceed indirectly by first treating the methyl formate with ammonia to give formamide, which is then hydrolyzed with sulfuric acid:

HCO_{2}CH_{3} + NH_{3} → HC(O)NH_{2} + CH_{3}OH
2 HC(O)NH_{2} + 2H_{2}O + H_{2}SO_{4} → 2HCO_{2}H + (NH_{4})_{2}SO_{4}

A disadvantage of this approach is the need to dispose of the ammonium sulfate byproduct. This problem has led some manufacturers to develop energy-efficient methods of separating formic acid from the excess water used in direct hydrolysis. In one of these processes, used by BASF, the formic acid is removed from the water by liquid-liquid extraction with an organic base.

=== Niche and obsolete chemical routes ===
==== By-product of acetic acid production ====
A significant amount of formic acid is produced as a byproduct in the manufacture of other chemicals. At one time, acetic acid was produced on a large scale by oxidation of alkanes, by a process that cogenerates significant formic acid. This oxidative route to acetic acid has declined in importance, so the aforementioned dedicated routes to formic acid have become more important.

==== Hydrogenation of carbon dioxide ====
The catalytic hydrogenation of CO_{2} to formic acid has long been studied. This reaction can be conducted homogeneously. Electrolytic reduction of CO_{2} to formate has been investigated but not commercialized.

==== Oxidation of biomass ====
Formic acid can also be obtained by aqueous catalytic partial oxidation of wet biomass by the OxFA process. A Keggin-type polyoxometalate (H_{5}PV_{2}Mo_{10}O_{40}) is used as the homogeneous catalyst to convert sugars, wood, waste paper, or cyanobacteria to formic acid and CO_{2} as the sole byproduct. Yields of up to 53% formic acid can be achieved.

==== Laboratory methods ====
In the laboratory, formic acid can be obtained by heating oxalic acid in glycerol followed by steam distillation. Glycerol acts as a catalyst, as the reaction proceeds through a glyceryl oxalate intermediate. If the reaction mixture is heated to higher temperatures, allyl alcohol results. The net reaction is thus:

C_{2}O_{4}H_{2} → HCO_{2}H + CO_{2}

Another illustrative method involves the reaction between lead formate and hydrogen sulfide, driven by the formation of lead sulfide.

Pb(HCOO)_{2} + H_{2}S → 2HCOOH + PbS

==== Electrochemical production ====
Formate is formed by the electrochemical reduction of CO_{2} (in the form of bicarbonate) at a lead cathode at pH 8.6:

HCO^{−}_{3} + H_{2}O + 2e^{−} → HCO^{−}_{2} + 2OH^{−}

or

CO_{2} + H_{2}O + 2e^{−} → HCO^{−}_{2} + OH^{−}

If the feed is CO_{2} and oxygen is evolved at the anode, the total reaction is:

CO_{2} + OH^{−} → HCO^{−}_{2} + 1/2 O_{2}

=== Biosynthesis ===
Formic acid is named after ants which have high concentrations of the compound in their venom, derived from serine through a 5,10-methenyltetrahydrofolate intermediate. The conjugate base of formic acid, formate, also occurs widely in nature. An assay for formic acid in body fluids, designed for determination of formate after methanol poisoning, is based on the reaction of formate with bacterial formate dehydrogenase.

== Uses ==
=== Agriculture ===
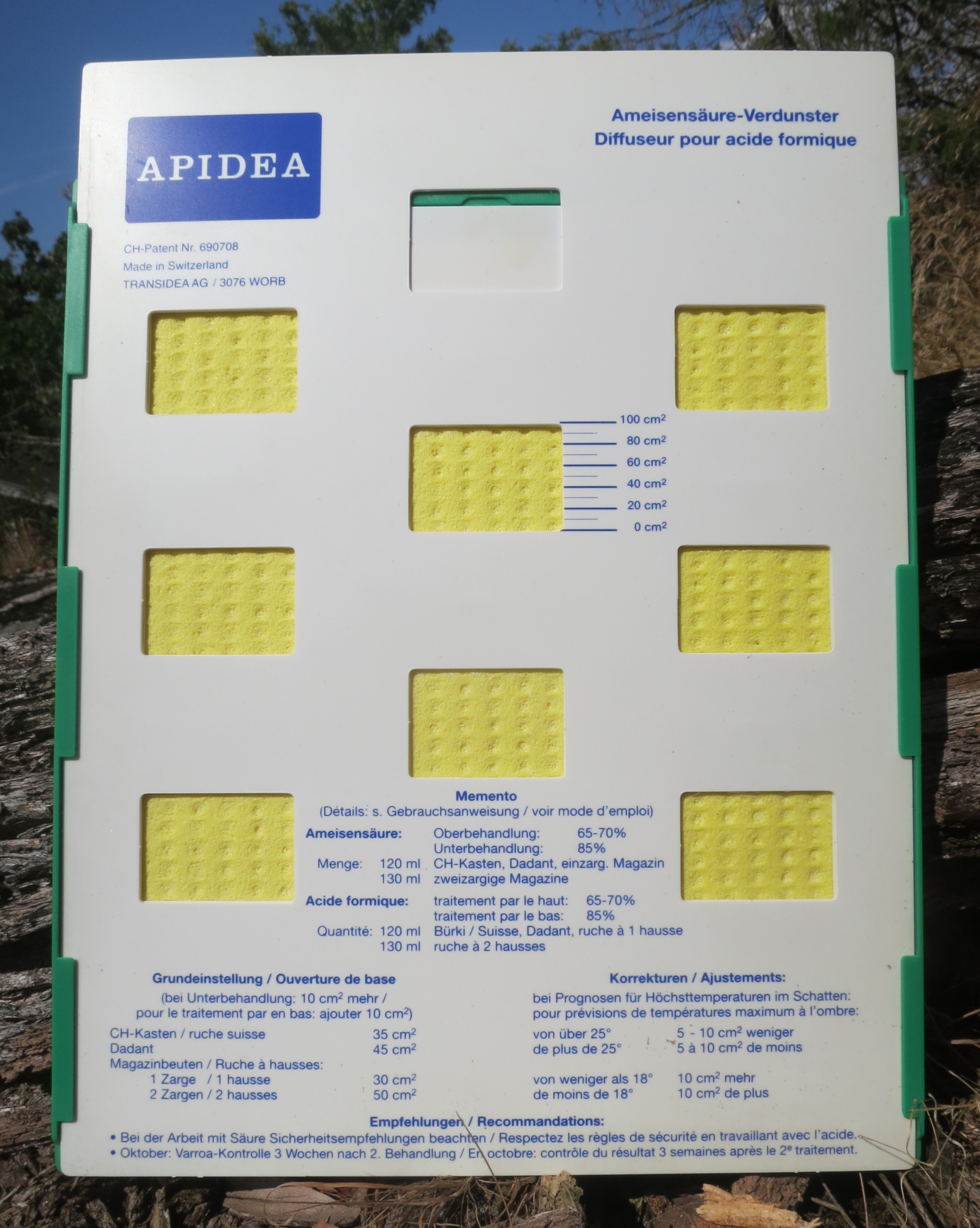
Formic acid evaporator for use in beehives.

A major use of formic acid is as a preservative and antibacterial agent in livestock feed. It arrests certain decay processes and causes the feed to retain its nutritive value longer.

In Europe, it is applied on silage, including fresh hay, to promote the fermentation of lactic acid and to suppress the formation of butyric acid; it also allows fermentation to occur quickly, and at a lower temperature, reducing the loss of nutritional value. It is widely used to preserve winter feed for cattle, and is sometimes added to poultry feed to kill E. coli bacteria. Use as a preservative for silage and other animal feed constituted 30% of the global consumption in 2009.

Beekeepers use formic acid as a miticide against the tracheal mite (Acarapis woodi) and the Varroa destructor mite and Varroa jacobsoni mite.

=== Energy ===
Formic acid can be used directly in formic acid fuel cells or indirectly in hydrogen fuel cells.

Electrolytic conversion of electrical energy to chemical fuel has been proposed as a large-scale source of formate by various groups. The formate could be used as feed to modified E. coli bacteria for producing biomass. Natural methylotroph microbes can feed on formic acid or formate

Formic acid has been considered as a means of hydrogen storage. The co-product of this decomposition, carbon dioxide, can be rehydrogenated back to formic acid in a second step. Formic acid contains 53 g/L hydrogen at room temperature and atmospheric pressure, which is three and a half times as much as compressed hydrogen gas can attain at 350 bar pressure (14.7 g/L). Pure formic acid is a liquid with a flash point of 69 °C, much higher than that of gasoline (−40 °C) or ethanol (13 °C).

It is possible to use formic acid as an intermediary to produce isobutanol from CO_{2} using microbes.

=== Soldering ===
Formic acid has a potential application in soldering. Due to its capacity to reduce oxide layers, formic acid gas can be blasted at an oxide surface to increase solder wettability.

=== Chromatography ===
Formic acid is used as a volatile pH modifier in HPLC and capillary electrophoresis. Formic acid is often used as a component of mobile phase in reversed-phase high-performance liquid chromatography (RP-HPLC) analysis and separation techniques for the separation of hydrophobic macromolecules, such as peptides, proteins and more complex structures including intact viruses. Especially when paired with mass spectrometry detection, formic acid offers several advantages over the more traditionally used phosphoric acid.

=== Other uses ===
Formic acid is also significantly used in the production of leather, including tanning (23% of the global consumption in 2009), and in dyeing and finishing textiles (9% of the global consumption in 2009) because of its acidic nature. Use as a coagulant in the production of rubber consumed 6% of the global production in 2009.

Formic acid is also used in place of mineral acids for various cleaning products, such as limescale remover and toilet bowl cleaner. Some formate esters are artificial flavorings and perfumes.

Formic acid application has been reported to be an effective treatment for warts.

In the nuclear industry, formic acid is used for the decomposition of residual nitric acid in denitrification during spent nuclear fuel reprocessing.

== Safety ==
Formic acid has low toxicity (hence its use as a food additive), with an LD_{50} of 1.8 g/kg (tested orally on mice). The concentrated acid is corrosive to the skin.

Formic acid is readily metabolized and eliminated by the body. Nonetheless, it has specific toxic effects; the formic acid and formaldehyde produced as metabolites of methanol are responsible for the optic nerve damage, causing blindness, seen in methanol poisoning. Some chronic effects of formic acid exposure have been documented. Some experiments on bacterial species have demonstrated it to be a mutagen. Chronic exposure in humans may cause kidney damage. Another possible effect of chronic exposure is development of a skin allergy that manifests upon re-exposure to the chemical.

Concentrated formic acid slowly decomposes to carbon monoxide and water, leading to pressure buildup in the containing vessel. For this reason, formic acid is stored with degassing caps in a well-ventilated area.

The hazards of solutions of formic acid depend on the concentration. The following table lists the Globally Harmonized System of Classification and Labelling of Chemicals for formic acid solutions:

Concentration (weight percent)	Pictogram	H-Phrases
2–10%	(GHS07: Exclamation mark)	H315
10–90%	(GHS05: Corrosive)	H313
>90%	(GHS05: Corrosive)	H314

Formic acid in 85% concentration is flammable, and diluted formic acid is on the U.S. Food and Drug Administration list of food additives. The principal danger from formic acid is from skin or eye contact with the concentrated liquid or vapors. The U.S. OSHA Permissible Exposure Level (PEL) of formic acid vapor in the work environment is 5 parts per million (ppm) of air.

== See also ==
- Orthoformic acid
- Formic acid vehicle
