= Methyl formate =

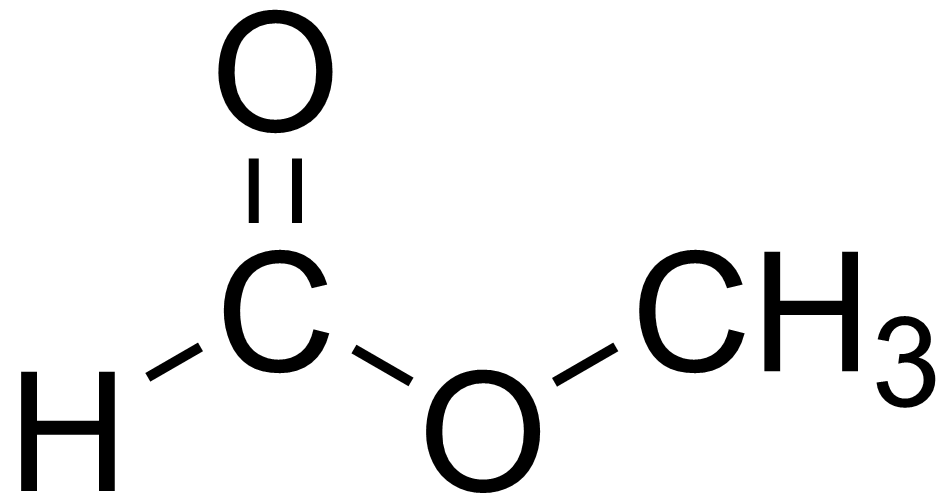
Structural formula of methyl formate
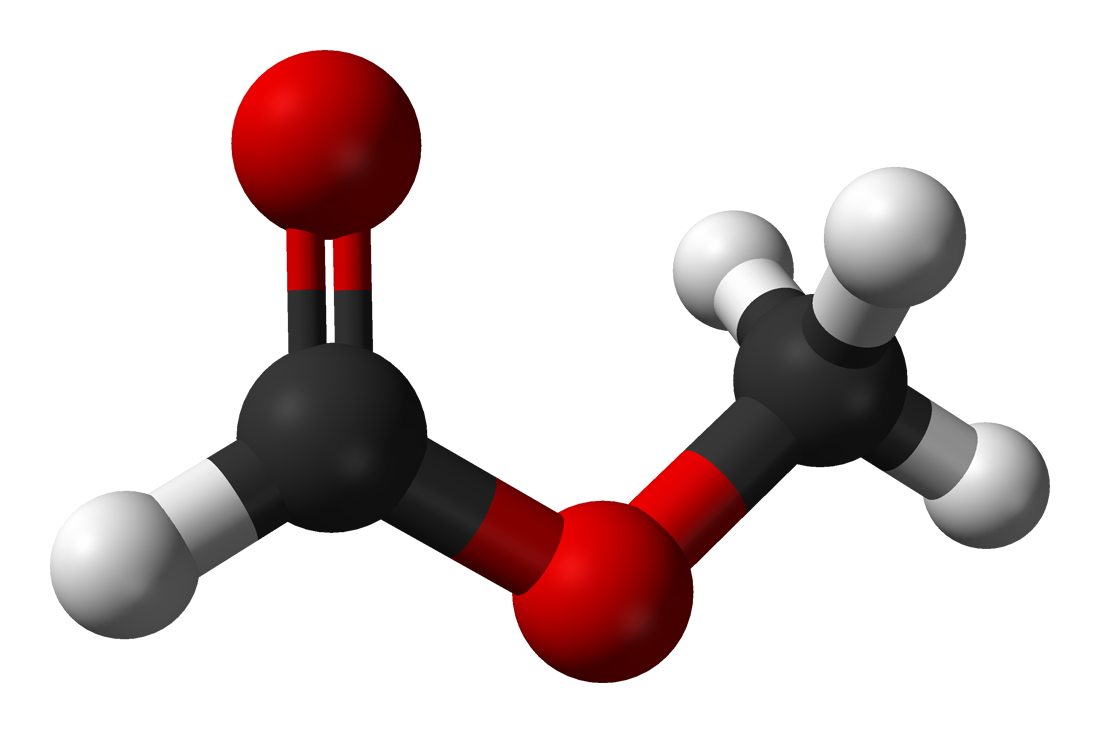
Ball-and-stick model of the methyl formate molecule
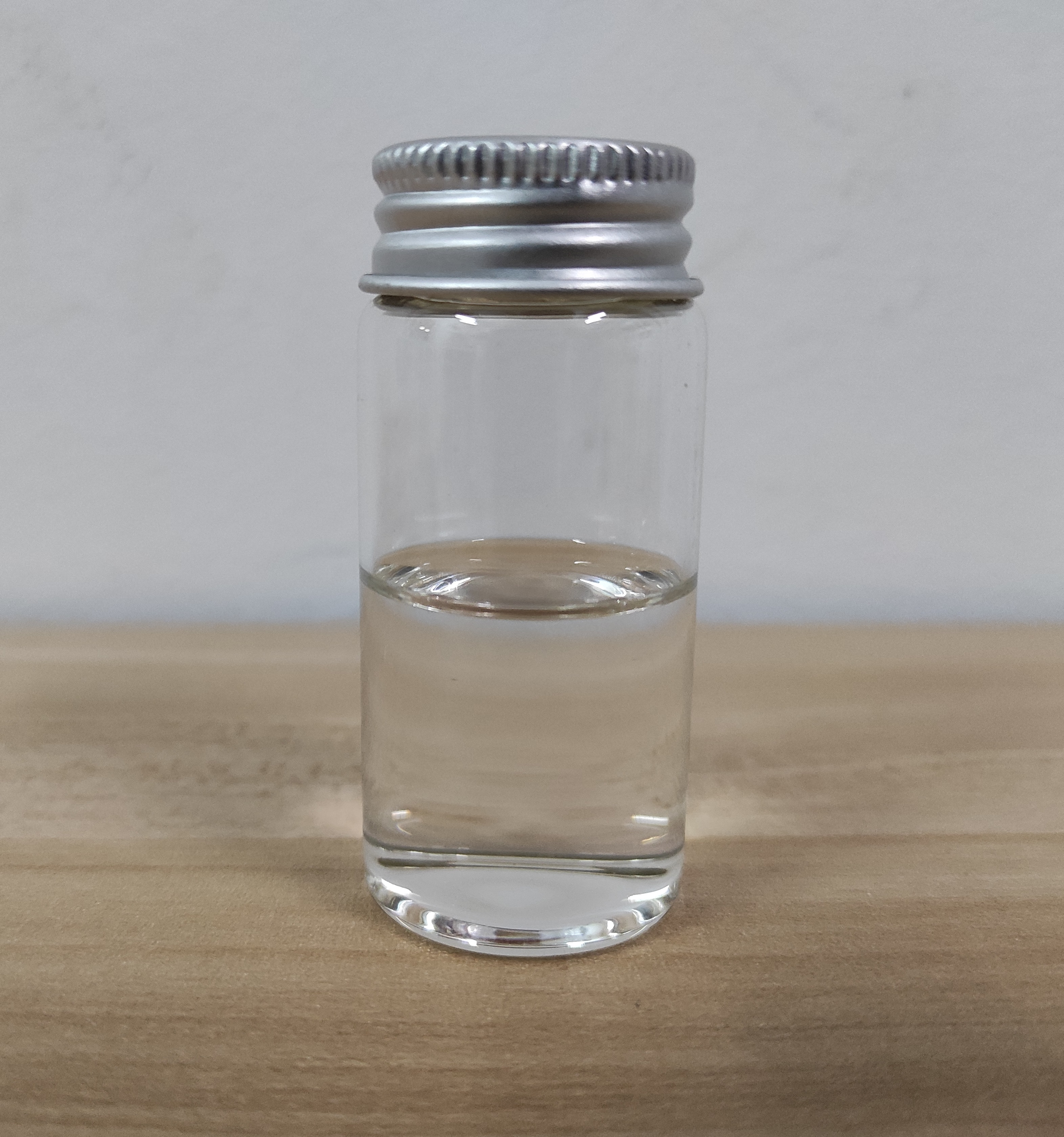

Names
- Preferred IUPAC name Methyl formate
- Systematic IUPAC name Methyl methanoate
- Other names R-611

Identifiers
CAS Number	107-31-3
3D model (JSmol)	Interactive image
ChEBI	CHEBI:77699
ChEMBL	ChEMBL295026
ChemSpider	7577
ECHA InfoCard	100.003.166
EC Number	209-282-1
PubChem CID	7865
UNII	1MPH591FTG
CompTox Dashboard (EPA)	DTXSID5025609
- InChI: InChI=1S/C2H4O2/c1-4-2-3/h2H,1H3 Key: TZIHFWKZFHZASV-UHFFFAOYSA-N; InChI=1/C2H4O2/c1-4-2-3/h2H,1H3 Key: TZIHFWKZFHZASV-UHFFFAOYAI
- SMILES: O=COC

Properties
Chemical formula	C_{2}H_{4}O_{2}
Molar mass	60.052 g·mol^{−1}
Appearance	Colorless liquid
Odor	pleasant, ethereal
Density	0.98 g/cm^{3}
Melting point	−100 °C (−148 °F; 173 K)
Boiling point	32 °C (90 °F; 305 K)
Solubility in water	30% (20°C)
Vapor pressure	634 hPa (476 mmHg) (20°C)
Magnetic susceptibility (χ)	−32.0·10^{−6} cm^{3}/mol

Hazards
- Occupational safety and health (OHS/OSH)
Main hazards	Can cause eye injury
- GHS labelling
Pictograms	(GHS02: Flammable) (GHS07: Exclamation mark)
Signal word	Danger
Hazard statements	H224, H302, H319, H332, H335
Precautionary statements	P210, P233, P240, P241, P242, P243, P261, P264, P270, P271, P280, P301+P312, P303+P361+P353, P304+P312, P304+P340, P305+P351+P338, P312, P330, P337+P313, P370+P378, P403+P233, P403+P235, P405, P501
NFPA 704 (fire diamond)	2 4 0
Flash point	−19 °C; −2 °F; 254 K
Explosive limits	4.5%-23%
- Lethal dose or concentration (LD, LC)
LD_{50} (median dose)	1622 mg/kg (oral, rabbit)
LC_{Lo} (lowest published)	50,000 ppm (guinea pig, 20 min)
- NIOSH (US health exposure limits)
PEL (Permissible)	TWA 100 ppm (250 mg/m^{3})
REL (Recommended)	TWA 100 ppm (250 mg/m^{3}) ST 150 ppm (375 mg/m^{3})
IDLH (Immediate danger)	4500 ppm
Safety data sheet (SDS)	Oxford MSDS
- Except where otherwise noted, data are given for materials in their standard state (at 25 °C [77 °F], 100 kPa). verify (what is ?) Infobox references

Methyl formate, also called methyl methanoate, is the methyl ester of formic acid. It has the chemical formula HCOOCH_{3}. The simplest example of a carboxylate ester, it is a colourless liquid with an ethereal odour, high vapor pressure, and low surface tension. It is a precursor to many other compounds of commercial interest.

== Production ==
In the laboratory, methyl formate can be produced by the condensation reaction of methanol and formic acid, as follows:

HCOOH + CH_{3}OH → HCOOCH_{3} + H_{2}O

Industrial methyl formate, however, is usually produced by the combination of methanol and carbon monoxide (carbonylation) in the presence of a strong base, such as sodium methoxide:

CH_{3}OH + CO → CH_{3}OCHO

This process, practiced commercially by BASF among other companies gives 96% selectivity toward methyl formate. The catalyst for this process is sensitive to water, which can be present in the carbon monoxide feedstock, which is commonly derived from synthesis gas. Very dry carbon monoxide is, therefore, essential.

== Uses ==
Methyl formate is used primarily to manufacture formamide, dimethylformamide, and formic acid. These compounds are precursors or building blocks for many useful derivatives.

Because of its high vapor pressure, it is used for quick-drying finishes and as a blowing agent for some polyurethane foam applications, and as a replacement for CFCs, HCFCs, and HFCs. Methyl formate has near zero ozone depletion potential and zero global warming potential and a short atmospheric life of 3 days.

It is also used as an insecticide.

A historical use of methyl formate, which sometimes brings it attention, was in refrigeration. Before the introduction of less-toxic refrigerants, methyl formate was used as an alternative to sulfur dioxide in domestic refrigerators, such as some models of the famous GE Monitor Top.
