= Dimethylformamide =

- Skeletal formula of dimethylformamide with one explicit hydrogen added

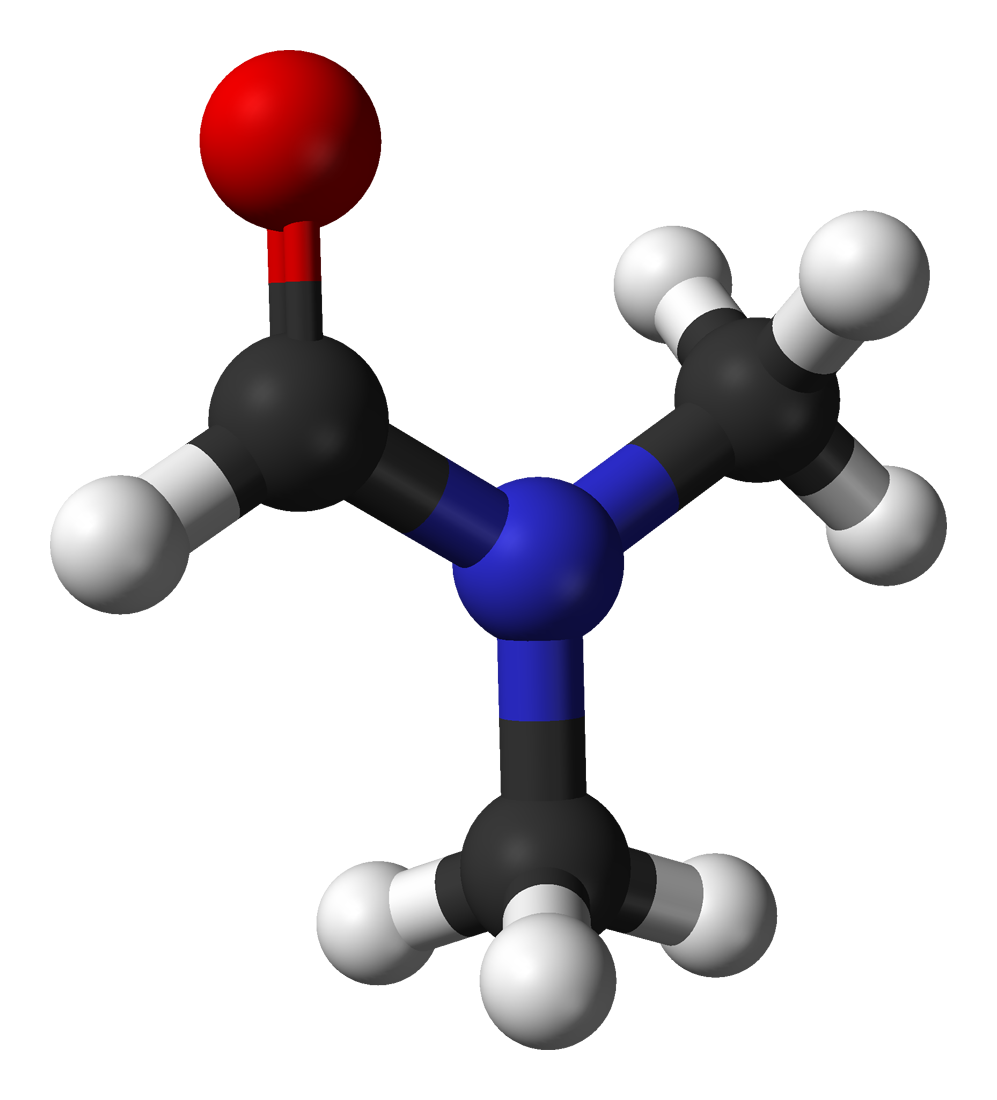
Ball and stick model of dimethylformamide
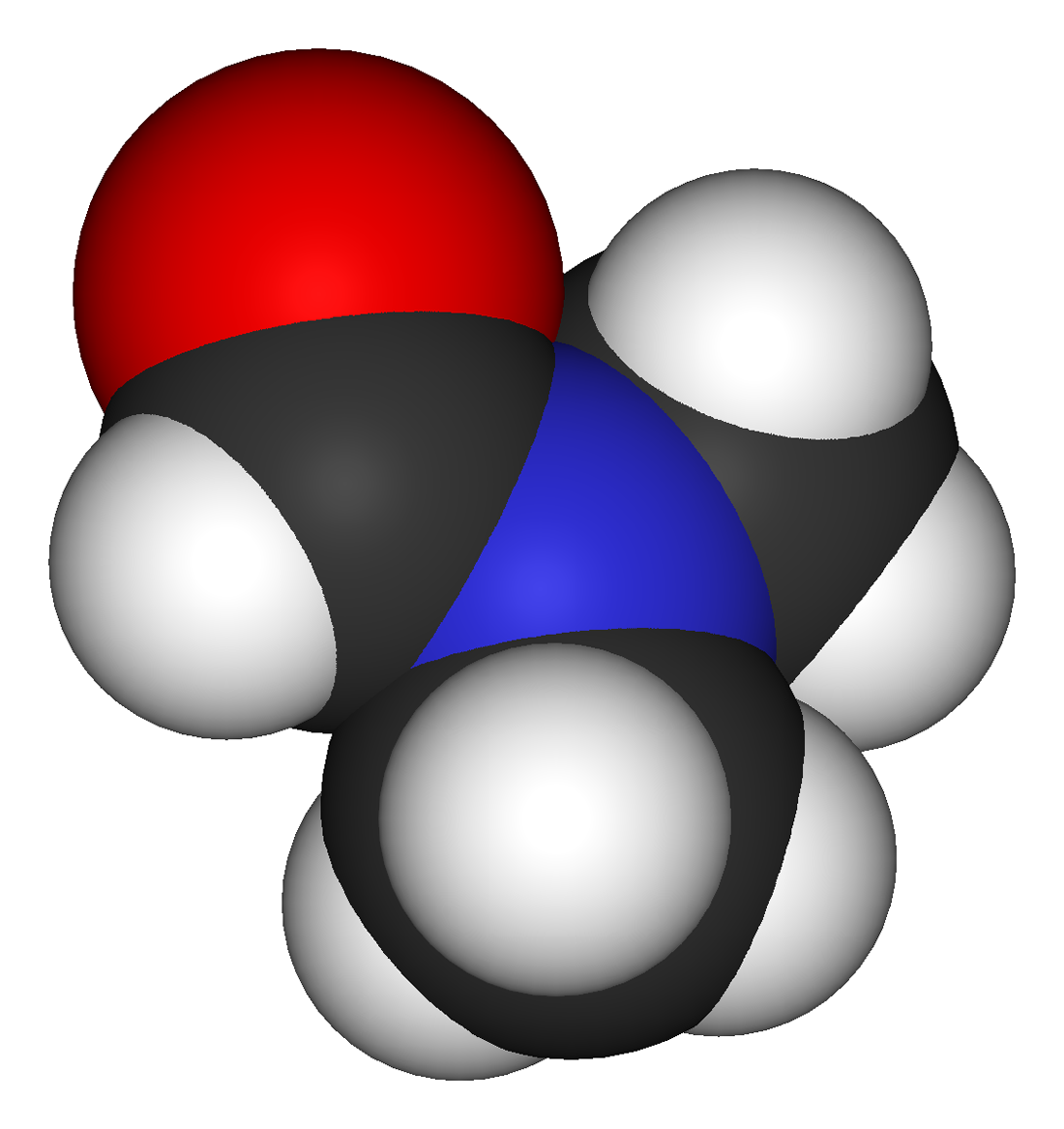
Spacefill model of dimethylformamide

Names
- Preferred IUPAC name N,N-Dimethylformamide
- Systematic IUPAC name N,N-Dimethylmethanamide
- Other names Dimethylformamide; DMF

Identifiers
CAS Number	68-12-2
3D model (JSmol)	Interactive image
Beilstein Reference	605365
ChEBI	CHEBI:17741
ChEMBL	ChEMBL268291
ChemSpider	5993
DrugBank	DB01844
ECHA InfoCard	100.000.617
EC Number	200-679-5
KEGG	C03134
MeSH	Dimethylformamide
PubChem CID	6228
RTECS number	LQ2100000
UNII	8696NH0Y2X
UN number	2265
CompTox Dashboard (EPA)	DTXSID6020515
- InChI: InChI=1S/C3H7NO/c1-4(2)3-5/h3H,1-2H3 Key: ZMXDDKWLCZADIW-UHFFFAOYSA-N
- SMILES: CN(C)C=O

Properties
Chemical formula	C_{3}H_{7}NO
Molar mass	73.095 g·mol^{−1}
Appearance	Colourless liquid
Odor	Odorless, fishy if impure
Density	0.948 g/mL
Melting point	−61 °C (−78 °F; 212 K)
Boiling point	153 °C (307 °F; 426 K)
Solubility in water	Miscible
log P	−0.829
Vapor pressure	516 Pa
Acidity (pK_{a})	−0.3 (for the conjugate acid) (H_{2}O)
UV-vis (λ_{max})	270 nm
Absorbance	1.00
Refractive index (n_{D})	1.4305 (at 20 °C)
Viscosity	0.92 mPa·s (at 20 °C)

Structure
Dipole moment	3.86 D

Thermochemistry
Heat capacity (C)	146.05 J/(K·mol)
Std enthalpy of formation (Δ_{f}H^{⦵}_{298})	−239.4 ± 1.2 kJ/mol
Std enthalpy of combustion (Δ_{c}H^{⦵}_{298})	−1.9416 ± 0.0012 MJ/mol

Hazards
- GHS labelling
Pictograms	(GHS02: Flammable) (GHS07: Exclamation mark) (GHS08: Health hazard)
Signal word	Danger
Hazard statements	H226, H312, H319, H332, H360
Precautionary statements	P280, P305+P351+P338, P308+P313
NFPA 704 (fire diamond)	2 2 0
Flash point	58 °C (136 °F; 331 K)
Autoignition temperature	445 °C (833 °F; 718 K)
Explosive limits	2.2–15.2%
Threshold limit value (TLV)	30 mg/m^{3} (TWA)
- Lethal dose or concentration (LD, LC)
LD_{50} (median dose)	1.5 g/kg (rabbit, dermal); 2.8 g/kg (rat, oral); 3.7 g/kg (mouse, oral); 3.5 g/kg (rat, oral)
LC_{50} (median concentration)	3092 ppm (mouse, 2 h)
LC_{Lo} (lowest published)	5000 ppm (rat, 6 h)
- NIOSH (US health exposure limits)
PEL (Permissible)	TWA 10 ppm (30 mg/m^{3}) [skin]
REL (Recommended)	TWA 10 ppm (30 mg/m^{3}) [skin]
IDLH (Immediate danger)	500 ppm

Related compounds
Related alkanamides	N-Methylformamide; Diethylformamide; Deuterated DMF
Related compounds	N-Nitroso-N-methylurea; ENU
- Except where otherwise noted, data are given for materials in their standard state (at 25 °C [77 °F], 100 kPa). verify (what is ?) Infobox references

Dimethylformamide, DMF is an organic compound with the chemical formula HCON(CH_{3})_{2}. Its structure is HC(=O)−N(−CH_{3})_{2}. Commonly abbreviated as DMF (although this initialism is sometimes used for dimethylfuran, or dimethyl fumarate), this colourless liquid is miscible with water and the majority of organic liquids. DMF is a common solvent for chemical reactions. Dimethylformamide is odorless, but technical-grade or degraded samples often have a fishy smell due to impurity of dimethylamine. Dimethylamine degradation impurities can be removed by sparging samples with an inert gas such as argon or by sonicating the samples under reduced pressure. As its name indicates, it is structurally related to formamide, having two methyl groups in the place of the two hydrogens. DMF is a polar (hydrophilic) aprotic solvent with a high boiling point. It facilitates reactions that follow polar mechanisms, such as S_{N}2 reactions.

== Structure and properties ==
As for most amides, the spectroscopic evidence indicates partial double bond character for the C−N and C−O bonds.Thus, the infrared spectrum shows a C=O stretching frequency at only 1675 cm^{−1}, whereas a ketone would absorb near 1700 cm^{−1}.

DMF is a classic example of a fluxional molecule.

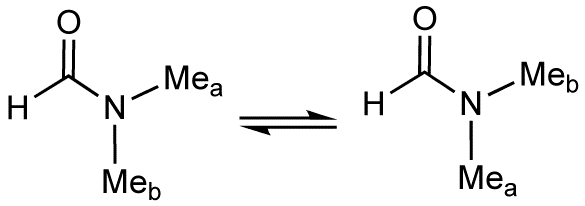

The ambient temperature ^{1}H NMR spectrum shows two methyl signals, indicative of hindered rotation about the (O)C−N bond. At temperatures near 100 °C, the 500 MHz NMR spectrum of this compound shows only one signal for the methyl groups.

DMF is miscible with water. The vapour pressure at 20 °C is 3.5 hPa. A Henry's law constant of 7.47 × 10^{−5} hPa·m^{3}/mol can be deduced from an experimentally determined equilibrium constant at 25 °C. The partition coefficient log P_{OW} is measured to −0.85. Since the density of DMF (0.95 g·cm^{−3} at 20 °C) is similar to that of water, significant flotation or stratification in surface waters in case of accidental losses is not expected.

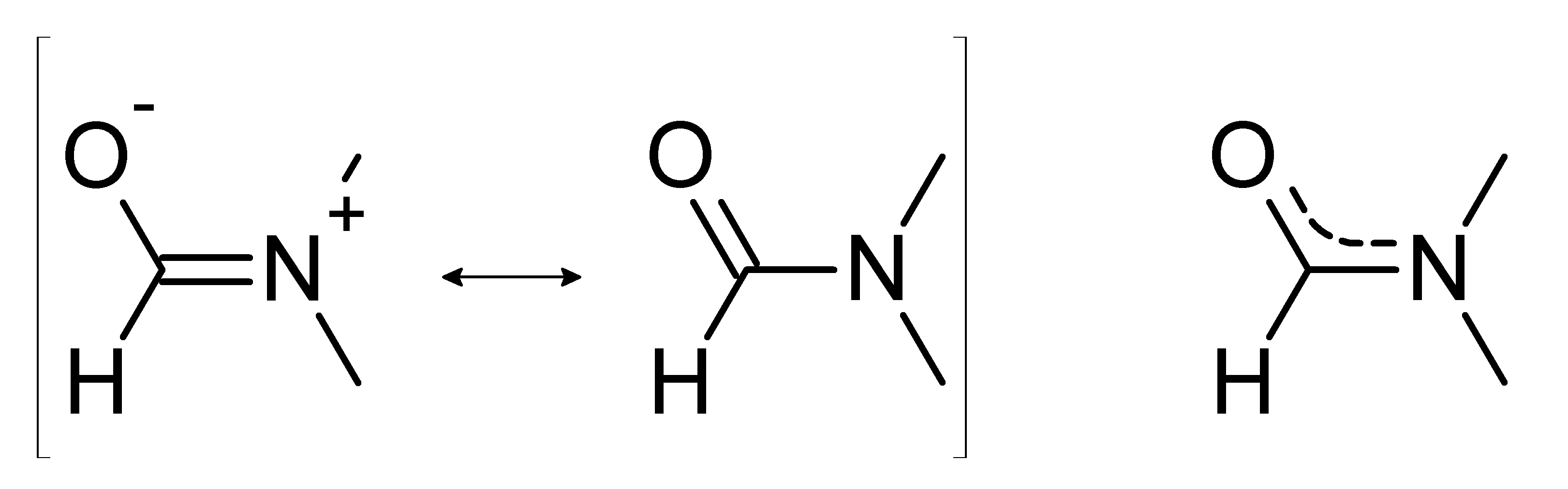
Left: two resonance structures of DMF. Right: illustration highlighting delocalization.

== Reactions ==
DMF is hydrolyzed by strong acids and bases, especially at elevated temperatures. With sodium hydroxide, DMF converts to formate and dimethylamine. DMF undergoes decarbonylation near its boiling point to give dimethylamine and carbon monoxide. Distillation is therefore conducted under reduced pressure at lower temperatures.

In one of its main uses in organic synthesis, DMF is a reagent in the Vilsmeier–Haack reaction, which is used to formylate aromatic compounds. The process involves initial conversion of DMF to a chloroiminium ion, [(CH_{3})_{2}N=CH(Cl)]^{+}, known as a Vilsmeier reagent, which attacks arenes.

Organolithium compounds and Grignard reagents react with DMF to give aldehydes after hydrolysis in a reaction called Bouveault aldehyde synthesis.

Dimethylformamide forms 1:1 adducts with a variety of Lewis acids such as the soft acid I_{2}, and the hard acid phenol. It is classified as a hard Lewis base and its ECW model base parameters are E_{B} = 2.19 and C_{B} = 1.31. Its relative donor strength toward a series of acids, versus other Lewis bases, can be illustrated by C-B plots.

== History and synthesis ==
DMF was first obtained in 1893 by the French chemist Albert Verley (1867–1959), by distilling a mixture of dimethylamine hydrochloride and potassium formate.

It is now industrially manufactured by combining methyl formate and dimethylamine or by reaction of dimethylamine with carbon monoxide.

Although currently impractical, DMF can be prepared from supercritical carbon dioxide using ruthenium-based catalysts.

== Applications ==
The primary use of DMF is as a solvent with low evaporation rate. DMF is used in the production of acrylic fibers and plastics. It is also used as a solvent in peptide coupling for pharmaceuticals, in the development and production of pesticides, and in the manufacture of adhesives, synthetic leathers, fibers, films, and surface coatings.

- It is used as a reagent in the Bouveault aldehyde synthesis and in the Vilsmeier-Haack reaction, another useful method of forming aldehydes.
- It is a common solvent in the Heck reaction.
- It is a common catalyst used in the synthesis of acyl halides, in particular the synthesis of acyl chlorides from carboxylic acids using oxalyl or thionyl chloride. The catalytic mechanism entails reversible formation of an imidoyl chloride (also known as the 'Vilsmeier reagent'):

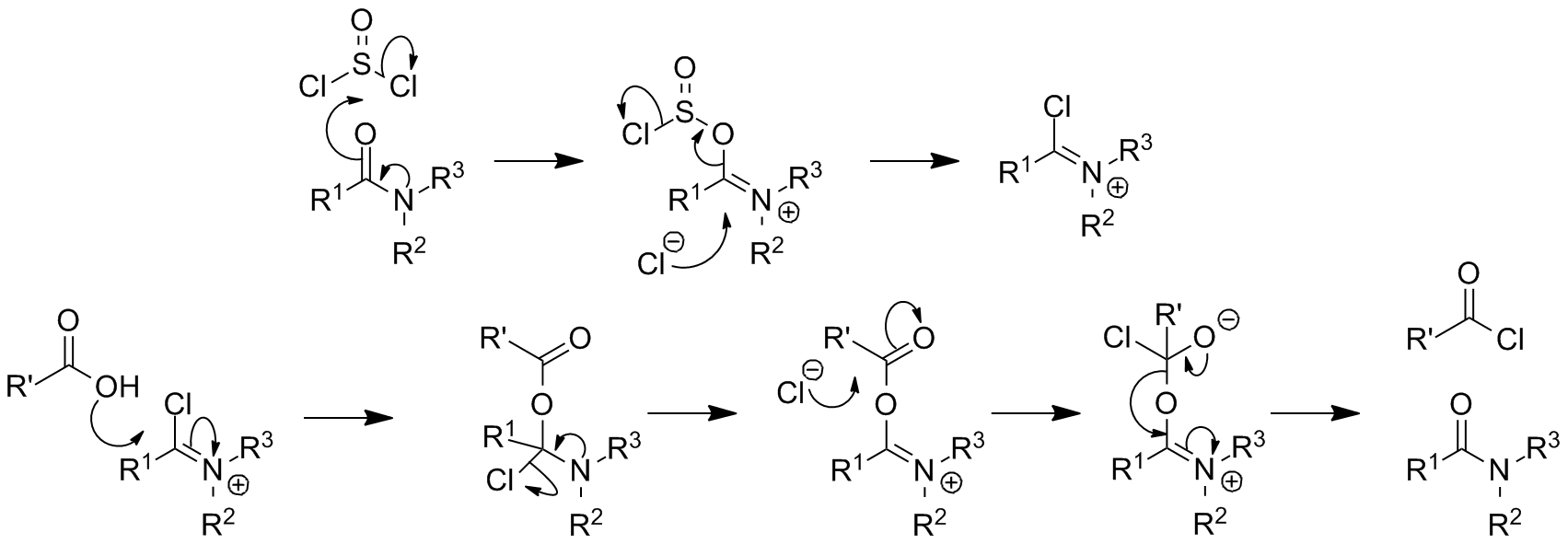

- DMF penetrates most plastics and makes them swell. Because of this property DMF is suitable for solid phase peptide synthesis and as a component of paint strippers.
- DMF is used as a solvent to recover olefins such as 1,3-butadiene via extractive distillation.
- It is used in the manufacturing of solvent dyes as an important raw material. It is consumed during reaction.
- Pure acetylene gas cannot be compressed and stored without the danger of explosion. Industrial acetylene is safely compressed in the presence of dimethylformamide, which forms a safe, concentrated solution. The casing is also filled with agamassan, which renders it safe to transport and use.

As a cheap and common reagent, DMF has many uses in a research laboratory.

- DMF is effective at separating and suspending carbon nanotubes, and is recommended by the NIST for use in near infrared spectroscopy of such.
- DMF can be utilized as a standard in proton NMR spectroscopy allowing for a quantitative determination of an unknown compound.
- In the synthesis of organometallic compounds, it is used as a source of carbon monoxide ligands.
- DMF is a common solvent used in electrospinning.
- DMF is commonly used in the solvothermal synthesis of metal–organic frameworks.
- DMF-d_{7} in the presence of a catalytic amount of potassium tert-butoxide under microwave heating is a reagent for deuteration of polyaromatic hydrocarbons.

== Safety ==
Dimethylformamide vapor exposure has shown reduced alcohol tolerance and skin irritation in some cases.

On 20 June 2018, the Danish Environmental Protective Agency published an article about DMF's use in squishies. The density of the compound in the toy resulted in all squishies being removed from the Danish market. All squishies were recommended to be thrown out as household waste.

== Toxicity ==
The acute LD50 (oral, rats and mice) is 2.2–7.55 g/kg. Hazards of DMF have been examined.
