= C2H5N3O2 =

The molecular formula C_{2}H_{5}N_{3}O_{2} (molar mass: 103.08 g/mol, exact mass: 103.0382 u) may refer to:

- Biuret
- N-Nitroso-N-methylurea (NMU)
