= Specific-locus test =

Mouse assay for heritable germline mutation

The specific-locus test (SLT) is a genetic test to assess the impact of mutagens such as radiation or chemicals on mutation rates in a selected set of easily measured genes. The SLT measures mutation rates in a laboratory mouse by mating mutagen-exposed wild-type animals with tester-stock mice carrying recessive alleles at a defined set of marker loci, classically seven, with visible traits such as altered coat color or short ears.

== Overview ==
The specific-locus test is an assay that uses mutagenesis of the mouse germline to detect and quantify heritable mutations; these mutations are those which are transmitted to first-generation offspring, and measured as visible traits. Because the marker genes are a small number of loci (seven, in the most widely used mice), the assay was given the name of the “mouse specific-locus test” or “SLT”. The method was developed for radiation treatment and effects but the same approach was later applied to chemical mutagenesis.

The assay is best used for measuring heritable point mutations and small deficiencies affecting the wild-type allele contributed by the treated parent, which are revealed when paired with a recessive marker allele in the offspring.

In the offspring from the cross, a newly induced mutation at one of the marker loci yields the recessive (and visible trait); this allows for rapid and large-scale screening for radiation- and chemical-induced mutations, and it requires no specialized equipment.

== Test design and genetic changes detected ==
To conduct the test, an individual must be produced that is heterozygous for multiple alleles that each have a distinct visible phenotype in their homozygous recessive state. Therefore, a wild-type parent, either untreated as a control or exposed to the mutagen being tested, is crossed to a multiple-recessive tester stock. The standard visible-marker "T stock" has a set of the following seven recessive markers:

- a / non-agouti - for coat color variation
- b / brown coat
- c or cch / albino or chinchilla-related locus
- p / pink-eyed dilution
- d / dilute (coat pigment dispersion)
- se / short ear (the BMP5 gene)
- s / piebald or spotted coat

Most markers used in the test are visible through coat color, eye color, or ear morphology. The heterozygous offspring of the cross are normally wild type in appearance unless a new mutation has occurred at one of the marked loci. However, a key aspect of the test is that mutant offspring are recognized by the visible recessive phenotype at one of the marker loci. Scoring of the impact of the treatment is possible at about three weeks, although some mutants are recognizable earlier in development. Allelism tests are used to confirm suspected mutations when needed.

The types of mutations that yield a visible phenotype are known to be intragenic changes, including base-pair substitutions, frameshifts, and intragenic deletions, plus small deficiencies affecting marked loci, and occasional gross rearrangements. Some dominant visible mutations outside the marked loci are detectable incidentally. Double mutants at closely linked loci, especially d and se, sometimes indicate larger deletions. The mutational spectrum as measured across the set of marker loci is used to compare qualitative differences among mutagens.

== Applications and findings ==
The original application of the method was to assess dose responses for radiation mutagenesis in mouse germ cells, as the mutations that are inherited occur in spermatogonial stem cells, post-spermatogonial stages, or oocytes. This provided a comparison with Drosophila mutation-rate assessments. The specific-locus test was first used to measure the effect of chemical mutagenesis by Bruce Cattanach in his work with triethylenemelamine (TEM). Subsequent larger-scale work analyzed more than 25 chemical agents, and of these, 17 yielded positive or negative classifications. A small-scale ENU experiment was sufficient to show strong mutagenicity in mouse spermatogonia; as a result, ENU was later used widely as a mouse mutagen, as it primarily creates mutations in single genes rather than large-scale chromosomal aberrations.

One major finding from the dose-rate analysis performed with radiation mutagenesis is that protracted exposure produced fewer mutations than acute exposure at the same total dose; this provided early evidence for repair of mutational damage. A key 1958 paper tested whether radiation-induced mutation frequency depended on dose rate. The authors found lower specific-locus mutation rates after chronic gamma irradiation of spermatogonia than after acute X-ray exposure. These observations challenged the earlier view, based largely on Drosophila spermatozoa, that mutation frequency was independent of dose rate. Their findings suggested that genetic hazards under some radiation conditions could be lower than estimates based only on acute irradiation experiments.

== Strengths and limitations ==
The strengths of the SLT are that it provides a direct assay of transmitted genetic damage in a mammal; there is first-generation scoring via simple visible phenotypes that require no specialized instrumentation for classic visible-marker version. The mutants are recoverable as stocks for additional genetic analysis. And the test is useful for comparing mutational spectra among loci.

The limitations of the test are that large numbers of mice are required, and only a small set of loci are monitored. The large numbers of mice takes a lot of space, and breeding the animals takes significant time. In addition, mutations without visible effects at the tested loci (like silent mutations) will not be detected, resulting in an under-count of mutational events.

== History ==
The SLT was independently developed by Toby C. Carter in Edinburgh and William Russell at Oak Ridge National Laboratory.

Russell began developing the method in 1947 after joining Oak Ridge National Laboratory, with the early planning stages involving Alexander Hollaender, Sewall Wright, and H. J. Muller. The motivation for the development of the SLT was the need for mammalian data on radiation-induced gene mutations, because at that time, risk estimates depended heavily on Drosophila data and not on a vertebrate animal more closely related to humans.

The first Oak Ridge irradiation experiment was performed in March of 1949, while the first confirmed pilot mutant was at the d locus and the second pilot mutant was the c locus. In a 1951 Cold Spring Harbor Symposium report, the main 600 R X-ray experiment performed by Russell used 48,007 offspring and identified 53 specific-locus mutations, while the control group with 37,868 offspring identified only two mutations, demonstrating that the method has high sensitivity for the detection of radiation-induced mutations.
