= Deuterated DMF =

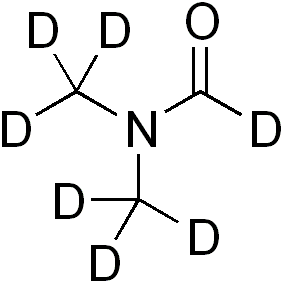
- Skeletal formula of deuterated DMF

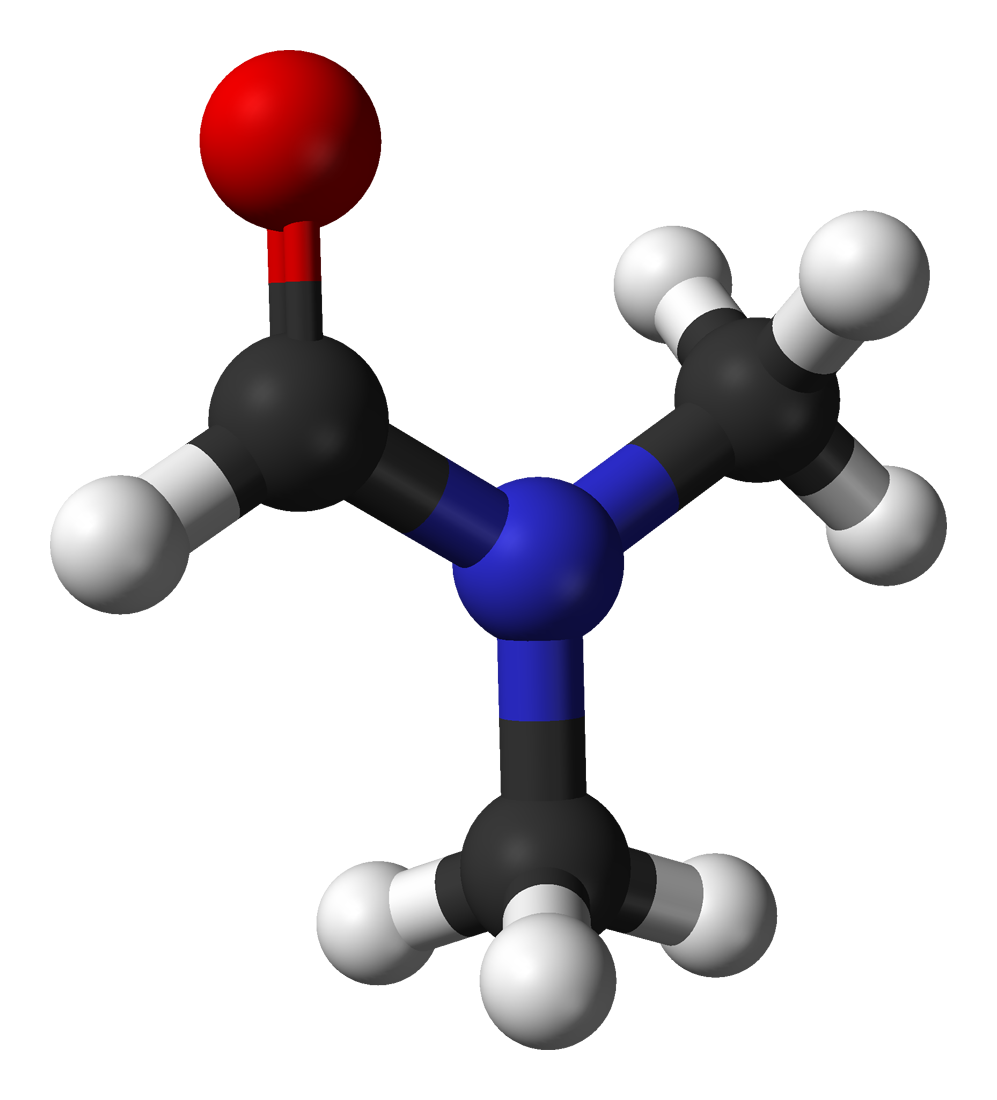
Ball and stick model of deuterated DMF
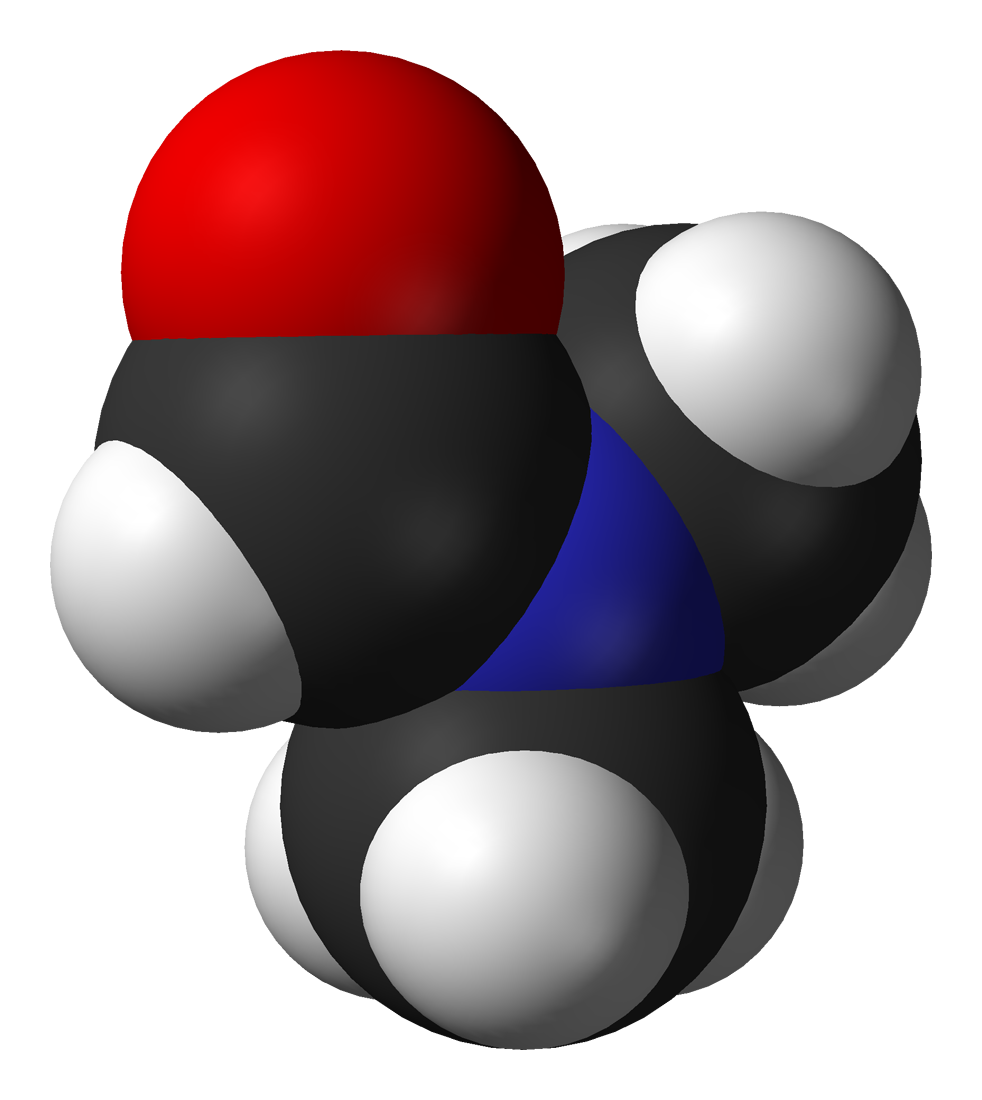
Spacefill model of deuterated DMF

Names
- IUPAC name 1-Deuterio-N,N-bis(trideuteriomethyl)formamide
- Other names: Dimethylformamide-d_{7}; N,N-Dimethylformamide-d_{7}; Heptadeutero-N,N-dimethylformamide

Identifiers
| CAS Number | 4472-41-7 |
| 3D model (JSmol) | Interactive image |
| Abbreviations | DMF-d_{7} |
| Beilstein Reference | 1908468 |
| ChemSpider | 70601 |
| ECHA InfoCard | 100.022.497 |
| EC Number | 224-745-8 |
| PubChem CID | 78225 |
| UN number | 2265 |
| CompTox Dashboard (EPA) | DTXSID30196283 |
- InChI: InChI=1S/C3H7NO/c1-4(2)3-5/h3H,1-2H3/i1D3,2D3,3D Key: ZMXDDKWLCZADIW-YYWVXINBSA-N
- SMILES: [2H]C(=O)N(C([2H])([2H])[2H])C([2H])([2H])[2H]

Properties
| Chemical formula | C_{3}^{2}H_{7}NO or C_{3}D_{7}NO |
| Molar mass | 80.1369 g mol^{−1} |
| Appearance | Colourless liquid |
| Density | 1.03 g mL^{−1} |
| Boiling point | 153 °C (307 °F; 426 K) |
| Refractive index (n_{D}) | 1.428 |

Hazards
- GHS labelling
| Pictograms | (GHS07: Exclamation mark) (GHS08: Health hazard) |
| Signal word | Danger |
| Hazard statements | H312, H319, H332, H360 |
| Precautionary statements | P280, P305+P351+P338, P308+P313 |
| Flash point | 58 °C (136 °F; 331 K) |
| Explosive limits | 2.2–15.2% |
- Lethal dose or concentration (LD, LC)
| LD_{50} (median dose) | 2.8 g kg^{−1} (oral, rat); 1.5–4.72 g kg^{−1} (dermal, rabbit) |

Related compounds
| Related alkanamides | N-Methylformamide; Dimethylformamide |
| Related compounds | N-Nitroso-N-methylurea; ENU |
- Except where otherwise noted, data are given for materials in their standard state (at 25 °C [77 °F], 100 kPa). verify (what is ?) Infobox references

Deuterated dimethylformamide ((CD_{3})_{2}NCOD), also known as deuterated DMF, is an isotopologue of DMF ((CH_{3})_{2}NCOH) in which the hydrogen atom ("H") is replaced with a deuterium isotope ("D"). Deuterated DMF is a relatively uncommon solvent used in NMR spectroscopy.
