= Seymour Sack =

American physicist and nuclear weapons designer (1929–2011)

- Born: September 8, 1929; New York City, U.S.
- Died: November 29, 2011 (aged 82); Berkeley, California, U.S.
- Education: Yale University
- Known for: Nuclear weapon primary design Two-dimensional design codes Insensitive high explosive integration Fire-resistant plutonium pits
- Awards: E. O. Lawrence Award (1973); Enrico Fermi Award (2003)
- Scientific career
- Fields: Physics; Nuclear weapons design
- Workplaces: Lawrence Livermore National Laboratory

Seymour Sack (September 8, 1929 – November 29, 2011) was an American physicist and nuclear weapons designer at Lawrence Livermore National Laboratory. Sack worked as a program manager and primary designer on the B77 nuclear bomb and the W84 thermonuclear warheads. For his work on nuclear weapon design, he was awarded the E. O. Lawrence Award in 1973 (currently awarded by the U.S. Department of Energy) and the presidential Enrico Fermi Award in 2003 for lifetime achievement in the field of nuclear energy.

== Early life and education ==
Sack was born on September 8, 1929, in New York City. Sack completed a Ph.D. dissertation at Yale University in 1954 titled Theory Of Low Energy Proton-alpha And Neutron-alpha Scattering.

== Career ==
Sack joined Livermore Radiation Laboratory, later renamed as Lawrence Livermore National Laboratory, in 1955 to focus on calculations of two-dimensional fluid dynamics, compressible flows, and shock phenomena. He first worked in the Theoretical Physics Division, and then he joined the B Division (small weapons) in 1964. Early in his career, he worked on the trigger or 'primary' of the weapons, and later he was a project manager and designer for several warheads. Sack retired from LLNL in 1990, but he continued to work as a laboratory associate; he remained active in weapons design, policy, and mentoring.

In 1995, Sack was one of several nuclear weapon designers on an independent JASON study on nuclear testing chaired by Sidney Drell. Sack participated in the study in his capacity as an LLNL nuclear weapon primary-stage designer and as project manager for the B83 nuclear bomb and W84 warheads. The JASON study considered and contributed work towards the Comprehensive Test Ban Treaty and stockpile planning. This was part of Sack's work on robustness in nuclear weapons design (i.e. the capability of a weapon to function reliably as designed, even under extreme environments), a topic on which he wrote internal articles. Sack's ideas contributed to the formulation of the quantification of margins and uncertainties (QMU) at LLNL. After retirement, Sack wrote about his opposition to renewed nuclear testing, based on technical grounds. Sack was recorded in videos for the preservation of his nuclear weapons knowledge, focusing on weapon models and explanations of design history.

== Nuclear weapons design ==
A focus of Sack's work was on the development of nuclear warheads that were safer to work with and around. He developed two-dimensional hydrodynamic codes to simulate the implosion process of nuclear devices, allowing for the design of more reliable and modern warheads. In the 1960s, his design was implemented for modern primary or trigger components (the primary is the first, fission bomb component that initiates the reaction to implode and detonate the second stage, fusion); this design was deployed in the Polaris warhead for the W58 primary. He also developed the use of Insensitive High Explosives (IHE) and fire-resistant plutonium pits, reducing risks in crash and fire accident scenarios, including nuclear detonation. Even later, he worked on the B83, W84, and W87 programs, and with the W87, his design implemented multiple safety innovations in a strategic missile warhead.

Among other safety innovations that Sack worked on, he directed integration of TATB into a nuclear weapon design in 1974, with his designs enabling the reliable use of TATB in nuclear weapons.

Sack also designed primaries for "miniature" bombs in the Poseidon submarine-launched ballistic missile and the Minuteman intercontinental ballistic missile, including work associated with the W62/Mk12 and W68/Mk3 programs. He later worked on safer air-carried and ground-launched cruise missile weapons, including the B83 and W84 programs.

== Awards and honors ==
Sack received the Ernest Orlando Lawrence Award in 1973 for his contributions to nuclear weapons theory, computer codes, design concepts, and stockpile engineering and testing. He received the Fleet Ballistic Missile Achievement Award in 1997 for work associated with W62 and W68 nuclear warheads, and the Y-12 Award of Excellence in 1990. Sack's received the presidential Enrico Fermi Award in 2003 for his career's work on nuclear weapons reliability and deterrence.
