= Ethyl methanesulfonate =

- Skeletal formula

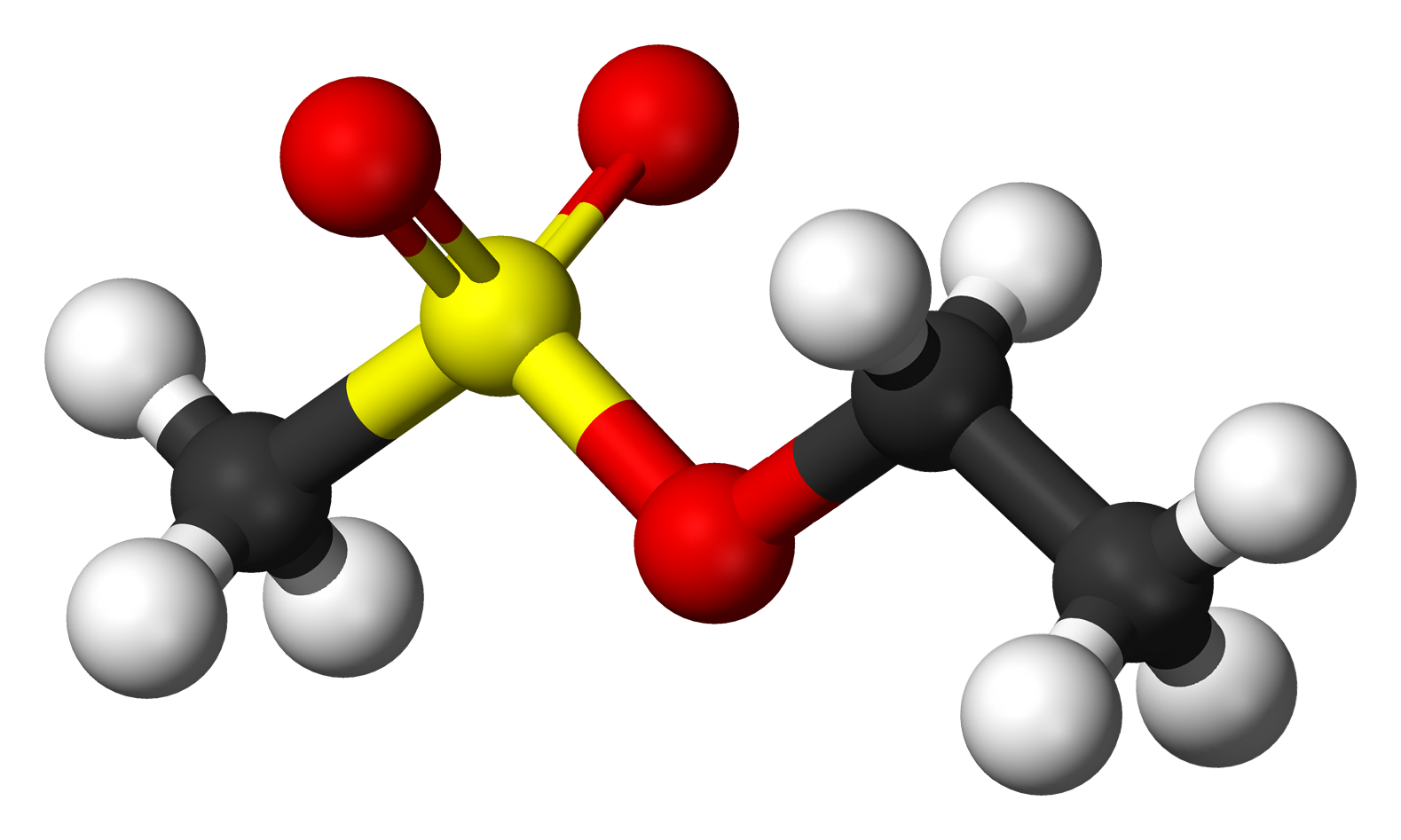
- Ball-and-stick model

Names
- Preferred IUPAC name Ethyl methanesulfonate
- Other names Ethyl mesylate Ethyl methanesulphonate

Identifiers
CAS Number	62-50-0
3D model (JSmol)	Interactive image
Abbreviations	EMS
ChEBI	CHEBI:23994
ChEMBL	ChEMBL338686
ChemSpider	5887
ECHA InfoCard	100.000.488
EC Number	200-536-7
KEGG	C19239
PubChem CID	6113
UNII	9H154DI0UP
CompTox Dashboard (EPA)	DTXSID6025309
- InChI: InChI=1S/C3H8O3S/c1-3-6-7(2,4)5/h3H2,1-2H3 Key: PLUBXMRUUVWRLT-UHFFFAOYSA-N; InChI=1/C3H8O3S/c1-3-6-7(2,4)5/h3H2,1-2H3 Key: PLUBXMRUUVWRLT-UHFFFAOYAM
- SMILES: O=S(=O)(OCC)C

Properties
Chemical formula	C_{3}H_{8}O_{3}S
Molar mass	124.15 g·mol^{−1}
Appearance	Clear colorless liquid
Density	1.1452 g/cm^{3} (22 °C)
Melting point	< 25 °C
Boiling point	85–86 °C (185–187 °F; 358–359 K) /10 mmHg(lit)
Vapor pressure	0.044 kPa @ 25˚C

Hazards
- GHS labelling
Pictograms	(GHS07: Exclamation mark) (GHS08: Health hazard)
Signal word	Danger
Hazard statements	H302, H340, H351
Precautionary statements	P203, P264, P270, P280, P301+P317, P318, P330, P405, P501
NFPA 704 (fire diamond)	1 1 0
- Except where otherwise noted, data are given for materials in their standard state (at 25 °C [77 °F], 100 kPa). verify (what is ?) Infobox references

Ethyl methanesulfonate (EMS) is an organosulfur compound with the formula CH_{3}SO_{3}C_{2}H_{5}. It is the ethyl ester of methanesulfonic acid. A colorless liquid, it is classified as an alkylating agent. EMS is the most commonly used chemical mutagen in experimental genetics. Mutations induced by EMS exposure can then be studied in genetic screens or other assays.

== Use in biological research ==
EMS produces random mutations in genetic material by nucleotide substitution; particularly through G:C to A:T transitions induced by guanine alkylation. EMS typically produces only point mutations. Due to its potency and well understood mutational spectrum, EMS can induce mutations at a rate of 5 × 10^{−4} to 5 × 10^{−2} per gene without substantial killing. A 5 × 10^{−4} per gene mutation rate observed in a typical EMS mutagenesis experiment of the model organism C. elegans, corresponds to a raw mutation rate of ~7 × 10^{−6} mutations per G/C base pair, or about 250 mutations within an originally mutagenized gamete (containing a ~100 Mbp, 36% GC haploid genome). Such a mutagenized gamete would have about 9 different loss-of-function mutations in genes, with 1 to 2 of these mutations being within essential genes and therefore lethal. However, since it is unlikely the same essential gene is mutated in independent gametes, and if loss of the essential gene did not kill the gamete itself, downstream gamete fusion often allows for survival of the resulting zygote and organism, as the now heterozygous non-functional mutated allele may be rescued by the still wildtype allele provided by the other gamete.

== Mechanism of mutagenesis ==
The ethyl group of EMS reacts with guanine in DNA, forming the abnormal base O^{6}-ethylguanine. During DNA replication, DNA polymerases that catalyze the process frequently place thymine, instead of cytosine, opposite O^{6}-ethylguanine. Following subsequent rounds of replication, the original G:C base pair can become an A:T pair (a transition mutation). This changes the genetic information, is often harmful to cells, and can result in disease. RNA polymerase can also place uridine (RNA analog of thymine) opposite an O^{6}-ethylguanine lesion.

== Repair of mutagenic lesion ==
O^{6}-ethylguanine can be repaired in vivo in a stoichiometric fashion by reacting with the active site cysteine of the O-6-methylguanine-DNA methyltransferase repair protein. The in vivo half-life of O^{6}-ethylguanine was reported to be about 9 days in mouse brain, while it was about 1 day in mouse liver.

== Induction of recombination ==
EMS induces mitotic recombination in Saccharomyces cerevisiae. It was suggested that EMS damage to DNA may result in a repair process leading to genetic exchange.

Bacteriophage T4 mutants defective in any one of six genes known to be required for genetic recombination were found to be more sensitive to inactivation by EMS than wild type bacteriophage. This finding suggests that a recombination process catalyzed by the proteins specified by these six genes is employed in repairing EMS lethal lesions in DNA.

== Stability ==
Generally speaking EMS is unstable in water. It hydrolyzes to ethanol and methanesulfonic acid. At neutral to acidic pH at room temperature, it has a fairly long half-life of over 1 day. Therefore, EMS must be specifically degraded before disposal. Protocols call for degradation of EMS in an equal volume of a 0.1M NaOH and 20% w/v sodium thiosulfate "inactivating solution", for at least six half-lives (>24 hours). The half-life of EMS in 1M NaOH is 6 hours at room temperature, while in a 10% w/v sodium thiosulfate solution it has a half-life of 1.4 hours.

== Safety ==
EMS is mutagenic, teratogenic, and carcinogenic

== See also ==
- Mutagenesis (molecular biology technique)
- MMS
- DMS
- ENU
