= Vilsmeier reagent =

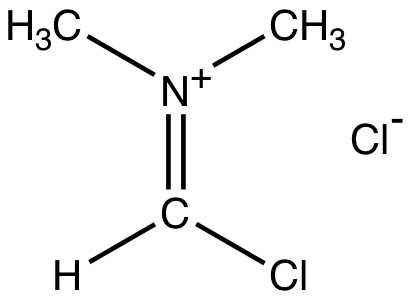

Names
- Preferred IUPAC name 1-Chloro-N,N-dimethylmethaniminium chloride
- Other names (chloromethylene)dimethyliminium chloride

Identifiers
CAS Number	3724-43-4 hydrate
3D model (JSmol)	Interactive image
ChEMBL	ChEMBL3183181
ChemSpider	69730
ECHA InfoCard	100.102.443
EC Number	425-970-6
PubChem CID	77311
UNII	Q39V7G8776
CompTox Dashboard (EPA)	DTXSID7044423
- InChI: InChI=1S/C3H7ClN.ClH/c1-5(2)3-4;/h3H,1-2H3;1H/q+1;/p-1 Key: QQVDYSUDFZZPSU-UHFFFAOYSA-M
- SMILES: C[N+](=CCl)C.[Cl-]

Properties
Chemical formula	C_{3}H_{7}Cl_{2}N
Molar mass	128.00 g·mol^{−1}
Appearance	white solid
Melting point	132 °C (270 °F; 405 K)

Hazards
- GHS labelling
Pictograms	(GHS05: Corrosive) (GHS07: Exclamation mark) (GHS08: Health hazard)
Signal word	Danger
Hazard statements	H290, H302, H314, H360
Precautionary statements	P201, P202, P234, P260, P264, P270, P280, P281, P301+P312, P301+P330+P331, P303+P361+P353, P304+P340, P305+P351+P338, P308+P313, P310, P321, P330, P363, P390, P404, P405, P501
- Except where otherwise noted, data are given for materials in their standard state (at 25 °C [77 °F], 100 kPa). Infobox references

The Vilsmeier reagent is an organic compound with the formula [(CH_{3})_{2}NCHCl]Cl. It is a salt consisting of the N,N-dimethyliminium cation ([(CH_{3})_{2}N=CHCl]^{+}) and chloride anion. Depending on the particular reaction, the anion can vary. In typical POCl_{3}-based reactions, the anion is PO_{2}Cl_{2}^{−}. The iminium cation [(CH_{3})_{2}N=CHCl]^{+} is the reactive component of interest. This iminium species is a derivative of the imidoyl chloride CH_{3}N=CHCl. Analogues of this particular reagent are generated when tertiary amides other than DMF are treated with POCl_{3}.

The salt is a white solid that is soluble in polar organic solvents. Vilsmeier reagent is the active intermediate in the formylation reactions, the Vilsmeier reaction or Vilsmeier-Haack reaction that use mixtures of dimethylformamide and phosphorus oxychloride to generate the Vilsmeier reagent, which in turn is attacked by a nucleophilic substrate and eventually hydrolyzes to give formyl. It is a source of "O=CH^{+}".

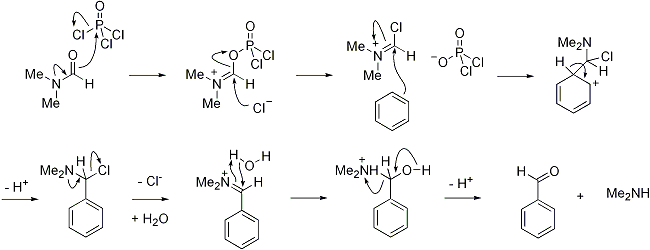
Pathway for formation of Vilsmeier reagent and its mode of action.

== See also ==
- Eschenmoser's salt, [(CH_{3})_{2}NCH_{2}]I
