= Enrico Fermi Award =

Award

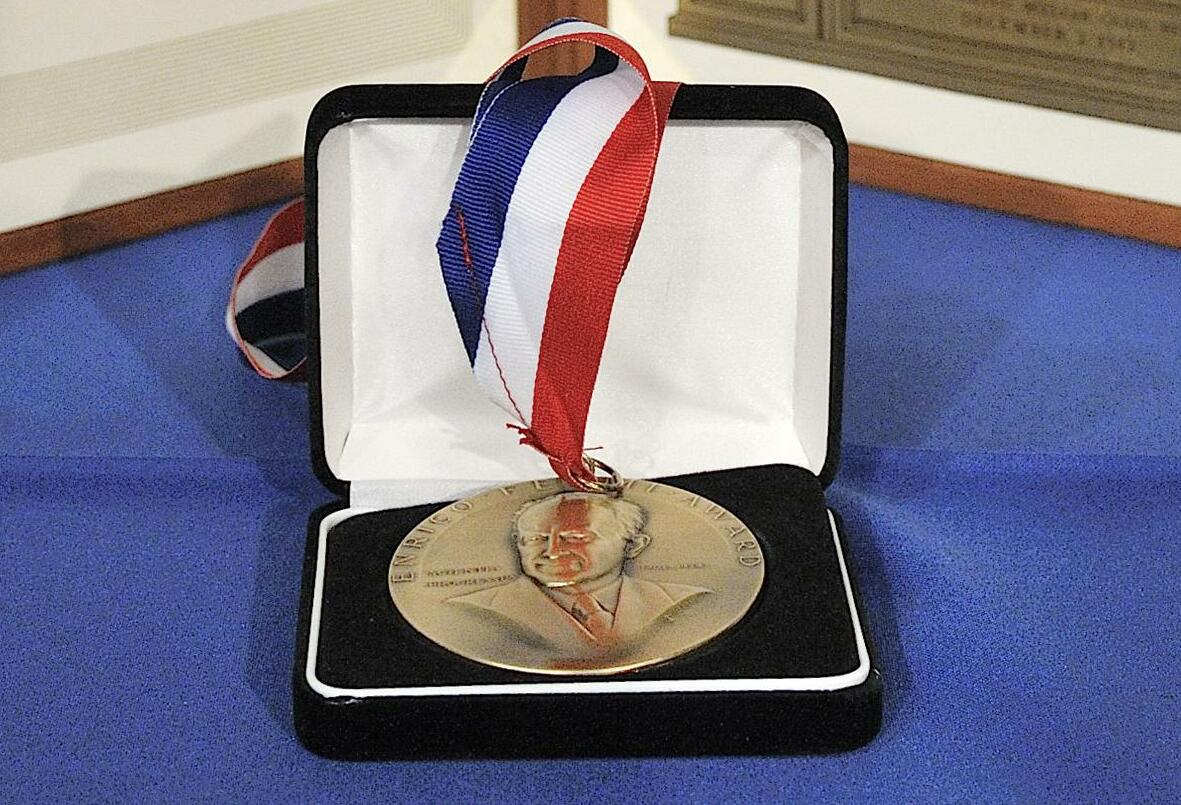
Enrico Fermi Award

The Enrico Fermi Award is a scientific award conferred by the President of the United States. It is awarded to honor scientists of international stature for their lifetime achievement in the development, use or production of energy. It was established in 1956 by the Atomic Energy Commission in memorial of Italian-American physicist Enrico Fermi and his work in the development of nuclear power.

The award has been administered through the Department of Energy since its establishment in 1977. The recipient of the award receives $100,000, a certificate signed by the President and the Secretary of Energy and a gold medal featuring the likeness of Enrico Fermi.

== Winners ==
- 1956 – John von Neumann
- 1957 – Ernest O. Lawrence
- 1958 – Eugene P. Wigner
- 1959 – Glenn T. Seaborg
- 1961 – Hans A. Bethe
- 1962 – Edward Teller
- 1963 – J. Robert Oppenheimer
- 1964 – Hyman G. Rickover
- 1966 – Lise Meitner; Otto Hahn; Fritz Strassmann
- 1968 – John A. Wheeler
- 1969 – Walter Zinn
- 1970 – Norris E. Bradbury
- 1971 – Shields Warren; Stafford L. Warren
- 1972 – Manson Benedict
- 1976 – William L. Russell
- 1978 – Wolfgang K. H. Panofsky; Harold M. Agnew
- 1980 – Rudolf E. Peierls; Alvin M. Weinberg
- 1981 – W. Bennett Lewis
- 1982 – Herbert L. Anderson; Seth Neddermeyer
- 1983 – Alexander Hollaender; John H. Lawrence
- 1984 – Robert R. Wilson; Georges Vendryes
- 1985 – Norman Rasmussen; Marshall Rosenbluth
- 1986 – Ernest Courant; M. Stanley Livingston
- 1987 – Luis Alvarez; Gerald F. Tape
- 1988 – Richard B. Setlow; Victor F. Weisskopf
- 1990 – George A. Cowan; Robley D. Evans
- 1992 – Harold Brown; John S. Foster, Jr.; Leon M. Lederman
- 1993 – Liane B. Russell; Freeman Dyson
- 1995 – Ugo Fano; Martin D. Kamen
- 1996 – Mortimer M. Elkind; H. Rodney Withers; Richard L. Garwin
- 1998 – Maurice Goldhaber; Michael E. Phelps
- 2000 – Sheldon Datz; Sidney D. Drell; Herbert F. York
- 2003 – John N. Bahcall; Raymond Davis, Jr.; Seymour Sack
- 2005 – Arthur H. Rosenfeld
- 2009 – John B. Goodenough; Siegfried Hecker
- 2012 – Mildred Dresselhaus; Burton Richter
- 2013 – Andrew Sessler; Allen J. Bard
- 2014 – Claudio Pellegrini; Charles V. Shank
- 2023 – Darleane C. Hoffman; Gabor A. Somorjai
- 2024 – Héctor D. Abruña; Paul Alivisatos; John H. Nuckolls

== See also ==
- List of engineering awards
- Prizes named after people
- List of things named after Enrico Fermi
- Vannevar Bush Award
