= N-Nitroso-N-methylurea =

- Skeletal formula of N-nitroso-N-methylurea

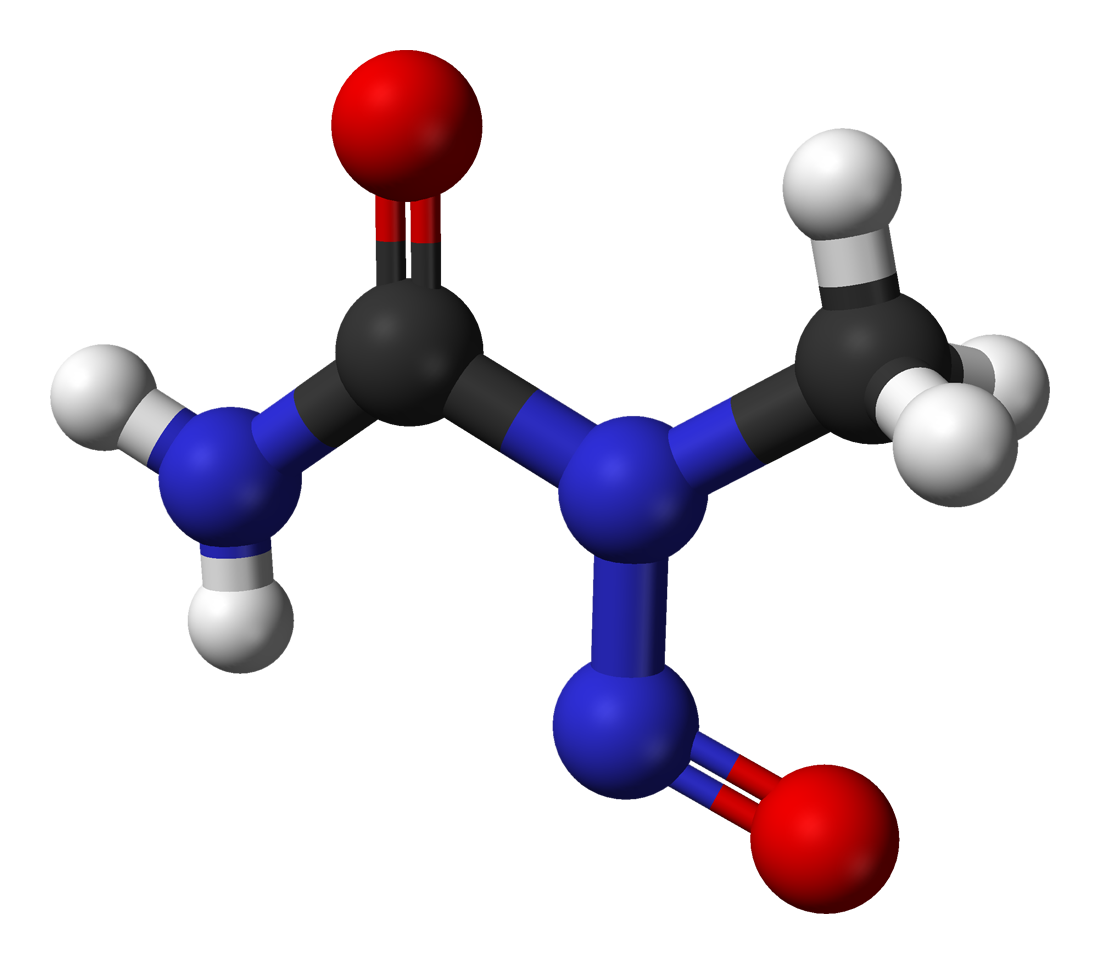
Ball and stick model of N-nitroso-N-methylurea
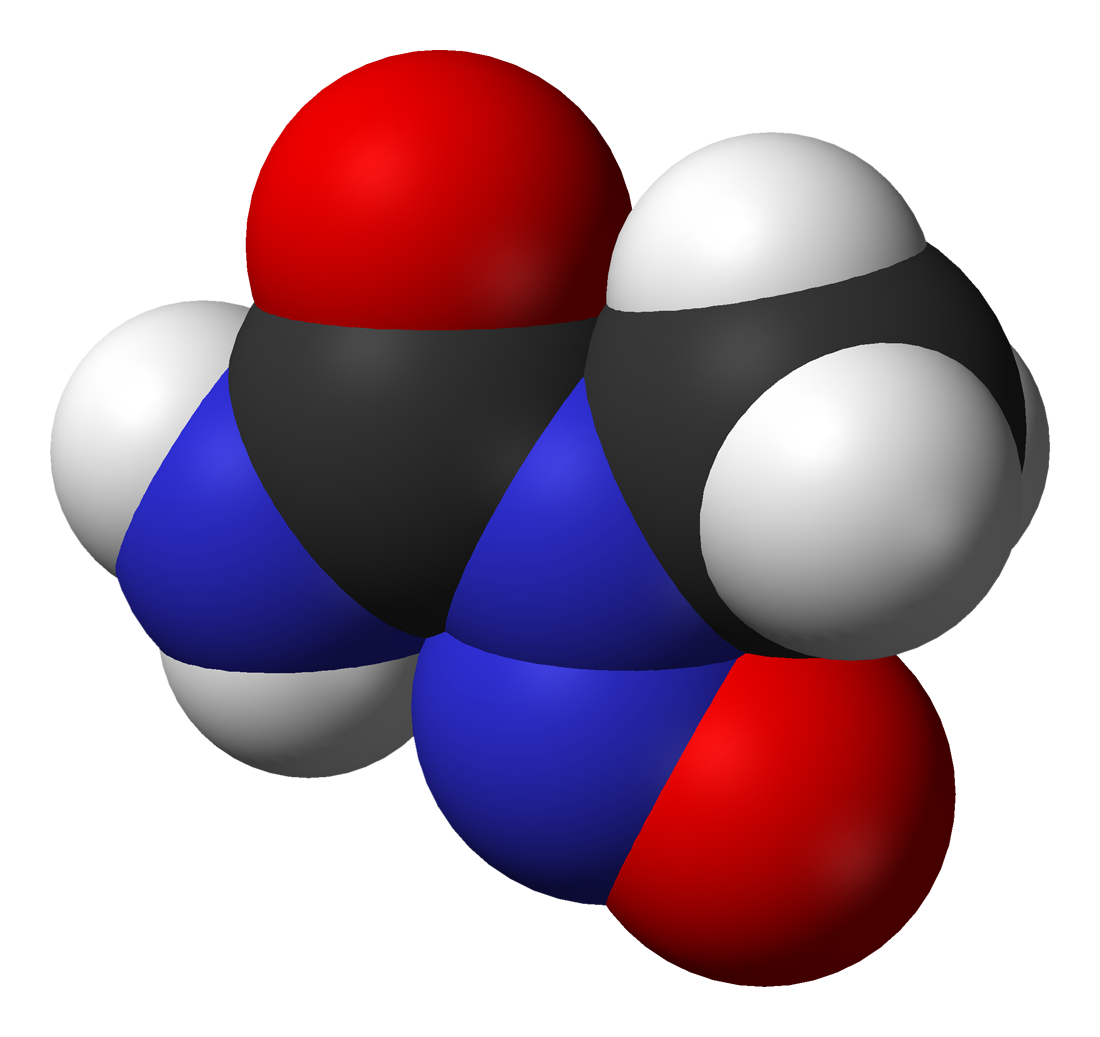
Spacefill model of N-nitroso-N-methylurea

Names
- Preferred IUPAC name N-Methyl-N-nitrosourea
- Other names 1-Methyl-1-nitrosourea; N-Methyl-N-nitrosourea

Identifiers
CAS Number	684-93-5
3D model (JSmol)	Interactive image
Abbreviations	NMU
Beilstein Reference	1756040
ChEBI	CHEBI:50102
ChEMBL	ChEMBL288958
ChemSpider	12177
ECHA InfoCard	100.010.618
EC Number	211-678-4
KEGG	C14595
MeSH	Methylnitrosourea
PubChem CID	12699
UNII	W8KW4E3XSU
CompTox Dashboard (EPA)	DTXSID4021006
- InChI: InChI=1S/C2H5N3O2/c1-5(4-7)2(3)6/h1H3,(H2,3,6) Key: ZRKWMRDKSOPRRS-UHFFFAOYSA-N
- SMILES: CN(N=O)C(N)=O

Properties
Chemical formula	C_{2}H_{5}N_{3}O_{2}
Molar mass	103.081 g·mol^{−1}
log P	−0.302
Acidity (pK_{a})	12.365
Basicity (pK_{b})	1.632

Related compounds
Related ureas	ENU
Related compounds	N-Methylformamide; Dimethylformamide; Deuterated DMF
- Except where otherwise noted, data are given for materials in their standard state (at 25 °C [77 °F], 100 kPa). verify (what is ?) Infobox references

N-Nitroso-N-methylurea (NMU) is a highly reliable carcinogen, mutagen, and teratogen. NMU is an alkylating agent, and exhibits its toxicity by transferring its methyl group to nucleobases in nucleic acids, which can lead to AT:GC transition mutations.

NMU is the traditional precursor in the synthesis of diazomethane. It has the potentially advantageous property that the stoichiometric byproducts formed are water, carbon dioxide, and ammonia, which are innocuous or easily removed. However, because it is unstable at temperatures beyond 20 °C and somewhat shock-sensitive, it has become obsolete for this purpose and replaced by other N-nitroso compounds: (N-methyl)nitrosamides and nitrosamines. Most chemical supply houses have stopped carrying it.

Acute exposure to NMU in humans can result in skin and eye irritation, headache, nausea, and vomiting. NMU is reasonably anticipated to be a human carcinogen based on sufficient evidence of carcinogenicity in experimental animals (IARC 1972, 1978, 1987). Various cancers induced in animal models include: squamous cell carcinomas of the forestomach, sarcomas and gliomas of the brain, adenocarcinomas of the pancreas, prostate cancer, mammary carcinomas, leukemia, and lymphomas. However, the actual potential for human exposure is quite limited, as the chemical is not produced or used in large quantities.

NMU is teratogenic and embryotoxic, resulting in craniofacial (cleft palate) and skeletal defects, fetal growth retardation, and increased fetal resorption. Exposure to NMU during pre-implantation, post-implantation, organogenesis, or by paternal exposure can result in these effects.
