= Liane Russell =

American geneticist

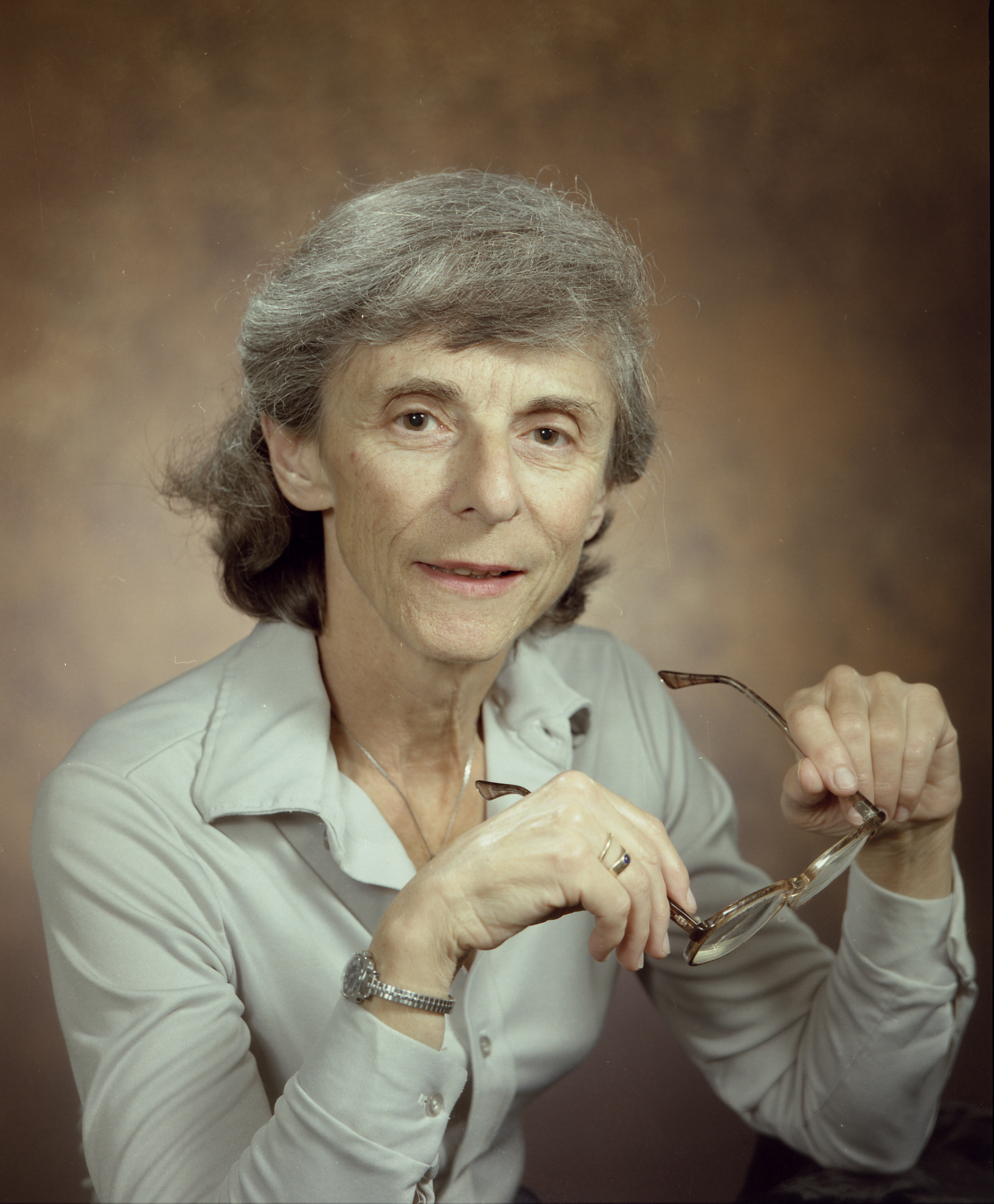
- Born: Liane Brauch; August 27, 1923; Vienna, Austria
- Died: July 20, 2019 (aged 95); Oak Ridge, Tennessee, U.S.
- Education: University of Chicago
- Spouse: William L. Russell
- Awards: Enrico Fermi Award (1993), Marjory Stoneman Douglas Award (1992)
- Scientific career
- Fields: Genetics, Conservation Movement

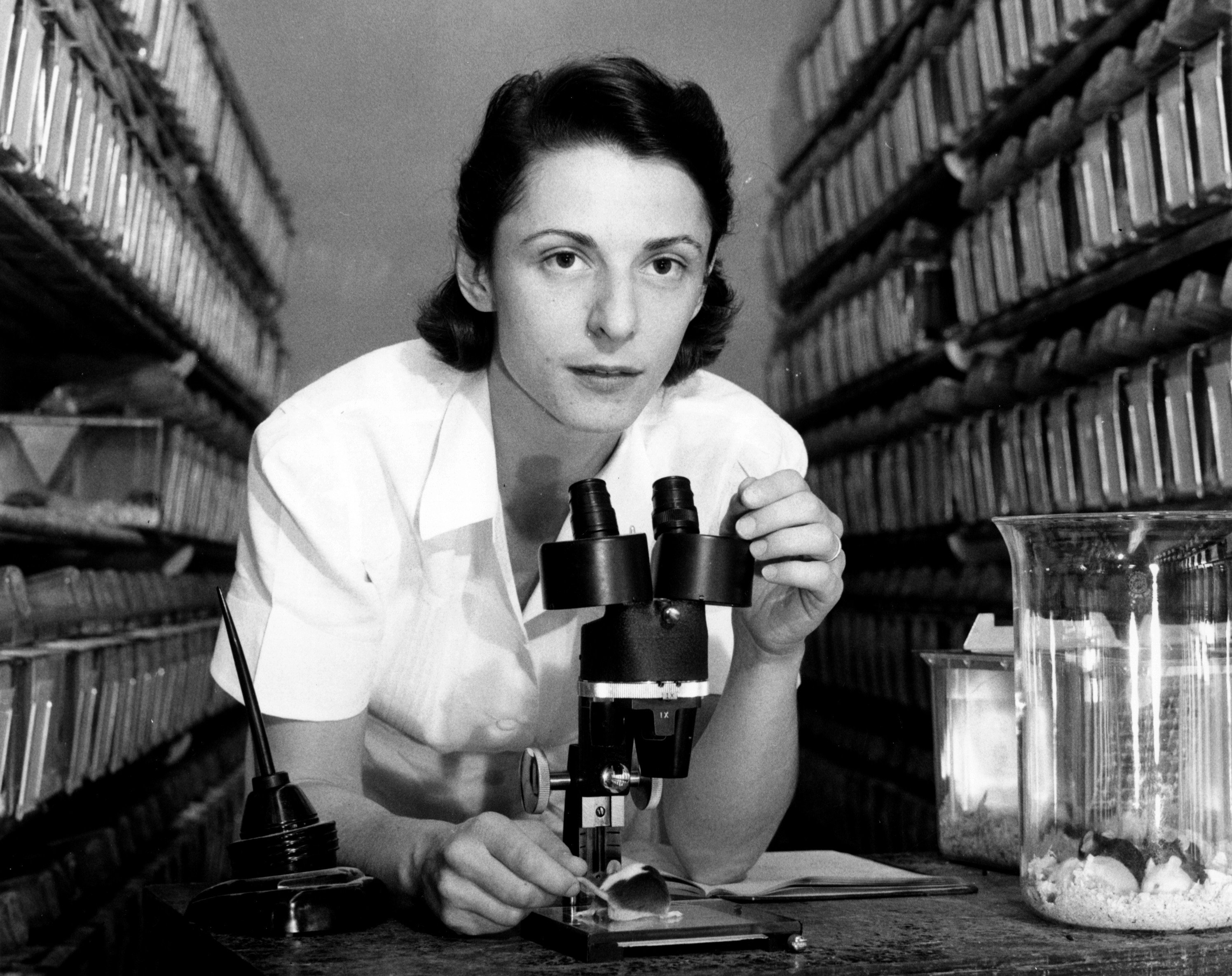
1959: Y chromosome discovery

Liane Brauch "Lee" Russell (August 27, 1923 – July 20, 2019) was an Austrian-born American geneticist and conservationist. Her studies in mammalian genetics provided the basis for understanding the chromosomic basis for sex determination in mammals and the effects occasioned by radiation, drugs, fuels and waste on mice. Her research allowed better understanding of genetic processes in mammals, mutagenesis and teratogenesis effects on mammals, and knowledge of how these processes can be prevented and avoided. She determined that developing embryos were most vulnerable to the effects of radiation during the first seven weeks of pregnancy and therefore recommended that non-urgent diagnostic X-rays be taken in the 14 days after the onset of a woman's menstrual period, a standard that became internationally accepted in radiological practice. She was also the first to discover that the Y chromosome determines maleness in mammals.

Her conservation activities resulted in the protection of many wild and scenic places, especially those near her adopted home of East Tennessee.

== Early life ==
Russell was born as Liane Brauch in 1923 in Vienna, Austria, to a Jewish household, the oldest of three children to Clara (Starer) and Arthur Brauch. Her father was a chemist and her mother was a singing teacher. From the age of 3 to 15, the family lived on the Wiedner Hauptstrasse, not far from the Vienna Opera. There were frequent musical gatherings in the apartment, and the family enjoyed skiing and other outings in the Alps. One of her childhood playmates was first cousin, Robert Starer, Austrian-born American composer and pianist. Her somewhat idyllic childhood abruptly came to an end on the evening of March 12, 1938, but her family stayed in Vienna even after the Anschluss. Through a secret scheme, which involved the surrender of her father's business to the Nazis, the immediate family (father, mother, younger sister and younger brother) were able to escape to London. She moved to the United States in 1941 and became a naturalized American citizen in 1946.

She met zoologist William L. Russell during a college summer school program, where he was her mentor. They married and worked together as geneticists at Jackson Laboratory and Oak Ridge National Laboratory. Together they had two children, a son, David "Ace" (b. 1950) and a daughter, Evelyn (b. 1952).

== Education ==
Russell completed her secondary schooling in England. After the family moved to the United States, she earned an A.B. from Hunter College in New York City in 1945 and her Ph.D. in Zoology in 1949 at the University of Chicago.

Her first job was baby sitting while she studied in college; after that she worked as a receptionist in a doctor's office after class.

== Career ==
Russell’s career began in 1943 when she became a research assistant at the Jackson Memorial Laboratory in Bar Harbor, Maine. Through this role, Russell learned more about genetics and met William Russell, a leading geneticist at the time. William later became Russell’s research partner and husband.

In 1947, Russell and her husband moved to eastern Tennessee to work at the Oak Ridge National Laboratory. Ironically, this was the lab that was deemed the headquarters of the Manhattan Project - the World War II mission to create the atomic bomb. Russell arrived at ORNL two years after the United States of America bombed Hiroshima and Nagasaki. The atomic bombs unleashed an interest in many scientists to study the impacts the bombs have on humans. Through the studies being conducted on the impacts of radiation, Russell became passionate about teratology - the study of congenital abnormalities and abnormalities. Russell and her husband utilized her passion for teratology to begin testing the impacts of radiation on mice. Their rationale for this was that mice are extremely similar to humans in that they share about 80% of their genes with humans and go through similar human processes. Eventually, Russell and her husband established the “Mouse House”.

The Mouse House was home to 200,000 mice used for genetic research. Russell’s experiments with mice allowed her to make numerous discoveries about fetal development in humans. For instance, Russell discovered that a group of mice embryos who had been exposed to radiation at the same time all developed the same foot deformity. Translating this research to humans, Russell discovered that developing fetuses are most vulnerable to radiation during the first seven weeks of pregnancy. This discovery allowed doctors to advise their female patients who could potentially be pregnant to undergo non-urgent x-rays fourteen days after she experiences her menstrual cycle. This advice has been adopted by doctors around the world and has saved countless pregnancies.

An additional discovery made by Russell was that the Y chromosome present in a mammal fetus made the fetus a male. Other scientists had discovered that the chromosomes a fetus has represents its gender, but Russell was the first to make the revelation about the connection between the male gender and the Y chromosome. Through Russell’s discovery, scientists were able to conduct additional research about genetics and genetic abnormalities through the Y chromosome. This also led to the discovery that the presence of a Y chromosome in a human fetus made the fetus a male.

Russell’s successful career led her to receive numerous awards. In 1973, Russell was awarded the Roentgen Medal, presented to her by the University of Würzburg. A little over ten years later, Russell was inducted into the National Academy of Sciences which is one of the highest honors a scientist can receive in their lifetime. Finally, Russell was awarded one of the greatest honors as she received the Enrico Fermi Award from the United States Department of Energy. All of these achievements culminate in the ORNL creating a mouse research lab named after Russell and her husband - the William L. and Liane B. Russell Laboratory for Comparative and Functional Genomics.

== Activism ==
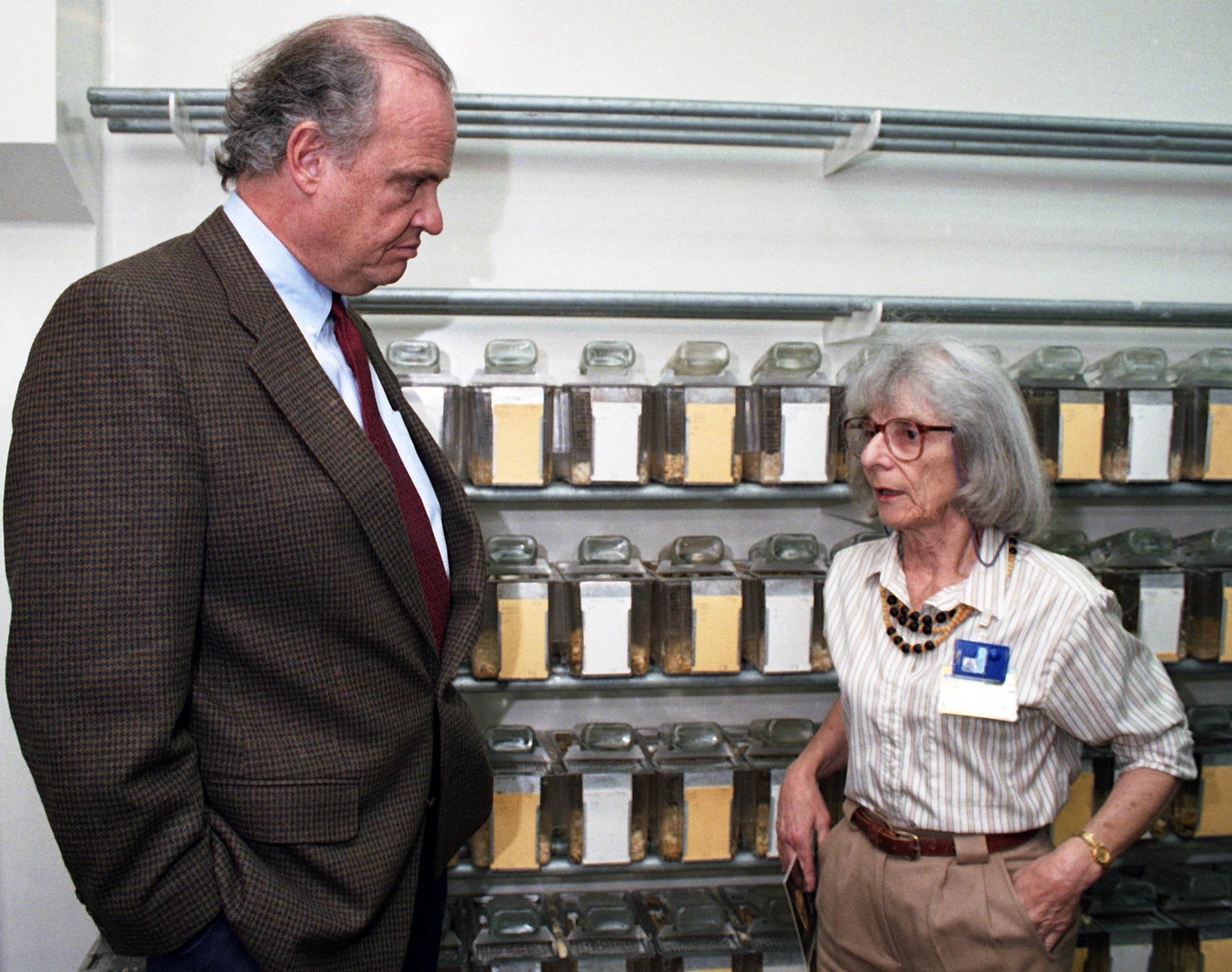
Liane Russell (right) and Fred Thompson, 1996.

Russell was also a conservationist working for protection of wilderness and national lands and rivers. In 1966 she helped to organize the Tennessee Citizens for Wilderness Planning (TCWP). In 1976 TCWP helped to obtain protection of the 125,000-acre Big South Fork National River and Recreation Area and obtain National Wild and Scenic River designation for the Obed River. In 1992 Russell received the National Parks Conservation Association's (NPCA's) Marjory Stoneman Douglas award.

== Summary ==
Liane Brauch Russell was born in 1923 to a Jewish family in Vienna, Austria. Her father was a chemical engineer while her mother taught singing, and she was the oldest out of her two other siblings. As a child, her parents were very encouraging of Liane's inquiring mind and constantly reminded her that girls could do anything boys could do. However, despite her parents' evident kind-heartedness, the world was at a loss for morality during the later years of Liane's childhood. In 1938, Austria was annexed by the Nazis, and due to Liane's Jewish heritage, she and her family were forced to flee Austria to London. Liane and her family lost their house and possessions, and her father even lost his entire business to the Nazi regime.

After several years in England, Liane moved to the United States, where she decided to further her education at Hunter College in New York City. She studied chemistry and biology and completed a summer research assistantship at Jackson Laboratory, a biomedical research institution that focuses on studying human biology and genomics. Interestingly enough, through the assistantship, her supervisor, William Russell, a leading geneticist at the time, would later become both Liane's husband and research partner.

Upon graduation from Hunter College in 1945, Liane went back to Jackson Laboratory before moving to the University of Chicago to pursue her Ph.D. in Zoology. After initiating her Ph.D., Liane went to work at the Oak Ridge National Laboratory in Tennessee, which played a vital role in the development of nuclear weapons through the Manhattan Project in WWII. Liane was fortunate enough to work alongside her husband, William Russell, as they both had a mission to study the effects of radiation exposure on mice.

Mice share various genetic qualities with humans and thus were the perfect test subjects for Liane's radiation experiments. The essential pain point Liane was looking to solve was that the current information surrounding the effects of radiation on congenital disabilities was insufficient and inconclusive. Essentially, Liane was looking to innovate on recent research and prove the harmful effects that radiation can have on humans. Thus, she began researching how radiation affects mice embryos at certain stages in their development. Through this research, Liane discovered a variety of different deformities that would arise within the embryos at different stages of growth. Through Liane's findings, she determined that the most critical time of human gestation is within the first two to six weeks, during which most women do not even know they are pregnant.

Both Liane and her husband published a paper describing their findings. The report recommended that women who may be pregnant only receive specific radiological procedures during the two weeks after their last menstrual cycle when they are most likely not pregnant. The paper was published in 1952 and received heavy criticism and controversy from radiologists. However, despite heavy criticism, the innovative research that both Liane and her husband performed became known as the 14-day rule and became a radiological practice accepted in almost every country. And to this day, this innovative rule is still a prominent rule among radiologists internationally. These findings have protected millions of pregnant women from premature radiation procedures that would have had detrimental effects on their pregnancies and children in the 1950s and up to the present day.

Furthermore, Liane received a variety of awards for her research. She was awarded the Roentgen Medal in 1973, became a member of the National Academy of Sciences in 1986, and received the Enrico Fermi Award from the Department of Energy in 1994. Likewise, the Oak Ridge National Laboratory created the Liane B. Russell Distinguished Early Career Fellowship, a program primarily for minority and female scientists who help them get early exposure to various scientific fields. Liane Russell discovered the harmful effects of radiation on developing embryos.

== Awards ==
- Roentgen Medal, 1973
- Hunter College Hall of Fame, 1979
- Marjory Stoneman Douglas Award, 1992
- Environmental Mutagen Society Award, 1993
- Enrico Fermi award in 1993
- National Academy of Sciences, Election Year: 1986.
