= Anton Vilsmeier =

German chemist (1894–1962)

- Born: 12 June 1894; Burgweinting, German Empire (now part of Regensburg, Germany)
- Died: 12 February 1962 (aged 67); Ludwigshafen, West Germany
- Education: Ludwig-Maximilians-Universität München, University of Erlangen
- Known for: Vilsmeier-Haack reaction
- Scientific career
- Workplaces: University of Erlangen, BASF
- Doctoral advisor: Ernst Otto Fischer

Dr. Anton Vilsmeier (12 June 1894 – 12 February 1962) was a German chemist who together with Albrecht Haack discovered the Vilsmeier-Haack reaction.

== Early life ==
Anton Vilsmeier was born to the mill owner, Wolfgang Vilsmeier, and his wife, Philomena, in Burgweinting, Oberpfalz. He attended the Volksschule and the Altes Gymnasium in Regensburg. During World War I, he served in the 11th Bavarian Infantry Regiment, and became a British prisoner following the Battle of the Somme, returning to Germany in November 1919. From 1920, he studied chemistry at the Ludwig-Maximilians-Universität München, and from 1922 at the University of Erlangen, where he continued as an assistant after his studies.

== Career ==
Vilsmeier discovered the aldehyde synthesis reaction which bears his name in 1926, and it was published in 1927, the year that he began to work for BASF in Ludwigshafen. He retired in 1959, and died in 1962 in Ludwigshafen.
