= William L. Russell (geneticist) =

British-American geneticist (1910–2003)

- Born: August 19, 1910
- Died: July 23, 2003 (aged 92)
- Education: University of Oxford; University of Chicago
- Known for: Specific-locus test Radiation mutagenesis in mice Genetic risk assessment
- Awards: Enrico Fermi Award (1976)
- Scientific career
- Fields: Genetics; Radiation biology
- Institutions: Jackson Laboratory; Oak Ridge National Laboratory
- Doctoral advisor: Sewall Wright

William Lawson Russell (August 19, 1920 – July 23, 2003), known as Bill Russell, was a mammalian geneticist focused on mutagenesis and radiation effects in mice. Russell had a long career at Oak Ridge National Laboratory studying the genetic effects of radiation and chemicals. He developed the specific-locus test in mice for measuring mutation rates. Russell's work was used as the basis for radiation risk standards in humans. For his contributions in these areas, Russell was elected to the National Academy of Sciences in 1973 and given the Enrico Fermi Award in 1976.

== Early life and education ==
Russell was born in Newhaven, United Kingdom, and received his undergraduate degree in zoology from Oxford University in 1932. He went to graduate school at the University of Chicago, where he studied under Sewall Wright, receiving a Ph.D. in zoology in 1937.

== Career ==
He joined the Jackson Laboratory in Bar Harbor, Maine as a researcher, where he worked from 1937 to 1947. He then moved to Oak Ridge National Laboratory in 1947, working as a mouse geneticist, and establishing a large-scale mammalian genetics research program. Together with his second wife geneticist Liane Russell, he built and led a mouse-based mutagenesis research facility. This facility was built within the Y-12 National Security Complex. Russell retired officially in 1977 due to a mandatory retirement age of 65 but he continued to perform activities in research for another ~15 years.

== Research and major contributions ==
Russell's work focused on mammalian radiation genetics and mutation rates. He developed the specific-locus test to detect mutations at defined gene loci in mice. The specific-locus test measured mutation rates in mice by mating mutagen-exposed wildtype animals with mice carrying recessive alleles at one of up to seven marker genes such as altered coat color or short ears. In the offspring from this cross, a newly induced mutation at one of the marker loci yields the recessive (and visible) trait; this allows for rapid and large-scale screening for radiation- and chemical-induced mutations, and the test requires no specialized equipment.

As part of his work on mouse genetics, he helped establish a large-scale mouse colony known as the "Mouse House" (~250,000 mice at its peak) at Oak Ridge National Laboratory (ORNL) for mutation studies; he was recruited to ORNL to build this resource and use it to advance mutation studies. In his work on radiation-induced mutations and mutation rates in mammals, he measured and calculated dose-rate effect and mutation mechanisms, showing that mutation frequency depends on radiation dose rate, as measured in spermatogonial stem cells.

His work provided early evidence for the repair of premutational DNA damage. He demonstrated differences in the mutation response between male and female germ cells.

He was also among the first researchers to study chemical mutagenesis, and he was notable for the demonstrated high mutagenic potency of N-ethyl-N-nitrosourea (ENU), work he performed in mouse germ cells. This was part of his work to generate dose-response data for chemical mutagens in mammals.

The longer term impact of his work was that the results were used to estimate the genetic risks of radiation exposure in humans. These data informed international radiation safety standards and regulatory frameworks.

== Honors and awards ==
- Elected to National Academy of Sciences (1973)
- Enrico Fermi Award (1976)
- Environmental Mutagen Society Award (1989)
- Roentgen Medal (1973)
- Distinguished Service Award, Health Physics Society (1976)

Russell also served as president of the Genetics Society of America (1965).

== Personal life ==
Russell's first wife was Elizabeth "Tibby" Russell, whom he met at the University of Chicago as a fellow graduate student of Sewall Wright and married in 1937. They moved together to work at the Jackson Laboratory, and had four children before divorcing in 1947. Tibby later served as president of the Genetics Society of America, and was elected to the National Academy of Sciences.

He subsequently married geneticist Liane Russell, who had also worked at the Jackson Laboratory and was a student in his lab. She was a long-term scientific collaborator (and was also elected to the National Academy of Sciences); they moved together to join Oak Ridge National Laboratory where together they studied the impact of radiation on mice. They had two children.

Bill and Liane were active in environmental conservation and they co-founded the nonprofit group known as Tennessee Citizens for Wilderness Planning, which was involved in preservation of river and wilderness areas in Tennessee.
