= Bruce Macintosh Cattanach =

British mouse geneticist (1932–2020)

Bruce Macintosh Cattanach FRS
- Born: 5 November 1932; Glasgow, Scotland
- Died: 8 April 2020 (aged 87)
- Education: Heaton Grammar School, Newcastle upon Tyne; Durham University; Institute of Genetics, Edinburgh (Ph.D.)
- Known for: Work on autosomal imprinting and X chromosome inactivation.
- Spouses: Margaret Bouchier Crewe (d. 1996); Jo Peters
- Parents: James Cattanach (father); Margaretta May Cattanach (née Fyffe) (mother)
- Scientific career
- Fields: Mouse genetics
- Institutions: MRC Harwell; Institute of Animal Genetics, Edinburgh; Oak Ridge National Laboratory, Tennessee; City of Hope Medical Center, Duarte, California
- Doctoral advisor: Charlotte Auerbach
- Other academic advisors: Robert G. Edwards

Bruce Macintosh Cattanach FRS (5 November 1932 – 8 April 2020) was a British mouse geneticist, known for his pioneering work in the fields of autosomal imprinting and X chromosome inactivation.

With contemporaries that included Mary Lyon FRS (who discovered X chromosome inactivation), Bruce’s research career was based at MRC Harwell. He would go on to serve as acting director of the new Mammalian Genetics Unit in 1996.

He was elected Fellow of the Royal Society in 1987, and the Bruce Cattanach Prize was launched by the Genetics Society in 2022.

== Research ==
=== Mutagenesis ===
Cattanach centered a portion of his work on mutagenesis, the process of mutations causing changes in the genetic material of an organism, where he found numerous mutants of interest useful in research. One example is Bruce’s identification of the hpg genetic variant mouse model. His research group noticed a strain of mice with underdeveloped reproductive organs, which they realized was caused by them lacking a hormone called hypothalamic GnRH (gonadotropin-releasing hormone) because the GnRH gene had a part of it missing. As a result, there were also reduced levels of other key reproductive hormones. The discovery of this mice strain was impactful since it could be used as an animal model to help study human conditions such as hypogonadotropic hypogonadism, where no or not enough sex hormones are produced.

=== Autosomal Imprinting ===
One of Cattanach’s greatest contributions is his discovery and foundational work of autosomal imprinting. Autosomal imprinting describes the phenomenon that gene expression is dependent on whether the genes come from the male or female parent. Although the evidence of autosomal imprinting has been observed in previous research, Cattanach was the first to recognize its significance and to investigate its mechanism in mice. Cattanach first noticed signs of autosomal imprinting in his experiment to measure the failure of sister chromatids separation during miosis in mice. Cattanach identified the particular regions of chromosomes that are essential for autosomal imprinting. Despite Cattanach’s dislike of mapping in general, he used a mice stock with various chromosomal translocation and deletion from his earlier mutagenesis work to map the whole genome and search for imprinted genes. By Cattanach’s retirement in 1998, he had identified 11 regions that carry imprinting genes on 6 different chromosomes.

=== Dog Breeding and Genetics ===
Bruce also had a passion for dog breeding and genetics. Wondering if there was a way to breed Boxers to have naturally short tails without having to dock them, he attempted to cross breed a Corgi and a Boxer. Cattanach’s experiment showed that transferring a gene between breeds could be easy and can cause physical changes; in this case, it was a dog’s version of the T gene which, when disrupted, results in developing short tails. He also investigated canine genetic diseases. Bruce found that the STRN gene variant is not what actually causes heart disease in Boxers, but is instead a marker that can be used to identify or track it.

=== X inactivation and X-chromosome controlling element ===
Cattanach's discovery of the “Cattanach's translocation” in a mouse model, involves the relocation of a piece of chromosome 7 into the X chromosome, which led to the observation of mosaic female mice, mice that displays both dark and white fur due to different genetic make up, which were later called "flecked" mice. Upon further investigation with Susumo Ohno, they were able find that the "flecked" mice phenotype was due to X chromosome inactivation, which is a natural phenomenon where all except one X chromosome and its genes are silenced when an organism has more than one X chromosome. The "flecked" mice helped verify Mary Lyon's hypotheses on the natural mosaicism, meaning cells from the same organism have a different genetic make up, in female mammals due to X inactivation. Further research also lead to the discovery of the X-chromosome controlling element, Xce, providing a potential mechanistic explanation of how the insertion of previously active genes into a silenced X chromosome are also inactivated. Overall, his research on X chromosomes contributed to the understanding of X chromosome inactivation and mosaicism.
