= Gerald F. Tape =

American physicist

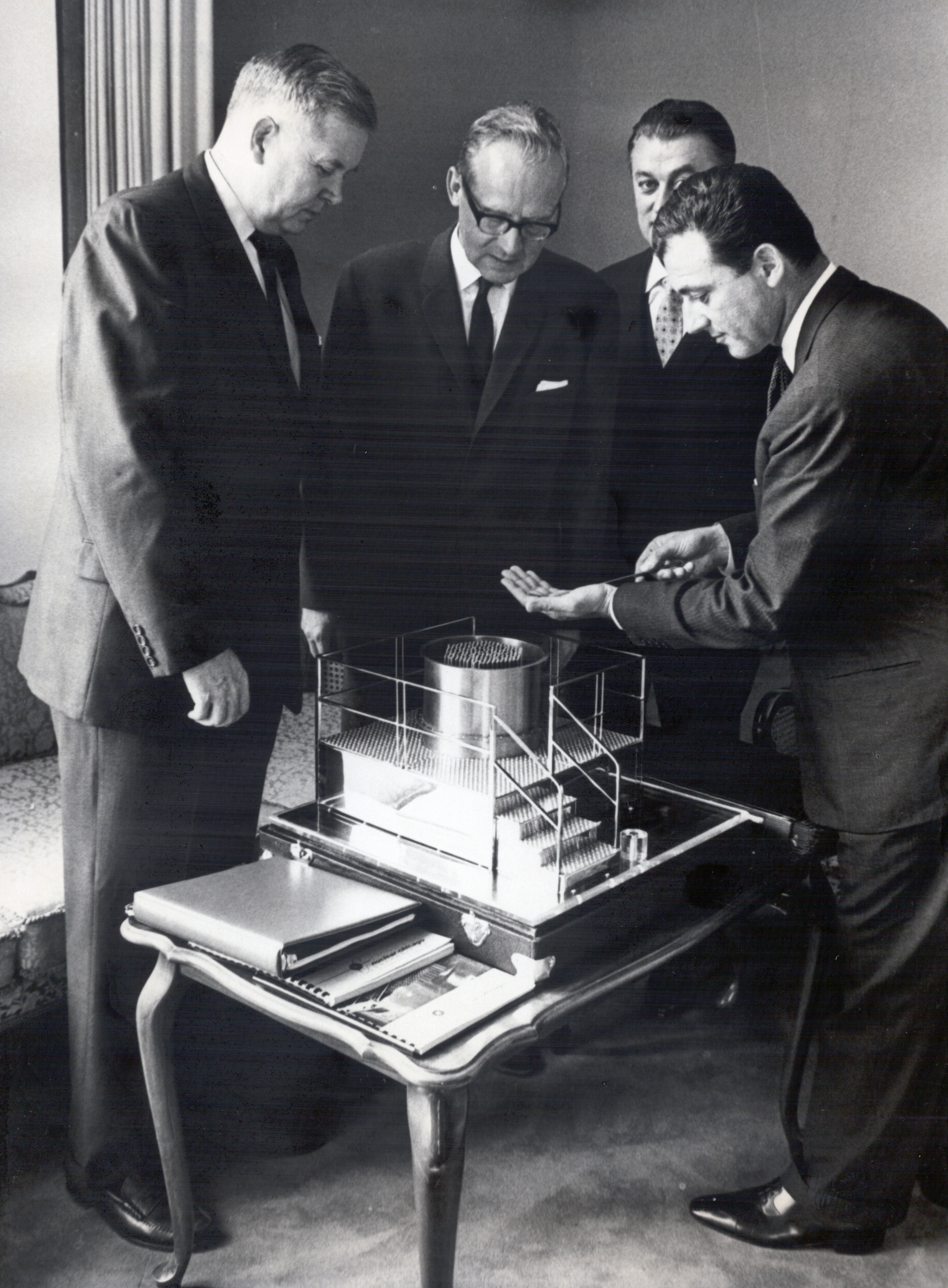
Gerald Tape (left) at the International Atomic Energy Agency in 1964

Gerald F. Tape (1915 – November 20, 2005) was an American physicist.

== Education ==
He received his Ph.D. in nuclear physics in 1939 from the University of Michigan.

== Career ==
From 1939 to 1942 he was instructor of physics at Cornell University. During World War II (1942 - 1945) he worked at MIT Radiation Laboratory (nicknamed the Rad Lab). He was deputy director of the Brookhaven National Laboratory He was Atomic Energy Commission Commissioner : July 15, 1963 - April 30, 1969. He was then U.S. representative to the International Atomic Energy Agency 1973 - 1980. He retired in 1980.

== Awards ==
In 1986 he was elected to the National Academy of Engineering "For distinguished leadership in the national and international development and control of nuclear energy." In 1987 he received the Enrico Fermi Award "For a distinguished career in the administration, development, and advancement of U.S. and international atomic energy, as well as contributions to the nonproliferation of nuclear weapons, with special recognition for his integrity."

== Books ==
- Attitudes : Past and Future - U.S. Atomic Energy Commission, 1966
- What Next for Nuclear Power - U.S. Atomic Energy Commission, 1968
