= Mammalian Genetics Unit =

Genetics research institute in Oxfordshire, England

- Abbreviation: MGU
- Formation: 1995
- Type: Research institute
- Legal status: Government agency
- Purpose: Genetics research in the UK
- Location: Oxfordshire, OX11 0RD
- Coordinates: 51°35′N 1°19′W
- Region served: UK
- Parent organization: Medical Research Council
- Staff: c. 400 genetics scientists
- Website: MGU

The Mammalian Genetics Unit was a genetics and genomics research institute in Oxfordshire.

== History ==
Earlier research on the same site at the Radiobiology Research Unit, which opened in 1954, in the 1950s was into cytogenetics, where Charles Edmund Ford and John Hamerton confirmed on 12 January 1956 the size of the human genome. In the early 1970s this unit led research into mutagenic effects of radiation on the human chromosome. In the mid-1980s, important early work was done in genomic imprinting.

From 2007, the site no longer carried out work into the effects of radiation on genes (radiobiology).

From April 2022, the site closed as the Mammalian Genetics Unit and was merged with the neighboring Mary Lyon Centre.

=== MGU ===
The MGU was largely derived from the earlier Radiobiology Unit (RBU). In 2010, work at the unit discovered that overexpression of the FTO gene led to obesity.

== Structure ==
The unit was in Oxfordshire.

== Function ==
The unit carried out work into genetics and genome engineering.

== See also ==
- List of geneticists
- Environmental Mutagenesis and Genomics Society
