= Vilsmeier–Haack reaction =

Chemical reaction

Named after	Anton Vilsmeier; Albrecht Haack
Reaction type	Substitution reaction

Identifiers
Organic Chemistry Portal	vilsmeier-reaction
RSC ontology ID	RXNO:0000055

The Vilsmeier–Haack reaction (also called the Vilsmeier reaction) is the chemical reaction of a substituted formamide (1) with phosphorus oxychloride and an electron-rich arene (3) to produce an aryl aldehyde or ketone (5):

RC(=O)NR′R″ + HArZ + POCl_{3} + H_{2}O → RC(=O)ArZ + NR′R″H + HCl + H_{3}PO_{4}

The reaction is named after Anton Vilsmeier and Albrecht Haack.

For example, benzanilide and dimethylaniline react with phosphorus oxychloride to produce an unsymmetrical diaryl ketone. Similarly, anthracene is formylated at the 9-position. The reaction of anthracene with N-methylformanilide, also using phosphorus oxychloride, gives 9-anthracenecarboxaldehyde:

N-Methylformanilide and anthracene and phosphorus oxychloride

In general, the electron-rich arene (3) must be much more active than benzene for the reaction to proceed; phenols or anilines are good substrates.

== Reaction mechanism ==
The reaction of a substituted amide with phosphorus oxychloride gives a substituted chloroiminium ion (2), also called the Vilsmeier reagent. The initial product is an iminium ion (4b), which is hydrolyzed to the corresponding ketone or aldehyde during workup.

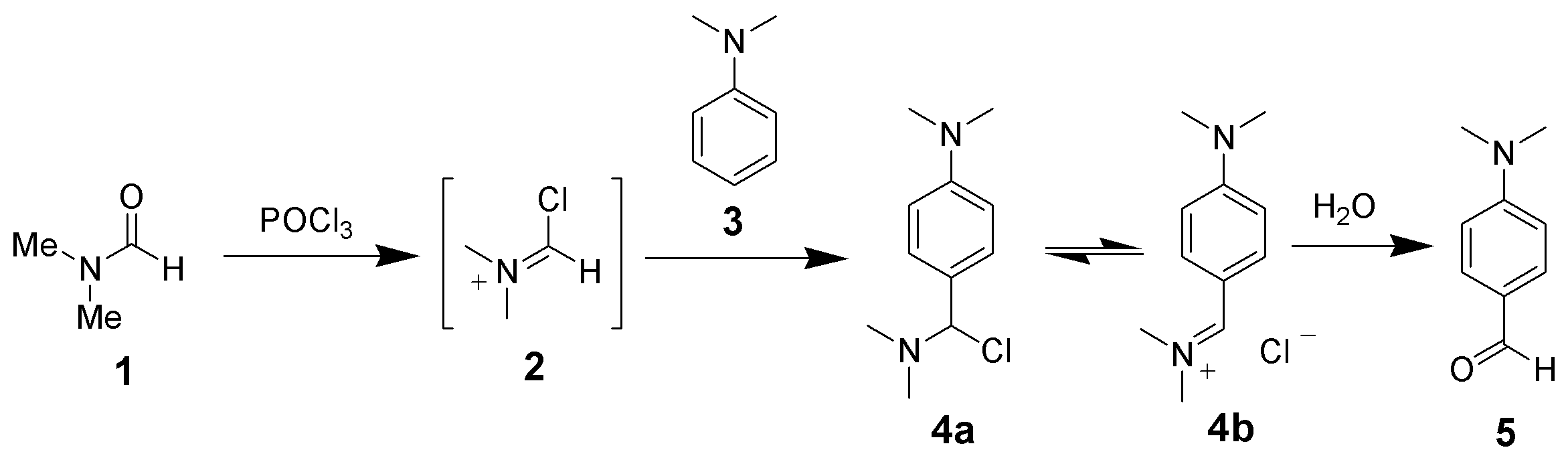
The Vilsmeier–Haack reaction

== See also ==
- Formylation reaction
