= Imidoyl chloride =

Class of chemical compounds

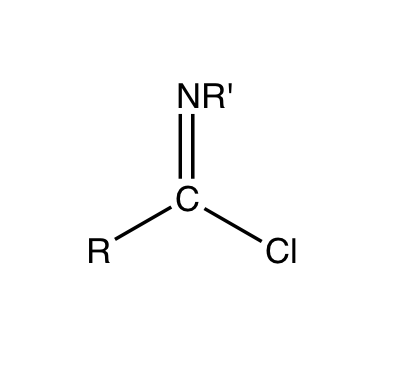
Imidoyl chloride functional group

Imidoyl chlorides are organic compounds that contain the functional group RC(NR')Cl. A double bond exist between the R'N and the carbon centre. These highly reactive compounds resemble acyl chlorides, but also have a substantial relationship with enamine chemistry. They appear as synthetic intermediates in the Gattermann aldehyde synthesis, Houben-Hoesch ketone synthesis, and certain Beckmann rearrangements.

Many chlorinated N-heterocycles are formally imidoyl chlorides, e.g. 2-chloropyridine, 2, 4, and 6-chloropyrimidines.

== Synthesis ==
Imidoyl halides are synthesized by combining amides and halogenating agents. The structure of the carboxylic acid amides plays a role in the outcome of the synthesis. Imidoyl chlorides can be prepared from a monosubstituted carboxamide and thionyl chloride, phosphorus pentachloride, or phosgene:

RC(O)NHR′ + COCl_{2} → RC(NR′)Cl + HCl + CO_{2}

The analogous reaction with a secondary amide produces a Vilsmeier reagent.

The same reagents can also produce imidoyl chlorides from other substrates. Generally the halogen-chalcogen exchange proceeds better for thioamides, but thioamides are more difficult to produce than standard carboxamides. Ketoximes give imidoyl chlorides via a Beckmann rearrangement.

Alternatively, hydrogen halides add to nitriles in a Ritter-type reaction. The iminium salt (see § Reactivity) products of these reactions are stable, but the neutral compounds with an unsubstituted nitrogen atom are rather unstable, frequently self-condensing to the triazine.

== Physical properties ==
Imidoyl chlorides are generally colorless liquids or low-melting solids that are sensitive to both heat and especially moisture. In their IR spectra these compounds exhibit a characteristic ν_{C=N} band near 1650–1689 cm^{−1}. Although both the syn and anti configurations are possible, most imidoyl chlorides adopt the anti configuration.

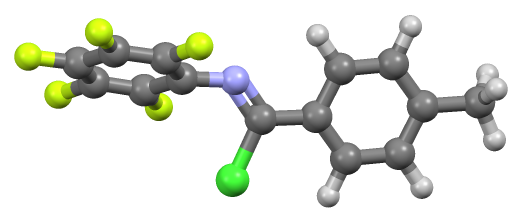
Structure of the imidoyl chloride C_{6}F_{5}N=C(Cl)C_{6}H_{4}-4-Me (color code:yellow = F, green = Cl; violet=N)

== Reactivity ==
Imidoyl chlorides are useful intermediates in the syntheses of several compounds, including imidates, thioimidates, amidines, and imidoyl cyanides. These are produced by reaction with the corresponding nucleophile. For example, with hydrogen sulfide produces thioamides...

RC(NR′)Cl + H_{2}S → RC(S)NHR′ + HCl

...and likewise with amines produces amidines:

RC(NR′)Cl + 2R″NH_{2} → RC(NR′)NHR″ + R″NH_{3}Cl

Imidoyl chlorides react readily with water, which makes any attempt to isolate and store them for long periods of time difficult. Hydrolysis re-forms the corresponding amide:

RC(NR′)Cl + H_{2}O → RCONHR′ + HCl

The above nucleophilic reactions are neither simple S_{N,2} substitutions nor tetrahedral addition-eliminations. Instead, two competing mechanisms appear at work: the S_{N,2} substitution and elimination-addition through a ketenimine intermediate. Arimidoyl chlorides cannot form the ketenimine and hydrolyze "considerably slower" than acyclic primary and secondary aliphatic derivatives. In that case, electron-withdrawing substituents further decrease the reaction rate.

Heated imidoyl chlorides tend to undergo self-condensation if the imidoyl chloride has an α CH group, an effect retarded by bulky or electron-withdrawing substituents on the nitrogen. At higher temperatures, they dehydrohalogenate to nitriles:

RC(NR′)Cl → RC≡N + R′Cl

If R is tertiary, then in some cases the reaction can still occur through dealkylation.

Treatment of imidoyl chloride with hydrogen halides, such as HCl, forms the corresponding iminium chloride cations:

RC(NR′)Cl + HCl → [RC(NHR′)Cl]^{+}Cl^{−}

Imidoyl chlorides can be easily halogenated at the α carbon position.

== Related compounds ==
Other leaving groups instead of chloride, e.g. imidoyl bromides or imidoyl benzotriazoles, react similarly. The latter are less sensitive to hydrolysis.

Imidoyl fluorides are somewhat different.
