= N-Methylformamide =

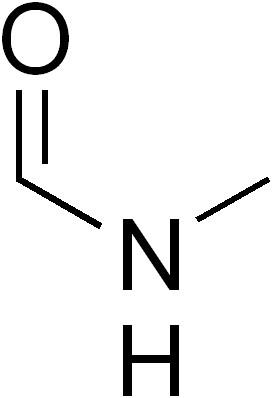
- Skeletal formula of N-methylformamide

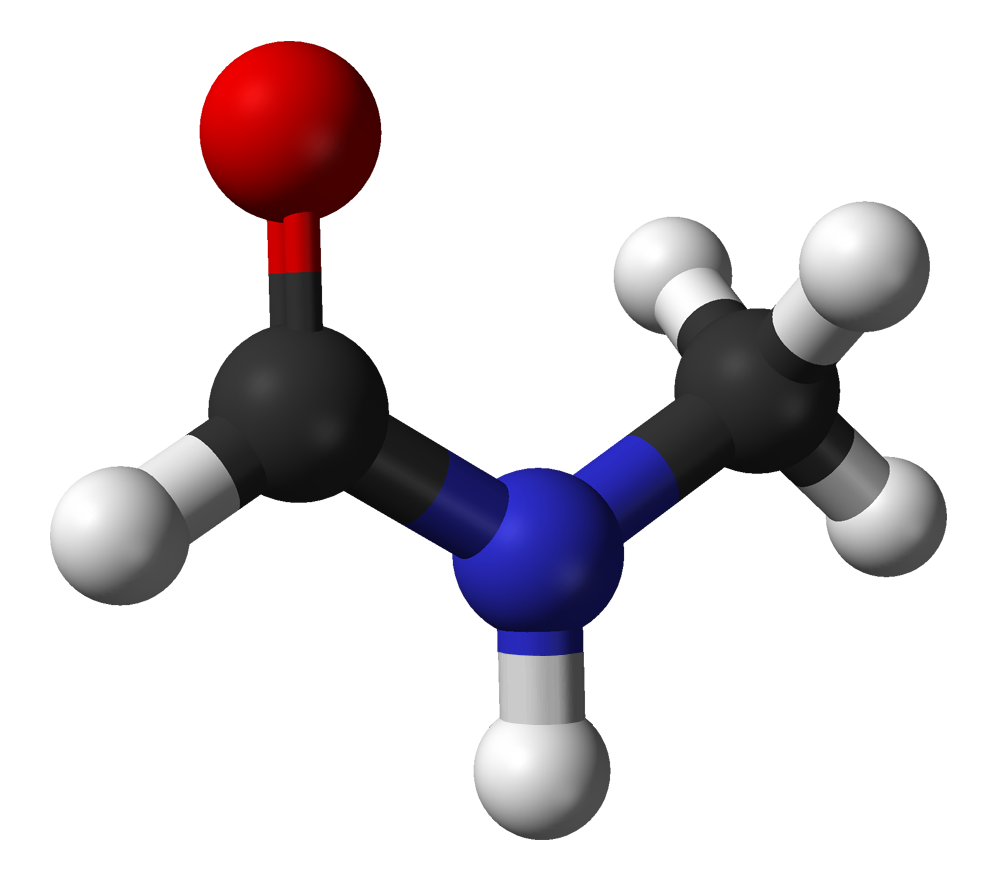
- Ball and stick model of N-methylformamide

Names
- Preferred IUPAC name N-Methylformamide
- Systematic IUPAC name N-Methylmethanamide
- Other names Methylformide; NMF

Identifiers
CAS Number	123-39-7
3D model (JSmol)	Interactive image
Beilstein Reference	1098352
ChEBI	CHEBI:7438
ChEMBL	ChEMBL9240
ChemSpider	28994
ECHA InfoCard	100.004.205
EC Number	204-624-6
KEGG	C11489
MeSH	methylformamide
PubChem CID	31254
RTECS number	LQ3000000
UNII	XPE4G7Y986
CompTox Dashboard (EPA)	DTXSID0025608
- InChI: InChI=1S/C2H5NO/c1-3-2-4/h2H,1H3,(H,3,4) Key: ATHHXGZTWNVVOU-UHFFFAOYSA-N
- SMILES: CNC=O

Properties
Chemical formula	C_{2}H_{5}NO
Molar mass	59.068 g·mol^{−1}
Appearance	Colourless liquid
Odor	fishy, ammoniacal
Density	1.011 g mL^{−1}
Melting point	−4 °C (25 °F; 269 K)
Boiling point	182.6 °C; 360.6 °F; 455.7 K
Solubility in water	Miscible
Refractive index (n_{D})	1.432

Thermochemistry
Heat capacity (C)	125.2 J K^{−1} mol^{−1}

Hazards
- GHS labelling
Pictograms	(GHS07: Exclamation mark) (GHS08: Health hazard)
Signal word	Danger
Hazard statements	H312, H360
Precautionary statements	P280, P308+P313
Flash point	111 °C (232 °F; 384 K)
- Lethal dose or concentration (LD, LC)
LD_{50} (median dose)	4 g kg^{−1} (oral, rat)

Related compounds
Related alkanamides	Dimethylformamide; dimethylacetamide; formamide
- Except where otherwise noted, data are given for materials in their standard state (at 25 °C [77 °F], 100 kPa). verify (what is ?) Infobox references

N-Methylformamide (NMF) is a colorless, nearly odorless, organic compound and secondary amide with molecular formula CH_{3}NHCHO, which is a liquid at room temperature. NMF is mainly used as a reagent in various organic syntheses with limited applications as a highly polar solvent.

NMF is closely related to other formamides, notably formamide and dimethylformamide (DMF). However, industrial use and production of NMF are far less than for either of these other formamides. DMF is favored over NMF as a solvent due to its greater stability. Annual production of NMF can be assumed to be significantly less than the production of either formamide (100,000 tons) or DMF (500,000 tons).

== Structure and properties ==
Because of slow rotation about the N-C(O) bond, NMF exists as two rotamers that can be distinguished by NMR spectroscopy. The two principal resonance structures for one of these rotamers is shown:

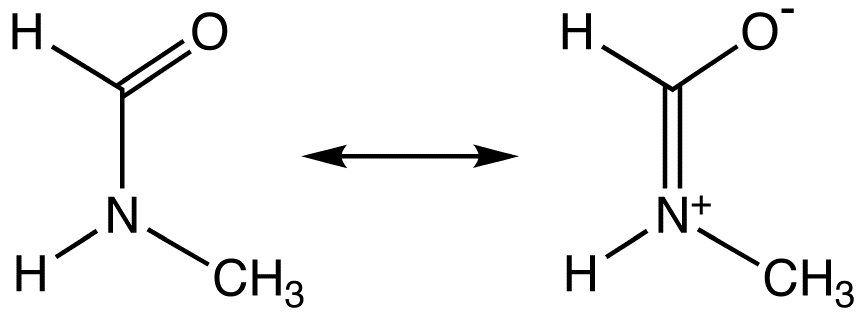

This description highlights the partial double bond that exists between the carbonyl carbon and nitrogen, which raises the rotational barrier. Thus, the molecule is not able to freely rotate around its main axis and the (E)-configuration is preferred due to steric repulsion of the larger substituents.

This molecule has been tentatively identified in interstellar space by the ALMA radio telescope. It may have formed on dust grains. This could prove to be a key molecule for interstellar pre-biotic chemistry due to its peptide bond.

== Preparation ==
NMF is typically prepared by allowing methylamine to react with methyl formate:

CH_{3}NH_{2} + HCOOCH_{3} → HCONHCH_{3} + CH_{3}OH

A less common alternative to this process is transamidation involving formamide:

HCONH_{2} + CH_{3}NH_{2} → HCONHCH_{3} + NH_{3}

== Uses ==
NMF is a specialized solvent in oil refineries. It is a precursor in specialized amidation reactions where formamide would not be suitable. These reactions can generally be categorized by the following equation:

R−Lg + CH_{3}NHCHO → R−NCH_{3}CHO + H−Lg (Where Lg is a leaving group).

Formothion is an insecticide prepared from N-methylformamide.

=== Laboratory uses ===
NMF is the precursor to methyl isocyanide, a ligand in coordination chemistry. NMF is used as a solvent in aluminum electrolytic capacitors.
