= Nickel organic acid salts =

The nickel organic acid salts are organic acid salts of nickel. In many of these the ionised organic acid acts as a ligand.

Nickel acetate has the formula (CH_{3}COO)_{2}Ni·4H_{2}O. It has monodentate acetate and hydrogen bonding. A dihydrate also exists. Nickel acetate is used to seal anodised aluminium.

Nickel formate Ni(HCOO)_{2.2}H_{2}O decomposes when heated to yield carbon dioxide, carbon monoxide, hydrogen, water and finely divided porous nickel. All the nickel atoms are six coordinated, but half have four water molecules and two formate oxygens close to the atom, and the other half are coordinated by six oxygens of formate groups.

Nickel oxalate dihydrate dehydrates at 258 °C and decomposes to Ni metal at 316 °C. Nickel oxalate can be formed into various nanorods and nanofibres by use of surfactants. Aspergillus niger is able to dispose of otherwise toxic levels of nickel in its environment by forming nickel oxalate dihydrate crystals. Double oxalate salts where oxalate is a ligand on the nickel atom may be called oxalatonickelates.

Other organic acid salts of nickel include nickel oleate, nickel propionate, nickel butyrate, nickel caprylate, nickel lactate, nickel benzoate, nickel bis(acetyl acetonate), nickel salicylate, nickel alkyl phenyl salicylate. Nickel stearate forms a green solution, however when precipitated with alcohol a gel is produced, that also contains a mixture of basic salts, and free stearic acid.

Nickel malonate, and nickel hydrogen malonate both crystallise with two molecules of water. They decompose when heated to yield gaseous water, carbon dioxide, carbon monoxide, ethanol, acetic acid, methyl formate and ethyl formate. Nickel acetate exists as an intermediate and the final result is that solid nickel, nickel oxide, Ni_{3}C and carbon remain. With malonate nickel can form a bis-malonato-nickelate anion, which can form double salts. Nickel maleate can be made from maleic acid and nickel carbonate in boiling water. A dihydrate crystallises from the water solution.

Nickel fumarate prepared from fumaric acid and nickel carbonate is pale green as a tetrahydrate, and mustard coloured as an anhydride. It decomposes when heated to 300 °C to 340 °C in vacuum. Decomposition mostly produces nickel carbide, carbon dioxide, carbon monoxide and methane. But also produced were butanes, benzene, toluene, and organic acid.

Nickel succinate can form metal organic framework compounds.

Nickel citrate complexes are found in leaves of some nickel accumulating plant species in New Caledonia such as Pycnandra acuminata. Citrate complexes include NiHcit, NiHcit_{2}^{3−}, Nicit^{−}, Nicit_{2}^{4−}, and Ni_{2}H_{2}cit_{2}^{4−} (ordered from low to high pH). Also, there is Ni_{4}H_{4}cit_{3}^{5−}. Nickel citrate is important in nickel plating. When precipitation of nickel citrate is attempted, a gel forms. This consists of tangled fibres of [(C_{6}H_{6}O_{7})Ni]_{n}, which can be reduced to nickel metal fibres less than a micron thick, and meters long. Double nickel citrates exist, including tetraanion citrate when pH is over 9.5. An amorphous nickel iron citrate Ni_{3}Fe_{6}O_{4}(C_{6}H_{6}O_{7})_{8}·6H_{2}O produces carbon monoxide, carbon dioxide and acetone when heated over 200 °C leaving NiFe_{2}O_{4}, a nickel ferrite with the same formula as trevorite. A green crystalline nickel citrate with formula Ni_{3}(C_{6}H_{5}O_{7})_{2}·10H_{2}O melts at 529K and decomposition starts at 333K.

Nickel glutarate in the form called Mil-77, [Ni_{20}{(C_{5}H_{6}O_{4})_{20}(H_{2}O)_{8}}]⋅40H_{2}O is pale green. It crystallises in a porous structure containing twenty member rings. The 40 water molecules "occluded" in the porous channels come out when it is heated to 150 °C retaining the crystal framework. At 240 °C the crystal form changes and over 255° the remaining water is lost. Between 330° and 360° the organic components burn and it is destroyed.

Cyclopropane carboxylic acid forms two basic salts with nickel, a hydrate Ni_{9}(OH)_{2}(H_{2}O)_{6}(C_{4}H_{5}O_{2})_{8} • 2H_{2}O with density 1.554 mg/m^{3} and an anhydrous form Ni_{5}(OH)_{2}(C_{4}H_{5}O_{2})_{8} with density 2.172 mg/m^{3}.

Nickel trifluoroacetate tetrahydrate exists, as well as two emerald green acid trifluoroacetates, a bridged trinuclear form [Ni_{3}(CF_{3}COO)_{6}(CF_{3}COOH)_{6}](CF_{3}COOH) and a hydrated acid form [Ni_{3}(CF_{3}COO)_{6}(CF_{3}COOH)_{2}(H_{2}O)_{4}](CF_{3}COOH)_{2} both with triclinic crystal form. The first has density 2.205 and the second 2.124. They are made by dissolving the nickel trifluoroacetate tetrahydrate in trifluoroacetic acid either anhydrous or 1% hydrated.

Nickel naphthenate is used as a fuel additive to suppress smoke, as a rubber catalyst and as an oil additive.

When Nickel benzoate is heated in a vacuum, carbon dioxide, carbon monoxide, benzene, benzoic acid, phenol, biphenyl, nickel, nickel oxide, and nickel carbide are formed. It can crystallise as anhydrous, a trihydrate or a tetrahydrate.

Nickel terephthalate can be precipitated by a double decomposition of sodium terephthalate and nickel nitrate. Its solubility is 0.38 g/100g water at 25 °C. In ammonium hydroxide a violet solution forms. Boiling acetic acid converts the nickel to nickel acetate. The terephthalate converts to a basic salt when boiled in water. Understating this compound is important when reducing coloured contaminants in polymers made from terephthalate.

== Listing ==
formula	name	mol	struct	cell Å			°	V	Z	density	colour	refs
		wt		a	b	c	β	Å^{3}		g/cm^{3}		
Ni(HCOO)_{2}·2H_{2}O	Nickel formate hydrate		monoclinic	8.60	7.06	9.21	96°50′	4				
[Ni_{20}{(C_{5}H_{6}O_{4})_{20}(H_{2}O)_{8}}] · 40 H_{2}O	Nickel glutarate		cubic	16.581				4559			pale green	
Ni_{9}(OH)_{2}(H_{2}O)_{6}(C_{4}H_{5}O_{2})_{8}·2H_{2}O	nickel cyclopropane carboxylate hydrate		orthorhombic	14.810	24.246	24.607		8836	4	1.554	bright green	
Ni_{5}(OH)_{2}(C_{4}H_{5}O_{2})_{8}	nickel cyclopropane carboxylate		orthorhombic	19.406	18.466	21.579	90	7733	8	2.172	pale green	
[Ni_{3}(CF_{3}COO)_{6}(CF_{3}COOH)_{6}](CF_{3}COOH)	Nickel acid trifluoroacetate		trigonal	13.307		53.13		8148	6	2.205	emerald green	
[Ni_{3}(CF_{3}COO)_{6}(CF_{3}COOH)_{2}(H_{2}O)_{4}](CF_{3}COOH)_{2}	Nickel acid trifluoroacetate hydrate		triclinic	9.12	10.379	12.109	α=84.59° β=72.20° γ=82.80°	1080.9	1	2.124	emerald green	
K_{2}[Ni(C_{6}H_{5}O_{7})(H_{2}O)_{2}]_{2}·4H_{2}O	potassium nickel citrate		triclinic	6.729	9.100	10.594	α=94.86 β=100.76 γ=103.70	613.5	1	1.942	green	
K_{2}[Ni_{2}(C_{6}H_{5}O_{7})_{2}(H_{2}O)_{4}]·4H_{2}O	Dipotassium tetraaquabis(μ-citrato-k^{4}O:O',O'',O''')nickelate(II) tetrahydrate	717.94	monoclinic	10.616	13.006	9.0513	93.09	1247.8	2	1.911	green	
N(CH_{3})_{4}[Ni_{4}(C_{6}H_{4}O_{7})_{3}(OH)(H_{2}O)]·18H_{2}O	tetramethyl ammonium nickel basic citrate		triclinic	11.84	14.29	20.93	96.16 β=106.36 γ=94.89	3352	1		bright green extremely weak	
Na_{2}[Ni(C_{6}H_{4}O_{7})] · 2 H_{2}O	disodium nickel citrate										green dec 371	
(NH_{4})_{2}[Ni(HCit) · 2 H_{2}O]_{2} · 2 H_{2}O	Dimeric ammonium diaquocitratonickelate (II) dihydrate	639.79	triclinic	6.407	9.471	9.6904	α=105.064 β=91.99 γ=89.33	567.5	1	1.872	green	
(NH_{4})_{4}[Ni(HCit)_{2}] · 2 H_{2}O	tetrammonium dicitratonickelate (11) dihydrate	545.10	monoclinic	9.361	13.496	9.424	115.476	1074.9	2	1.684		
Na_{2}[Ni(HCit) · 2 H_{2}O]_{2} · 2 H_{2}O	Dimeric sodium diaquocitratonickelate (II) dihydrate											
K_{2}[Ni(HCit) · 2 H_{2}O]_{2} · 2 H_{2}O	Dimeric potassium diaquocitratonickelate (II) dihydrate											
(NH_{4})_{2}[Ni(H_{2}O)_{6}][Ti(H_{2}cit)_{3}]_{2}·6H_{2}O		1547.43	hexagonal	15.562		7.690		1605.5	1	1.600	light green	
[Ni(C_{5}H_{7}O_{2})_{2}]_{3}	Nickel(II) acetylacetonate	256.91	orthorhombic	23.23	9.64	15.65		3505	4	1.46	dark green	
Ni[C_{4}O_{4}] · 2 H_{2}O	nickel squarate		?cubic	8.068	8.068	8.068	90°	525		1.93	green	
Ni[C_{4}O_{4}] · 8 H_{2}O	nickel squarate octahydrate	428.93	monoclinic	10.288	6.372	12.852	106.98	805.8	2	1.768	green	
Ni[C_{5}O_{5}] · 3 H_{2}O	Nickel croconate trihydrate		orthorhombic								green	
K_{2}[Ni(C_{5}O_{5})_{2}(H_{2}O)_{2}] · 4 H_{2}O	di-μ_{2}-aqua-di-μ_{5}-croconato(2-)-nickel(II)dipotassium(I) tetrahydrate	525.11	monoclinic	8.015	6.660	16.489	90.20	880.1	2	1.982	green	
Ni(C_{5}H_{5}COO)_{2} · 2 H_{2}O	nickel dibenzoate tetrahydrate	354.98	monoclinic	6.1341	34.180	6.9793	95.331	1457.0	4	1.618	light green	
Ni(C_{5}H_{5}COOCOOH)_{2} · 6 H_{2}O	nickel dihydrogen diphthalate hexahydrate		monoclinic	16.024	5.574	12.500	113.42		2	1.611		
Ni[C_{6}H_{4}(COO)_{2}] · 4 H_{2}O	Nickel terephthalate										green	
Ni(OH)[C_{6}H_{4}(COO)(COOH)] · H_{2}O	basic nickel terephthalate										green	
