= Formylation =

Chemical reaction

Formyl functional group is shown in blue.

Formylation refers to any chemical processes in which a compound is functionalized with a formyl group (-CH=O). In organic chemistry, the term is most commonly used with regard to aromatic compounds (for example, the conversion of benzene to benzaldehyde in the Gattermann–Koch reaction). In biochemistry, the reaction is catalysed by enzymes such as formyltransferases.

Formylation generally involves the use of formylation agents, reagents that give rise to the CHO group. Among the many formylation reagents, particularly important are formic acid and carbon monoxide. A formylation reaction in organic chemistry refers to organic reactions in which an organic compound is functionalized with a formyl group (-CH=O). The reaction is a route to aldehydes (C-CH=O), formamides (N-CH=O), and formate esters (O-CH=O).

== Formylation agents ==
A reagent that delivers the formyl group is called a formylating agent. These include:

- Formic acid
- Dimethylformamide and phosphorus oxychloride, in the Vilsmeier-Haack reaction.
- Hexamethylenetetramine, in the Duff reaction and the Sommelet reaction
- Carbon monoxide and hydrochloric acid, in the Gattermann-Koch reaction
- Cyanides, in the Gattermann reaction. This method synthesizes aromatic aldehydes using hydrogen chloride and hydrogen cyanide (or another metallic cyanide as such zinc cyanide) in the presence of Lewis acid catalysts:
- Chloroform, in the Reimer-Tiemann reaction
- Dichloromethyl methyl ether, in Rieche formylation

A particularly important formylation process is hydroformylation, which converts alkenes to the homologated aldehyde.

== Aromatic formylation ==

Formylation reactions are a form of electrophilic aromatic substitution and therefore work best with electron-rich starting materials. Phenols are a common substrate, as they readily deprotonate to excellent phenoxide nucleophiles. Other electron-rich substrates, such as mesitylene, pyrrole, or fused aromatic rings can also be expected to react. Benzene will react under aggressive conditions, but deactivated rings such as pyridine are difficult to formylate effectively.

Many formylation reactions will select only the ortho product (e.g. salicylaldehyde), attributed to attraction between the phenoxide and the formylating reagent. Ionic interactions have been invoked for the cationic nitrogen centres in the Vilsmeier–Haack reaction and Duff reaction, and the electron-deficient carbene in the Reimer-Tiemann reaction; coordination to high oxidation metals has been invoked in the Casiraghi and Rieche formylations (cf. Kolbe–Schmitt reaction).

The direct reaction between phenol and paraformaldehyde is possible via the Casiraghi formylation, but other methods apply masked forms of formaldehyde, in part to limit the formation of phenol formaldehyde resins. Aldehydes are strongly deactivating and as such phenols typically only react once. However certain reactions, such as the Duff reaction, can give double addition.

Formylation can be applied to other aromatic rings. As it generally begins with nucleophilic attack by the aromatic group, the electron density of the ring is an important factor. Some aromatic compounds, such as pyrrole, are known to formylate regioselectively.

Formylation of benzene rings can be achieved via the Gattermann reaction and Gattermann-Koch reaction. These involve strong acid catalysis and proceed in a manner similar to the Friedel–Crafts reaction.

== Aliphatic formylation ==
Hydroformylation of alkenes is the most important method for obtaining aliphatic formyls (i.e., aldehydes). The reaction is largely restricted to industrial settings. Several specialty methods exist for laboratory-scale synthesis, including the Sommelet reaction, Bouveault aldehyde synthesis or Bodroux–Chichibabin aldehyde synthesis.

== Formylation reactions in biology ==
In biochemistry, the addition of a formyl functional group is termed "formylation". A formyl functional group consists of a carbonyl bonded to hydrogen. When attached to an R group, a formyl group is called an aldehyde.

Formylation has been identified in several critical biological processes. Methionine was first discovered to be formylated in E. coli by Marcker and Sanger in 1964 and was later identified to be involved in the initiation of protein synthesis in bacteria and organelles. The formation of N-formylmethionine is catalyzed by the enzyme methionyl-tRNA^{Met} transformylase. Additionally, two formylation reactions occur in the de novo biosynthesis of purines. These reactions are catalyzed by the enzymes glycinamide ribonucleotide (GAR) transformylase and 5-aminoimidazole-4-carboxyamide ribotide (AICAR) transformylase. More recently, formylation has been discovered to be a histone modification, which may modulate gene expression.

=== Methanogenesis ===
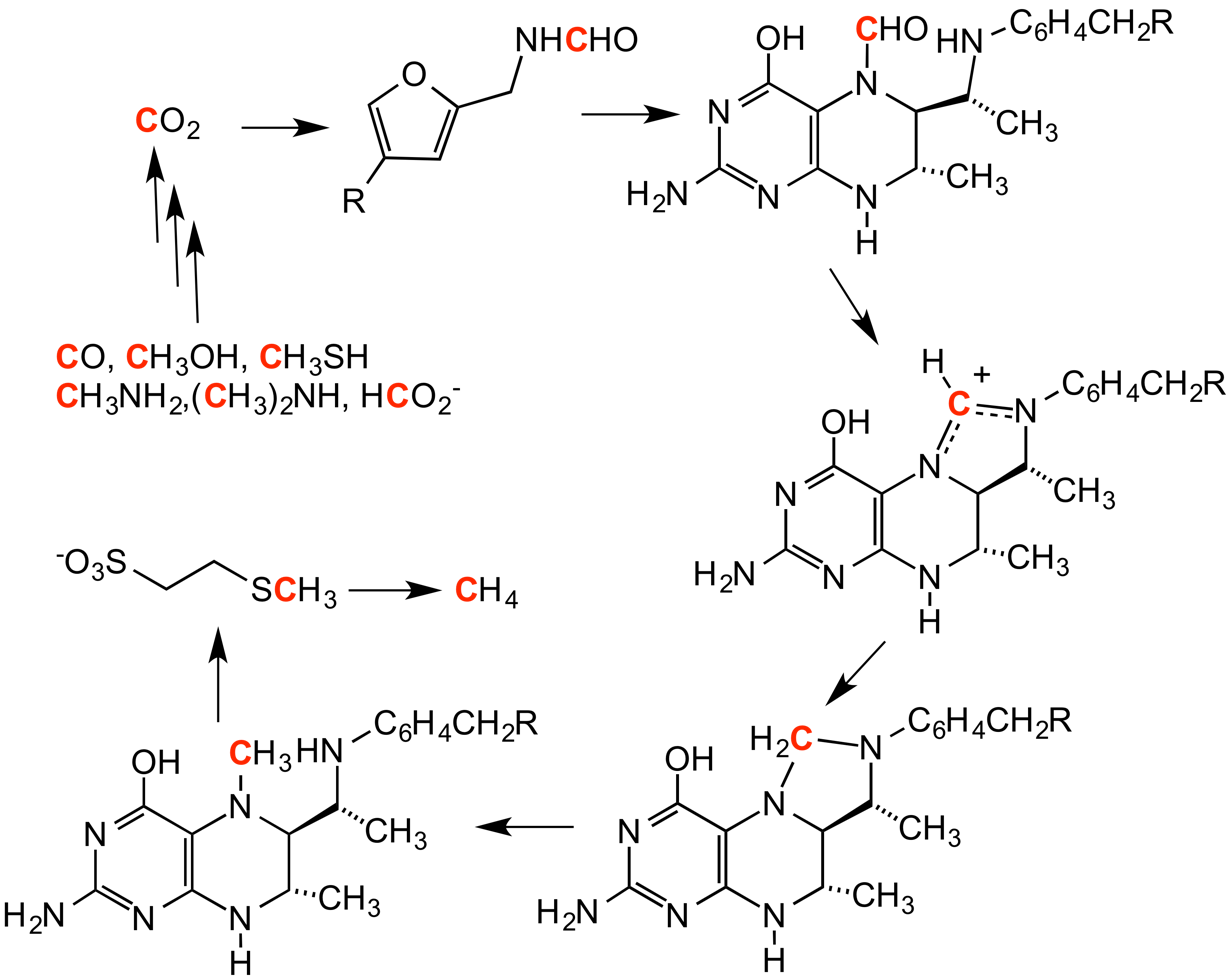
Cycle for methanogenesis, showing initial formylation of methanofuran

Formylation of methanofuran initiates the methanogenesis cycle. The formyl group is derived from carbon dioxide and is converted to methane.

=== Formylation in protein synthesis ===
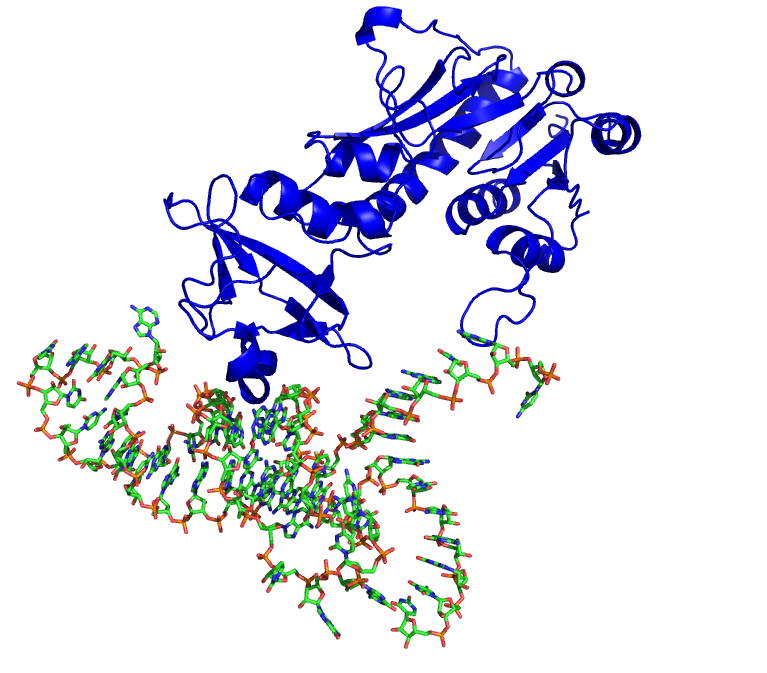
Methionyl tRNAfMet transformylase complexed with initiator formylmethionyl tRNA^{fMet}. Rendered from PDB 2FMT.

In bacteria and organelles, the initiation of protein synthesis is signaled by the formation of formyl-methionyl-tRNA (tRNA^{fMet}). This reaction is dependent on 10-formyltetrahydrofolate, and the enzyme methionyl-tRNA formyltransferase. This reaction is not used by eukaryotes or Archaea, as the presence of tRNA^{fMet} in non bacterial cells is dubbed as intrusive material and quickly eliminated. After its production, tRNA^{fMet} is delivered to the 30S subunit of the ribosome in order to start protein synthesis. fMet possesses the same codon sequence as methionine. However, fMet is only used for the initiation of protein synthesis and is thus found only at the N terminus of the protein. Methionine is used during the rest translation. In E. coli, tRNA^{fMet} is specifically recognized by initiation factor IF-2, as the formyl group blocks peptide bond formation at the N-terminus of methionine.

Once protein synthesis is accomplished, the formyl group on methionine can be removed by peptide deformylase. The methionine residue can be further removed by the enzyme methionine aminopeptidase.

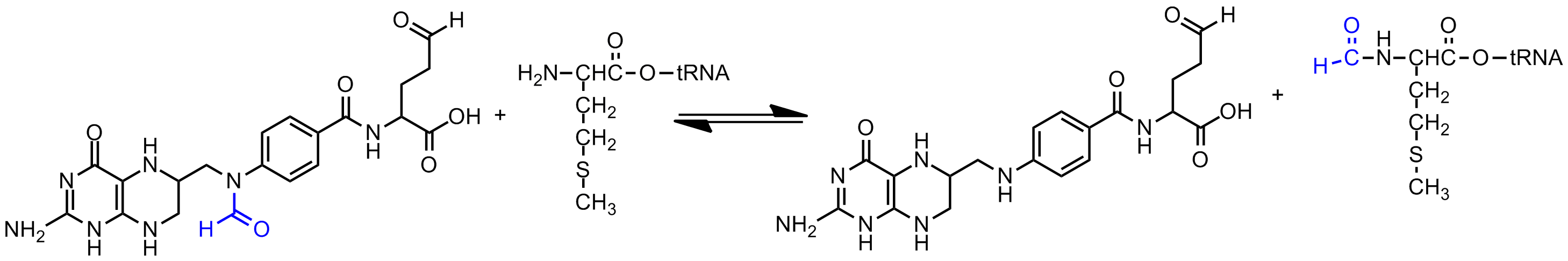
The chemical synthesis of N-formylmethionine is catalyzed by the enzyme methionyl-tRNA formyltransferase.

=== Formylation reactions in purine biosynthesis ===
Two formylation reactions are required in the eleven step de novo synthesis of inosine monophosphate (IMP), the precursor of the purine ribonucleotides AMP and GMP. Glycinamide ribonucleotide (GAR) transformylase catalyzes the formylation of GAR to formylglycinamidine ribotide (FGAR) in the fourth reaction of the pathway. In the penultimate step of de novo purine biosynthesis, 5-aminoimidazole-4-carboxyamide ribotide (AICAR) is formylated to 5-formaminoimidazole-4-carboxamide ribotide (FAICAR) by AICAR transformylase.

==== GAR transformylase ====
PurN GAR transformylase is found in eukaryotes and prokaryotes. However, a second GAR transformylase, PurT GAR transformylase has been identified in E. coli. While the two enzymes have no sequence conservation and require different formyl donors, the specific activity and Km for GAR are the same in both PurT and PurN GAR transformylase.

===== PurN GAR transformylase =====
PurN GAR transformylase 1CDE uses the coenzyme N10-formyltetrahydrofolate (N10-formyl-THF) as a formyl donor to formylate the α-amino group of GAR. In eukaryotes, PurN GAR transformylase is part of a large multifunctional protein, but is found as a single protein in prokaryotes.

===== Mechanism =====
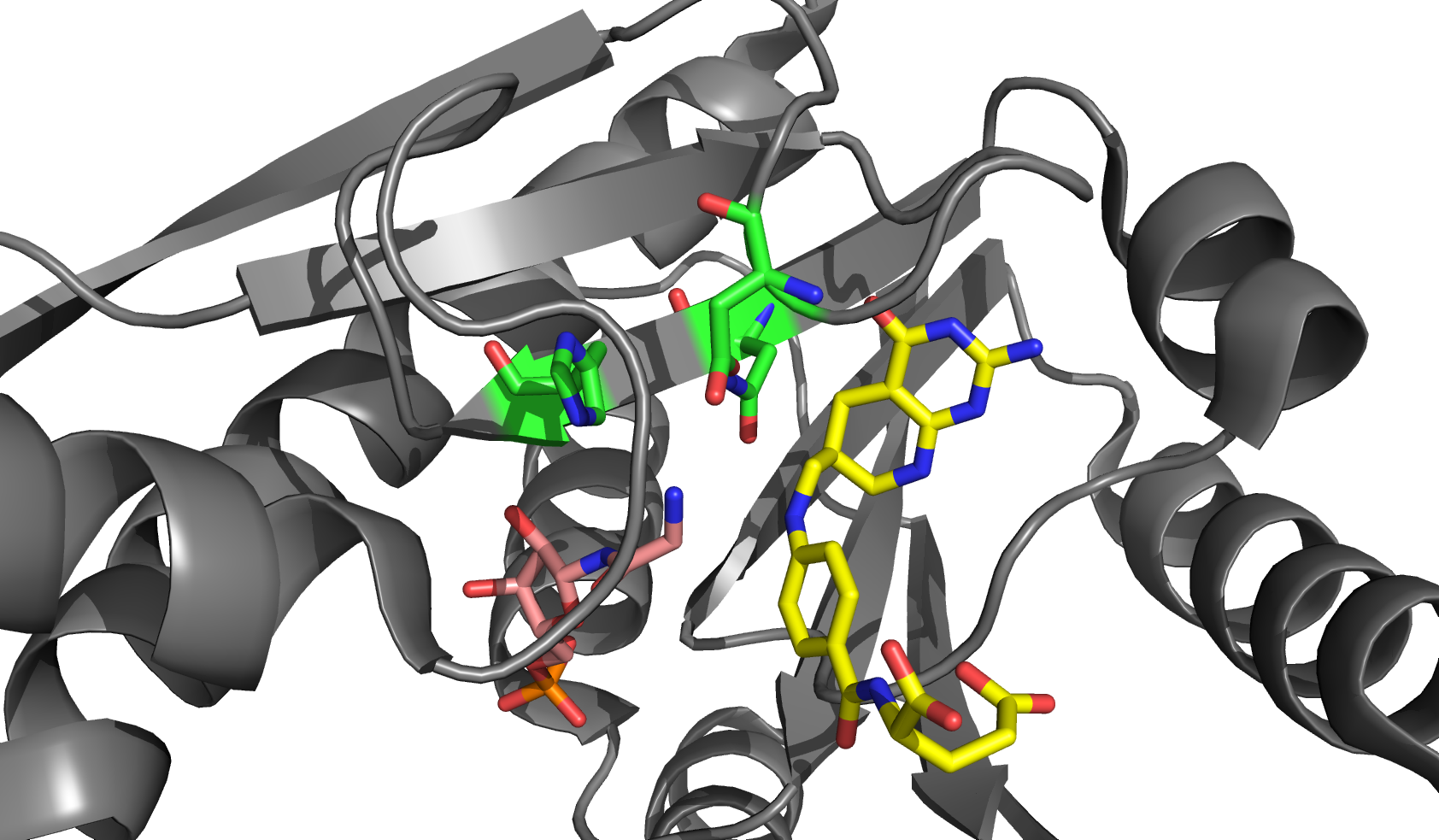
Active site of PurN GAR transformylased in a complex with the folate based inhibitor 5-deaza-5,6,7,8-tetrahydrofolate (5dTHF). The α-amino group of GAR (Pink) is located in a position which would attack a N10-formate group on the folate based inhibitor (yellow). Asn 106, His 108, and Asp 144 are colored green. Rendered from PDB 1CDE.

The formylation reaction is proposed to occur through a direct transfer reaction in which the amine group of GAR nucleophilically attacks N10-formyl-THF creating a tetrahedral intermediate. As the α-amino group of GAR is relatively reactive, deprotonation of the nucleophile is proposed to occur by solvent. In the active site, Asn 106, His 108, and Asp 144 are positioned to assist with formyl transfer. However, mutagenesis studies have indicated that these residues are not individually essential for catalysis, as only mutations of two or more residues inhibit the enzyme. Based on the structure the negatively charged Asp144 is believed to increase the pKa of His108, allowing the protonated imidazolium group of His108 to enhances the electrophilicity of the N10-formyl-THF formyl group. Additionally, His108 and Asn106 are believed to stabilize the oxyanion formed in the transition state.

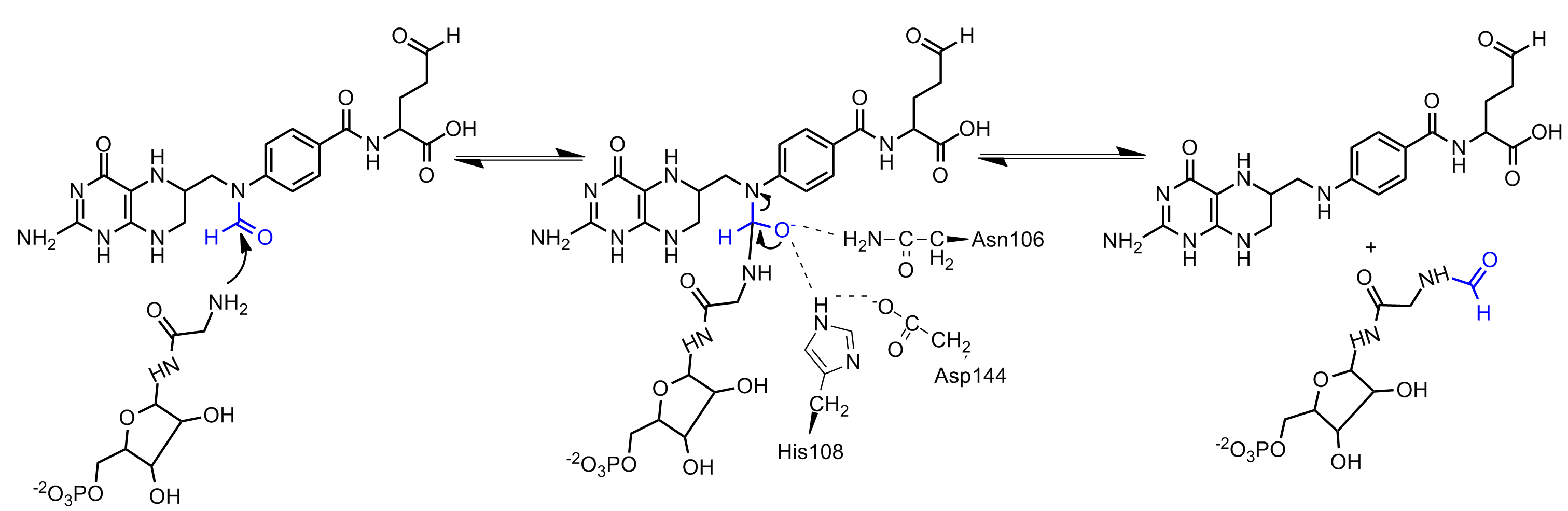
Mechanism of PurN GAR transformylase

===== PurT GAR transformylase =====
PurT GAR transformylase requires formate as the formyl donor and ATP for catalysis. It has been estimated that PurT GAR transformylase carries out 14-50% of GAR formylations in E. coli. The enzyme is a member of the ATP-grasp superfamily of proteins.

===== Mechanism =====
A sequential mechanism has been proposed for PurT GAR transformylase in which a short lived formyl phosphate intermediate is proposed to first form. This formyl phosphate intermediate then undergoes nucleophilic attack by the GAR amine for transfer of the formyl group. A formyl phosphate intermediate has been detected in mutagenesis experiments, in which the mutant PurT GAR transformylase had a weak affinity for formate. Incubating PurT GAR transformylase with formyl phosphate, ADP, and GAR, yields both ATP and FGAR. This further indicating that formyl phosphate may be an intermediate, as it is kinetically and chemically competent to carry out the formylation reaction in the enzyme. An enzyme phosphate intermediate preceding the formylphosphate intermediate has also been proposed to form based on positional isotope exchange studies. However, structural data indicates that the formate may be positioned for a direct attack on the γ-phosphate of ATP in the enzyme's active site to form the formylphosphate intermediate.

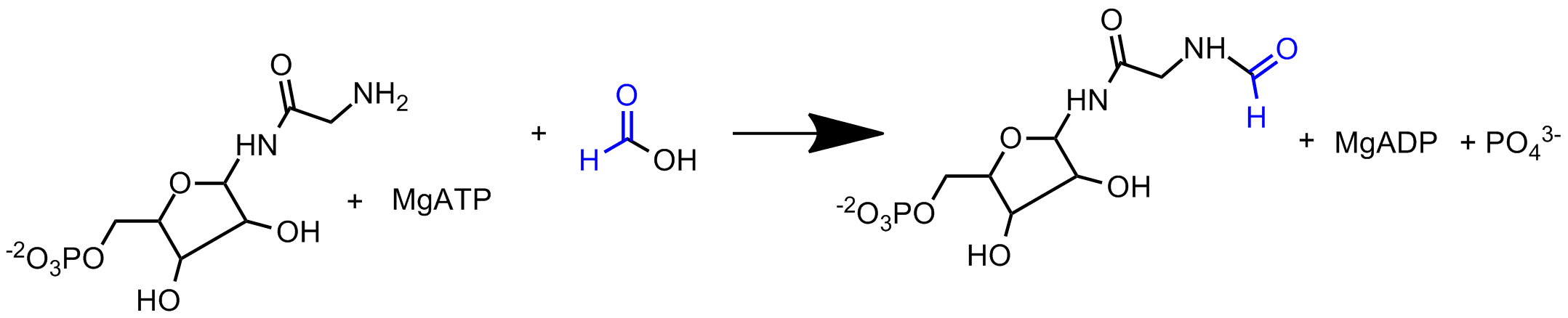
Reaction catalyzed by PurT GAR transformylase

==== AICAR transformylase ====
AICAR transformylase requires the coenzyme N10-formyltetrahydrofolate (N10-formyl-THF) as the formyl donor for the formylation of AICAR to FAICAR. However, AICAR transformylase and GAR transformylase do not share a high sequence similarity or structural homology.

===== Mechanism =====
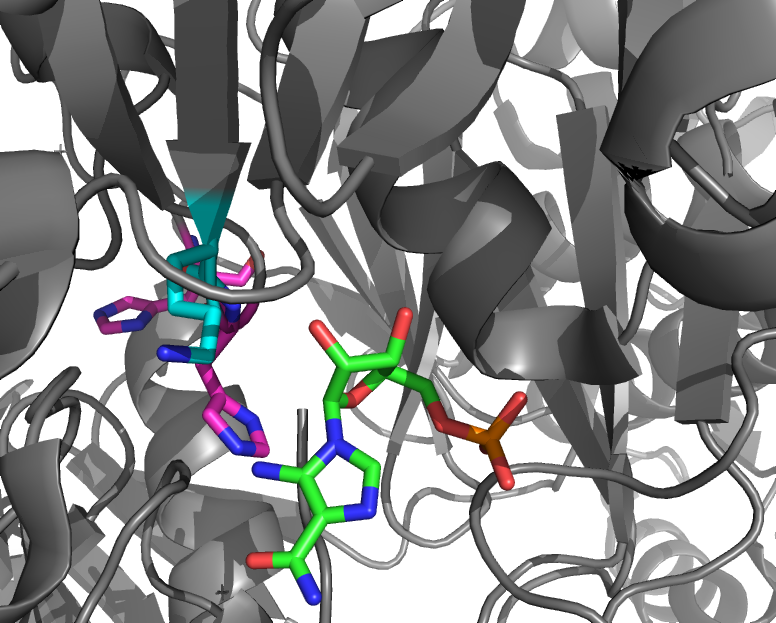
1M9N Active site of AICAR transformylase. Lys267 (cyan), His268 (purple), AICAR (green). Rendered from PDB 1M9N.

The amine on AICAR is much less nucleophillic than its counterpart on GAR due to delocalization of electrons in AICAR through conjugation. Therefore, the N5 nucleophile of AIRCAR must be activated for the formylation reaction to occur. Histidine 268 and Lysine 267 have been found to be essential for catalysis and are conserved in all AICAR transformylase. Histidine 268 is involved in deprotonation of the N5 nucleophile of AICAR, whereas Lysine 267 is proposed to stabilize the tetrahedral intermediate.

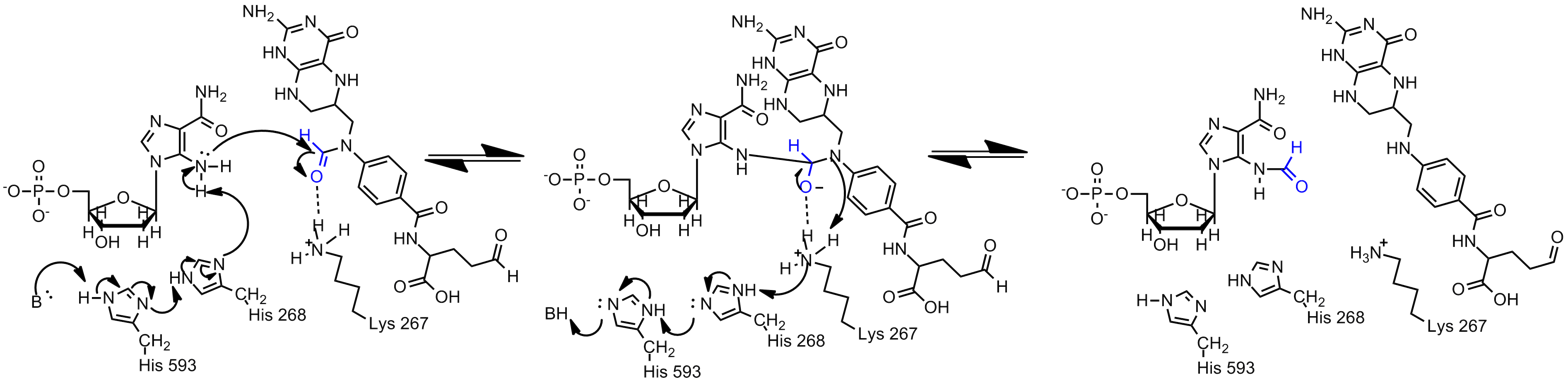
Mechanism catalyzed by AICAR transformylase

=== Formylation in histone proteins ===
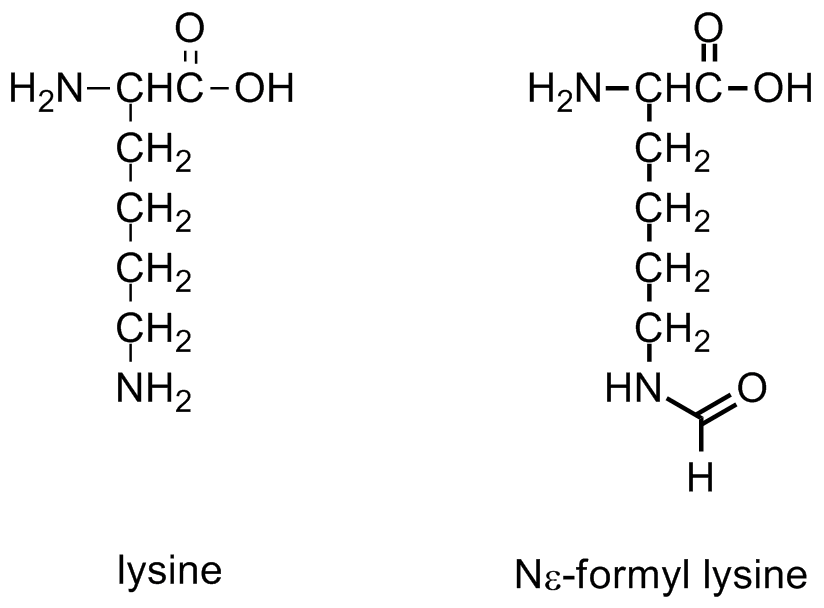
Formylation is a post-translational modification which occurs on lysine residues.

ε-Formylation is one of many post-translational modifications that occur on histone proteins, which been shown to modulate chromatin conformations and gene activation.

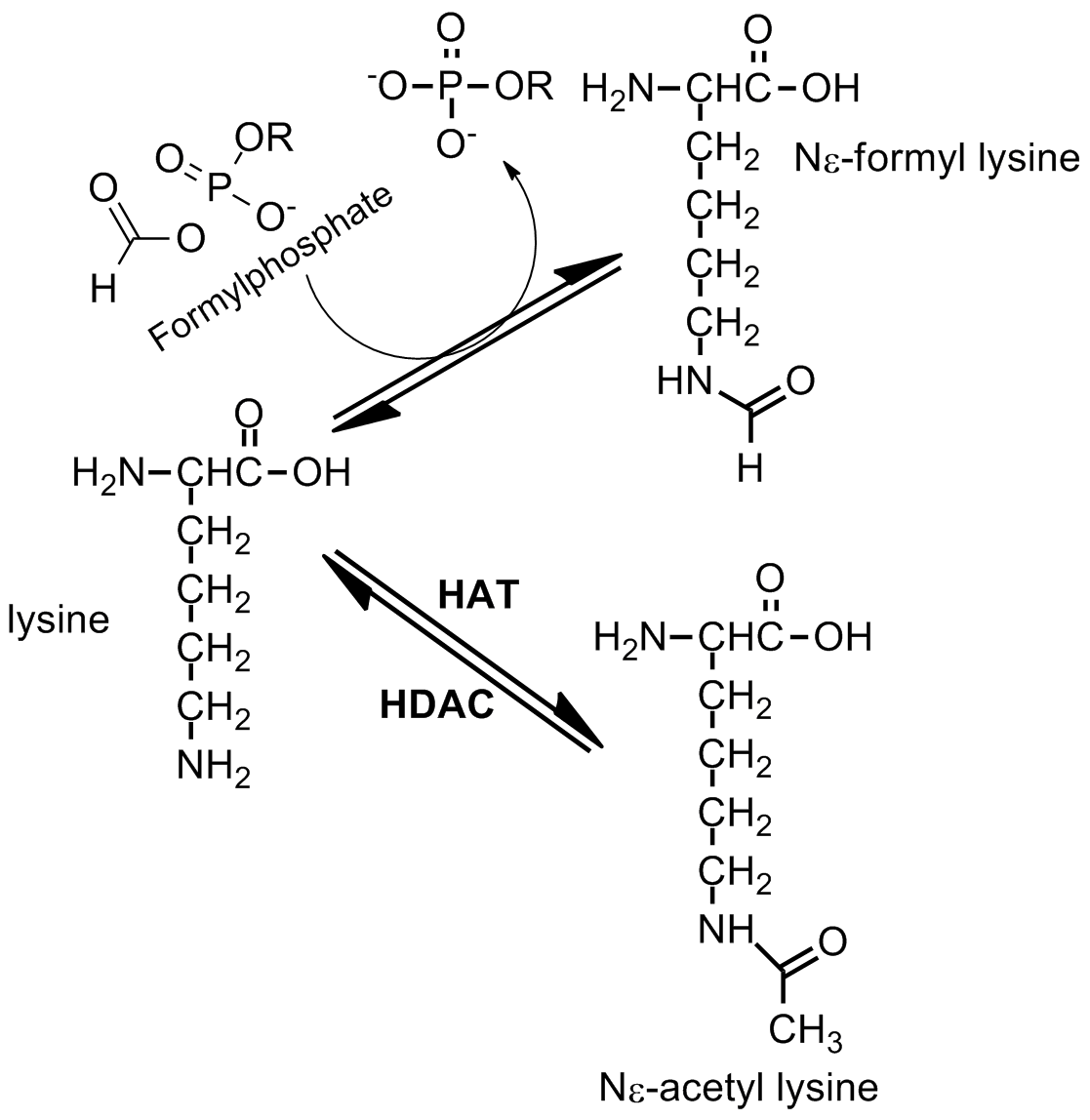
Formylation of lysine can compete with acetylation as a post-translational modification.

Formylation has been identified on the Nε of lysine residues in histones and proteins. This modification has been observed in linker histones and high mobility group proteins, it is highly abundant and it is believed to have a role in the epigenetics of chromatin function. Lysines that are formylated have been shown to play a role in DNA binding. Additionally, formylation has been detected on histone lysines that are also known to be acetylated and methylated. Thus, formylation may block other post-translational modifications. Formylation is detected most frequently on 19 different modification sites on Histone H1. The genetic expression of the cell is highly disrupted by formylation, which may cause diseases such as cancer. The development of these modifications may be due to oxidative stress.

In histone proteins, lysine is typically modified by Histone Acetyl-Transferases (HATs) and Histone Deacetylases (HDAC or KDAC). The acetylation of lysine is fundamental to the regulation and expression of certain genes. Oxidative stress creates a significantly different environment in which acetyl-lysine can be quickly outcompeted by the formation of formyl-lysine due to the high reactivity of formylphosphate species. This situation is currently believed to be caused by oxidative DNA damage. A mechanism for the formation of formylphosphate has been proposed, which it is highly dependent on oxidatively damaged DNA and mainly driven by radical chemistry within the cell. The formylphosphate produced can then be used to formylate lysine. Oxidative stress is believed to play a role in the availability of lysine residues in the surface of proteins and the possibility of being formylated.

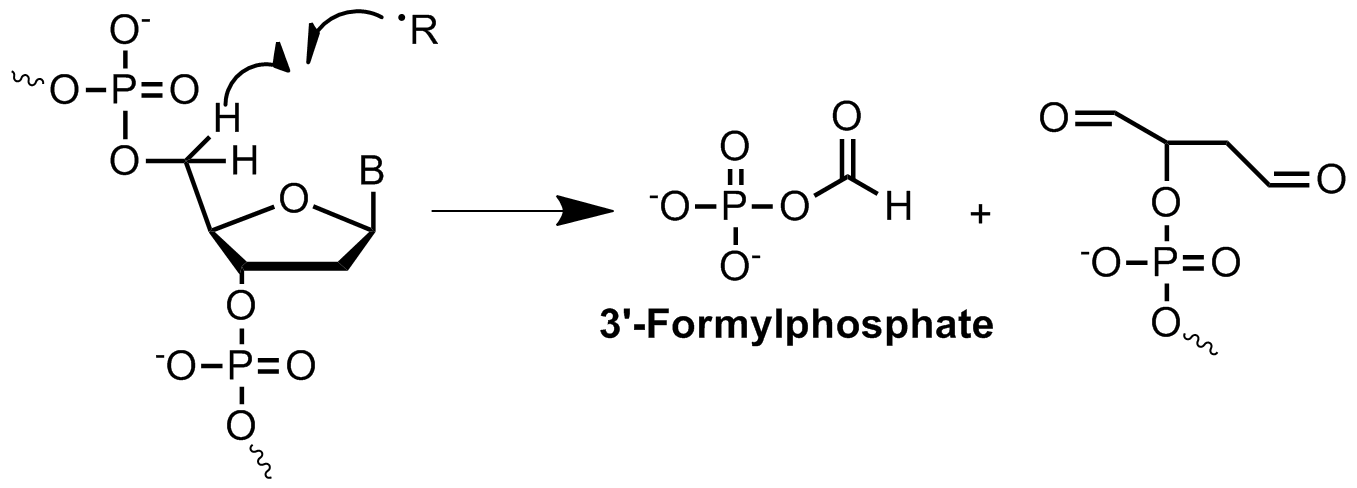
Formyl phosphate is a proposed product of oxidative DNA damage.

== Formylation in medicine ==
=== Formylation reactions as a drug target ===
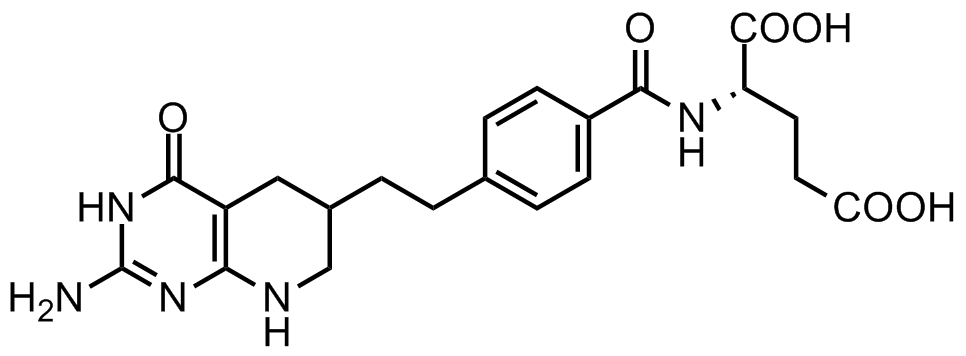
Chemical structure of lometrexol

Inhibition of enzymes involved in purine biosynthesis has been exploited as a potential drug target for chemotherapy.

Cancer cells require high concentrations of purines to facilitate division and tend to rely on de novo synthesis rather than the nucleotide salvage pathway. Several folate based inhibitors have been developed to inhibit formylation reactions by GAR transformylase and AICAR transformylase. The first GAR transformylase inhibitor Lometrexol [(6R)5,10-dideazatetrahydrofolate] was developed in the 1980s through a collaboration between Eli Lilly and academic laboratories. Although similar in structure to N10-formyl-THF, lometrexol is incapable of carrying out one carbon transfer reactions. Additionally, several GAR based inhibitors of GAR transformylase have also been synthesized. Development of folate based inhibitors have been found to be particularly challenging as the inhibitors also down regulate the enzyme folylpolyglutamate synthase, which adds additional γ-glutamates to monoglutamate folates and antifolates after entering the cell for increased enzyme affinity. This increased affinity can lead to antifolate resistance.

=== Leigh syndrome ===
Leigh syndrome is a neurodegenerative disorder that has been linked to a defect in an enzymatic formylation reaction. Leigh syndrome is typically associated with defects in oxidative phosphorylation, which occurs in the mitochondria. Exome sequencing, has been used to identify a mutation in the gene coding for mitochondrial methionyl-tRNA formyltransferase (MTFMT) in patients with Leigh syndrome. The c.626C>T mutation identified in MTFMT yielding symptoms of Leigh Syndrome is believed to alter exon splicing leading to a frameshift mutation and a premature stop codon. Individuals with the MTFMT c.626C>T mutation were found to have reduced fMet-tRNAMet levels and changes in the formylation level of mitochondrially translated COX1. This link provides evidence for the necessity of formylated methionine in initiation of expression for certain mitochondrial genes.

== See also ==
- Hydroformylation
- Hydroacylation

== See also ==
- N-Formylmethionine
