= Ethyl oleate =

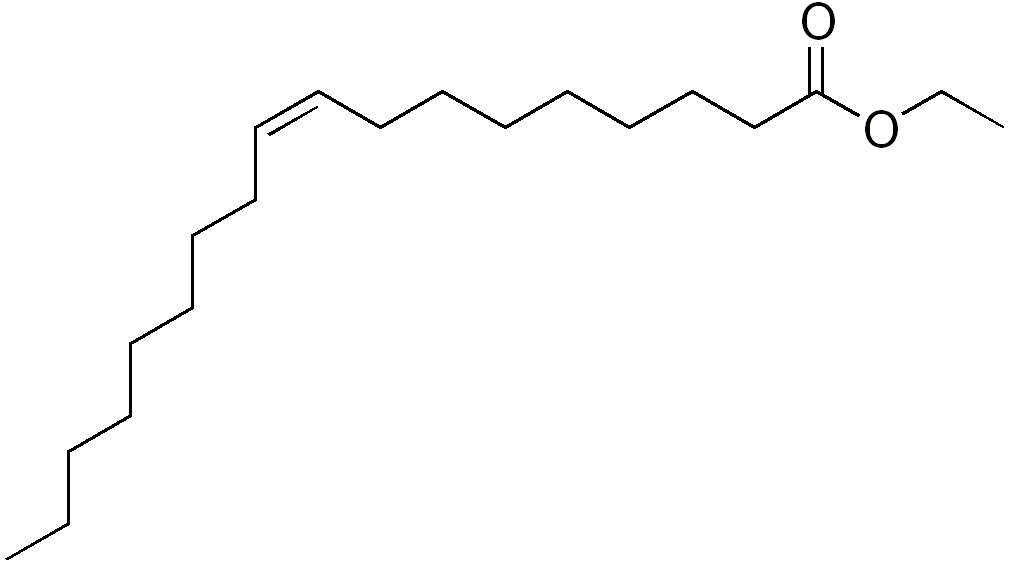

Names
- Preferred IUPAC name Ethyl (9Z)-octadec-9-enoate
- Other names Oleic acid ethyl ester

Identifiers
CAS Number	111-62-6
3D model (JSmol)	Interactive image
ChEBI	CHEBI:84940
ChEMBL	ChEMBL2106289
ChemSpider	4515636
ECHA InfoCard	100.003.536
KEGG	D04090
PubChem CID	5363269
UNII	Z2Z439864Y
CompTox Dashboard (EPA)	DTXSID3047633
- InChI: InChI=1S/C20H38O2/c1-3-5-6-7-8-9-10-11-12-13-14-15-16-17-18-19-20(21)22-4-2/h11-12H,3-10,13-19H2,1-2H3/b12-11- Key: LVGKNOAMLMIIKO-QXMHVHEDSA-N
- SMILES: O=C(OCC)CCCCCCC\C=C/CCCCCCCC

Properties
Chemical formula	C_{20}H_{38}O_{2}
Molar mass	310.522 g·mol^{−1}
Appearance	Colorless to light yellow liquid
Density	0.87 g/cm^{3}
Melting point	−32 °C (−26 °F; 241 K)
Boiling point	216–218 °C (421–424 °F; 489–491 K) (15 hPa)
Solubility in water	Insoluble

Hazards
Flash point	> 113 °C
- Except where otherwise noted, data are given for materials in their standard state (at 25 °C [77 °F], 100 kPa). verify (what is ?) Infobox references

Ethyl oleate is a fatty acid ester formed by the condensation of oleic acid and ethanol. It is a colorless oil although degraded samples can appear yellow.

== Use and occurrence ==
=== Additive ===
Ethyl oleate is used by compounding pharmacies as a vehicle for intramuscular drug delivery, in some cases to prepare the daily doses of progesterone in support of pregnancy. Studies that document the safe use of ethyl oleate in pregnancy for both the mother and the fetus have never been performed. It is regulated as a food additive in the U.S. by the Food and Drug Administration. Ethyl oleate is used as a solvent for pharmaceutical drug preparations involving lipophilic substances such as steroids.

=== Chemistry ===
It also finds use as a lubricant and a plasticizer. Louis Bouveault used ethyl oleate to demonstrate Bouveault–Blanc reduction, producing oleyl alcohol and ethanol, a method which was subsequently refined and published in Organic Syntheses.

=== Occurrence ===
Ethyl oleate has been identified as a primer pheromone in honeybees.

=== Precursor to other chemicals ===
By the process of ethenolysis, the methyl ester of oleic acid, converts to 1-decene and methyl 9-decenoate:

CH_{3}(CH_{2})_{7}CH=CH(CH_{2})_{7}CO_{2}Me + CH_{2}=CH_{2} → CH_{3}(CH_{2})_{7}CH=CH_{2} + MeO_{2}C(CH_{2})_{7}CH=CH_{2}

=== Medical aspects ===
Ethyl oleate is produced by the body during ethanol intoxication. It is one of the fatty acid ethyl esters (FAEE) produced after ingestion of ethanol. Some research literature implicates FAEEs such as ethyl oleate as the toxic mediators of ethanol in the body (pancreas, liver, heart, and brain). Ethyl oleate may be the toxic mediator of alcohol in fetal alcohol syndrome. The oral ingestion of ethyl oleate has been carefully studied and due to rapid degradation in the digestive tract it appears safe for oral ingestion.

== See also ==
- Butyl oleate
- Oleate
