= C18H36O =

The molecular formula C_{18}H_{36}O (molar mass: 268.48 g/mol, exact mass: 268.2766 u) may refer to:

- Octadecanal
- Oleyl alcohol, or octadecenol
