= Butyl oleate =

Identifiers
CAS Number	142-77-8
3D model (JSmol)	Interactive image
ChEBI	CHEBI:82946
ChEMBL	ChEMBL3183174
ChemSpider	4510551
ECHA InfoCard	100.005.054
EC Number	205-559-6
PubChem CID	5354342
UNII	487I65419Q
CompTox Dashboard (EPA)	DTXSID7027099
- InChI: InChI=1S/C22H42O2/c1-3-5-7-8-9-10-11-12-13-14-15-16-17-18-19-20-22(23)24-21-6-4-2/h12-13H,3-11,14-21H2,1-2H3/b13-12- Key: WIBFFTLQMKKBLZ-SEYXRHQNSA-N
- SMILES: CCCCCCCC/C=C\CCCCCCCC(=O)OCCCC

Properties
Chemical formula	C_{22}H_{42}O_{2}
Molar mass	338.576 g·mol^{−1}

Hazards
- GHS labelling
Pictograms	(GHS07: Exclamation mark)
Signal word	Warning
Hazard statements	H315, H319, H335
Precautionary statements	P261, P264, P264+P265, P271, P280, P302+P352, P304+P340, P305+P351+P338, P319, P321, P332+P317, P337+P317, P362+P364, P403+P233, P405, P501
- Except where otherwise noted, data are given for materials in their standard state (at 25 °C [77 °F], 100 kPa). Infobox references

Butyl oleate is a fatty acid ester and an organic chemical found in liquid form. It has the formula C_{22}H_{42}O_{2} and the CAS Registry Number 142-77-8. It is REACH registered and produced or imported into the European Union with the EC number of 205-559-6.

== Synthesis and reactions ==
It is formed by the condensation of oleic acid and butanol often using an enzyme as catalyst or other biobased catalysts. Ionic liquids may also be used as the catalyst. It undergoes the Bouveault–Blanc reduction with oleyl alcohol and butanol as the products.

== Alternative names ==
It is also known as Butyl cis-9-octadecenoate, Oleic acid butyl ester, butyl 9-octadecenoate and 1-butyl oleate. The IUPAC name is butyl (Z)-octadec-9-enoate.

== Uses ==
It has approval for use as a food additive in Europe and also the US by the FDA. Various other uses include as a lubricant and lubricant additive, paints and coatings additive, and as a plasticizer especially for PVC. Similar to other fatty acid esters, it has found use in biodiesel and as a fuel additive.

== See also ==
- Ethyl oleate
- Oleate
