= Oleyl oleate =

Names
- IUPAC name (9Z)-Octadec-9-enyl (9Z)-octadec-9-enoate

Identifiers
CAS Number	3687-45-4
3D model (JSmol)	Interactive image
ChEBI	CHEBI:75626
ChemSpider	4516817
ECHA InfoCard	100.020.891
EC Number	222-980-0
KEGG	D09361
PubChem CID	5364672
UNII	3X3L452Y85
CompTox Dashboard (EPA)	DTXSID20893537
- InChI: InChI=1S/C36H68O2/c1-3-5-7-9-11-13-15-17-19-21-23-25-27-29-31-33-35-38-36(37)34-32-30-28-26-24-22-20-18-16-14-12-10-8-6-4-2/h17-20H,3-16,21-35H2,1-2H3/b19-17-,20-18- Key: BARWIPMJPCRCTP-CLFAGFIQSA-N
- SMILES: CCCCCCCC/C=C\CCCCCCCCOC(=O)CCCCCCC/C=C\CCCCCCCC

Properties
Chemical formula	C_{36}H_{68}O_{2}
Molar mass	532.938 g·mol^{−1}
Appearance	Yellow liquid
Solubility in water	Insoluble
- Except where otherwise noted, data are given for materials in their standard state (at 25 °C [77 °F], 100 kPa). Infobox references

Oleyl oleate is a wax ester formed by the condensation of oleic acid and oleyl alcohol.

== Properties ==
Oleyl oleate has the chemical formula C_{36}H_{68}O_{2} and a molecular weight of 532.92 g/mol. It is the ester derived from oleic acid and oleyl alcohol, both featuring a cis double bond at the 9-position. The systematic name is (9Z)-octadec-9-en-1-yl (9Z)-octadec-9-enoate.

== Uses ==
Oleyl oleate is used as an emollient in cosmetics, providing skin conditioning and a non-greasy feel. It is an ingredient in creams, lotions, and other personal care products. Oleyl oleate serves as a synthetic analogue of jojoba oil, which consists primarily of similar long-chain wax esters, and has been explored for applications in lubricants and biofuels through biotechnological production in plant seeds.
