= Duff reaction =

Formylation reaction used in organic chemistry

The Duff reaction (after James Cooper Duff) also known as the hexamine aromatic formylation, is a formylation reaction used in organic chemistry for the synthesis of benzaldehydes. Hexamine acts as the formyl carbon source, while acetic acid or trifluoroacetic acid acts as both reagent and solvent. The process is generally inefficient, but is unusual in that it is able to attach multiple aldehyde groups. Other formylation reactions struggle to achieve this, as aldehydes are strongly deactivating.

The reaction requires strongly electron donating substituents on the aromatic ring such as in the case of phenols. Formylation occurs ortho to the electron donating substituent preferentially, unless the ortho positions are blocked, in which case the formylation occurs at the para position.

== Examples ==
The modified salicylaldehyde 3,5-di-tert-butylsalicylaldehyde is prepared by the Duff reaction:

Duff reaction 3,5-di-tert-butylsalicylaldehyde

The natural product syringaldehyde can also be prepared by the Duff reaction. In this example, formylation occurs at the position para to the phenolic OH.

Duff reaction syringaldehyde

Unlike other formylation reactions the Duff reaction is able to attach multiple aldehyde groups. If both ortho positions are vacant then a diformylation is possible, as in the formation of diformylcresol from p-cresol. Conversion of phenol to the corresponding 1,3,5-trialdehyde has also been reported

== Reaction mechanism ==
The reaction mechanism is related to that for the Reimer–Tiemann reaction, which uses chloroform as the formylating agent. Protonated hexamine ring-opens to expose an iminium group. Addition to the aromatic ring results in an intermediate at the oxidation state of a benzylamine. An intramolecular redox reaction then ensues, raising the benzylic carbon to the oxidation state of an aldehyde. The oxygen atom is provided by water on acid hydrolysis in the final step.

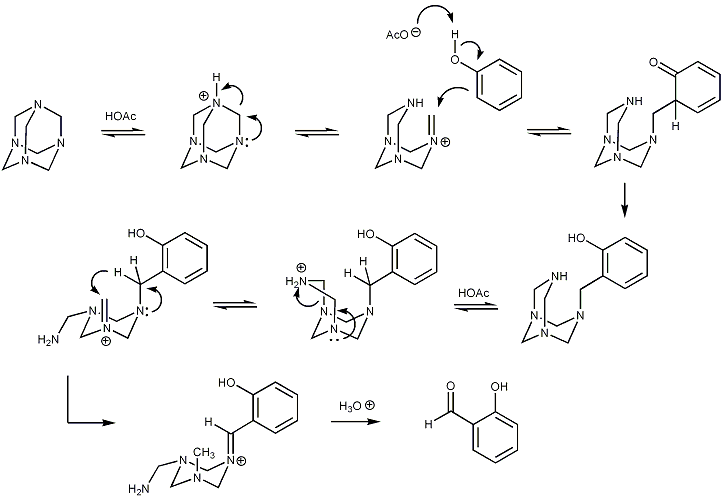
Duff reaction mechanism

== Historical references ==
Duff was a chemist at the College of Technology, Birmingham, around 1920–1950. who

- Duff, J. C.; Bills, E. J. (1934). "282. Reactions between hexamethylenetetramine and phenolic compounds. Part II. Formation of phenolic aldehydes. Distinctive behaviour of p-nitrophenol". J. Chem. Soc.: 1305. doi:10.1039/jr9340001305.
- Duff, J. C.; Bills, E. J. (1941). "96. A new general method for the preparation of o-hydroxyaldehydes from phenols and hexamethylenetetramine". J. Chem. Soc.: 547. doi:10.1039/jr9410000547.
- Duff, J. C.; Bills, E. J. (1945). "71. A new method for the preparation of p-dialkylaminobenzaldehydes". J. Chem. Soc.: 276. doi:10.1039/jr9450000276.
- Lloyd Noel Ferguson (1946). "The Synthesis of Aromatic Aldehydes". Chem. Rev. 38 (2): 227–254. doi:10.1021/cr60120a002. PMID 21024865.
- Ogata, Y.; Sugiura, F. (1968). "Kinetics and mechanism of the Duff reaction". Tetrahedron. 24 (14): 5001. doi:10.1016/S0040-4020(01)88408-8.

== See also ==
- Bouveault aldehyde synthesis
- Bodroux-Chichibabin aldehyde synthesis
- Reimer-Tiemann reaction
- Sommelet reaction
- Vilsmeier-Haack reaction
