= C2H4Cl2O =

The molecular formula C_{2}H_{4}Cl_{2}O (molar mass: 114.96 g/mol, exact mass: 113.9639 u) may refer to:

- Bis(chloromethyl) ether
- Dichloromethyl methyl ether
