= Formate =

Salt or ester of formic acid

- Stereo skeletal formula of formate

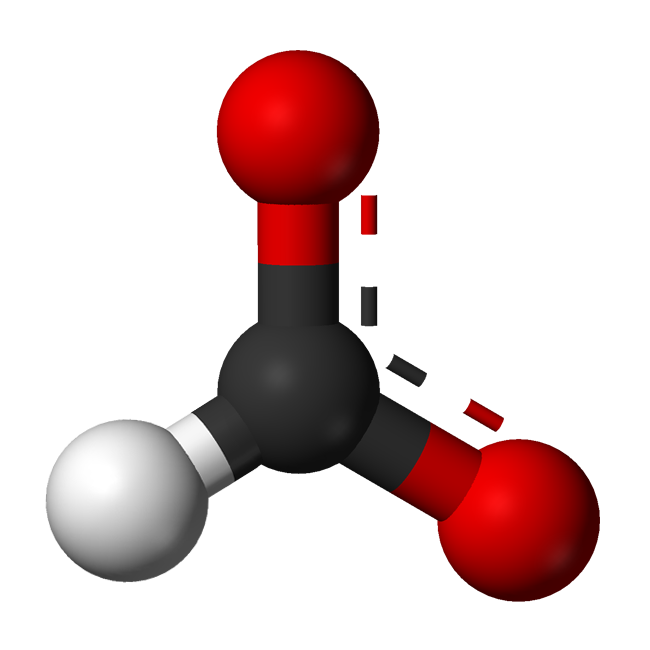
Aromatic ball and stick model of formate
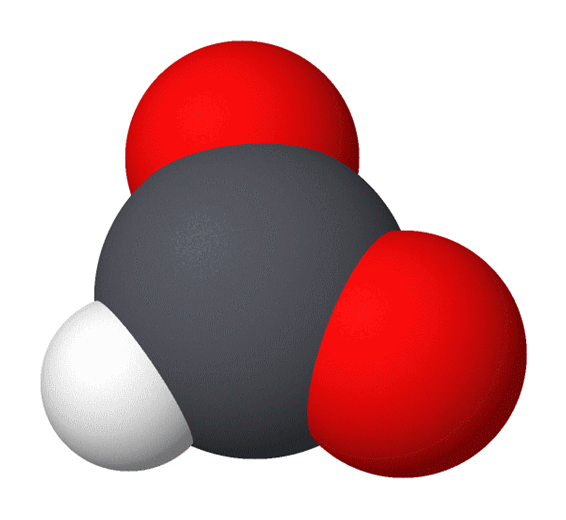
Space-filling model of formate

Names
- Preferred IUPAC name Formate
- Systematic IUPAC name Methanoate
- Other names Formylate; Methylate; Isocarbonite; Carbonite(1-); Hydrogencarboxylate; Metacarbonoate; Oxocarbinate; Oxomethyl oxide ion Oxomethoxide

Identifiers
| CAS Number | 71-47-6 |
| 3D model (JSmol) | Interactive image |
| ChEBI | CHEBI:15740 |
| ChemSpider | 277 |
| Gmelin Reference | 1006 |
| KEGG | C00058 |
| MeSH | Formates |
| PubChem CID | 283 |
| UNII | 0YIW783RG1 |
- InChI: InChI=1S/CH2O2/c2-1-3/h1H,(H,2,3)/p-1 Key: BDAGIHXWWSANSR-UHFFFAOYSA-M
- SMILES: O=C[O-]

Properties
| Chemical formula | HCOO^{−} or HCO^{−}_{2} |
| Molar mass | 45.017 g mol^{−1} |
| Conjugate acid | Formic acid |
- Except where otherwise noted, data are given for materials in their standard state (at 25 °C [77 °F], 100 kPa). Infobox references

Formate (IUPAC name: methanoate) is the conjugate base of formic acid. Formate is an anion (HCO^{−}_{2}) or its derivatives such as ester of formic acid. The salts and esters are generally colorless.

== Fundamentals ==
When dissolved in water, formic acid converts to formate:

HCO_{2}H → HCO^{−}_{2} + H^{+}.

Formate is a planar anion. The two oxygen atoms are equivalent and bear a partial negative charge. The remaining C-H bond is not acidic.

== Biochemistry ==
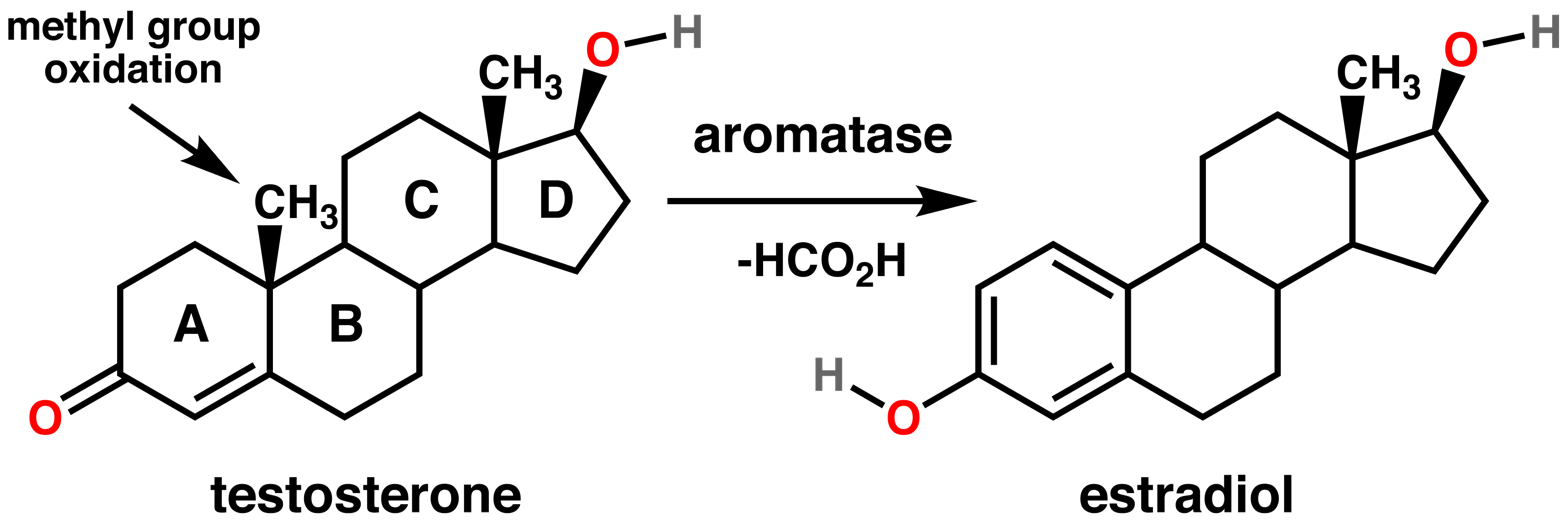

Formate is a common C-1 source in living systems. It is formed from many precursors including choline, serine, and sarcosine. It provides a C-1 source in the biosynthesis of some nucleic acids. Formate (or formic acid) is invoked as a leaving group in the demethylation of some sterols. These conversions are catalyzed by aromatase enzymes using O_{2} as the oxidant. Specific conversions include testosterone to estradiol and androstenedione to estrone.

Formate is reversibly oxidized by the enzyme formate dehydrogenase from Desulfovibrio gigas:

HCO^{−}_{2} → CO_{2} + H^{+} + 2 e^{−}.

== Formate esters ==
Formate esters have the formula HCOOR (alternative way of writing formula ROC(O)H or RO_{2}CH). Many form spontaneously when alcohols dissolve in formic acid; contrariwise, they hydrolyze easily in base. Some formate esters arise by the addition of formic acid to alkenes.

An important formate ester is methyl formate, which is produced as an intermediate en route to formic acid. Methanol and carbon monoxide react in the presence of a strong base, such as sodium methoxide:

CH_{3}OH + CO → HCOOCH_{3}.

Hydrolysis of methyl formate gives formic acid and regenerates methanol:

HCOOCH_{3} → HCOOH + CH_{3}OH.

In laboratory, formate esters can be used to produce pure carbon monoxide.

Reaction with phosphorus pentachloride does not chlorolyze the ester bond, instead forming an (unusual) dichloromethyl ether.

Formate esters often are fragrant or have distinctive odors. Compared to the more common acetate esters, formate esters are less commonly used commercially because they are less stable. Ethyl formate is found in some confectionaries.

== Formate salts ==
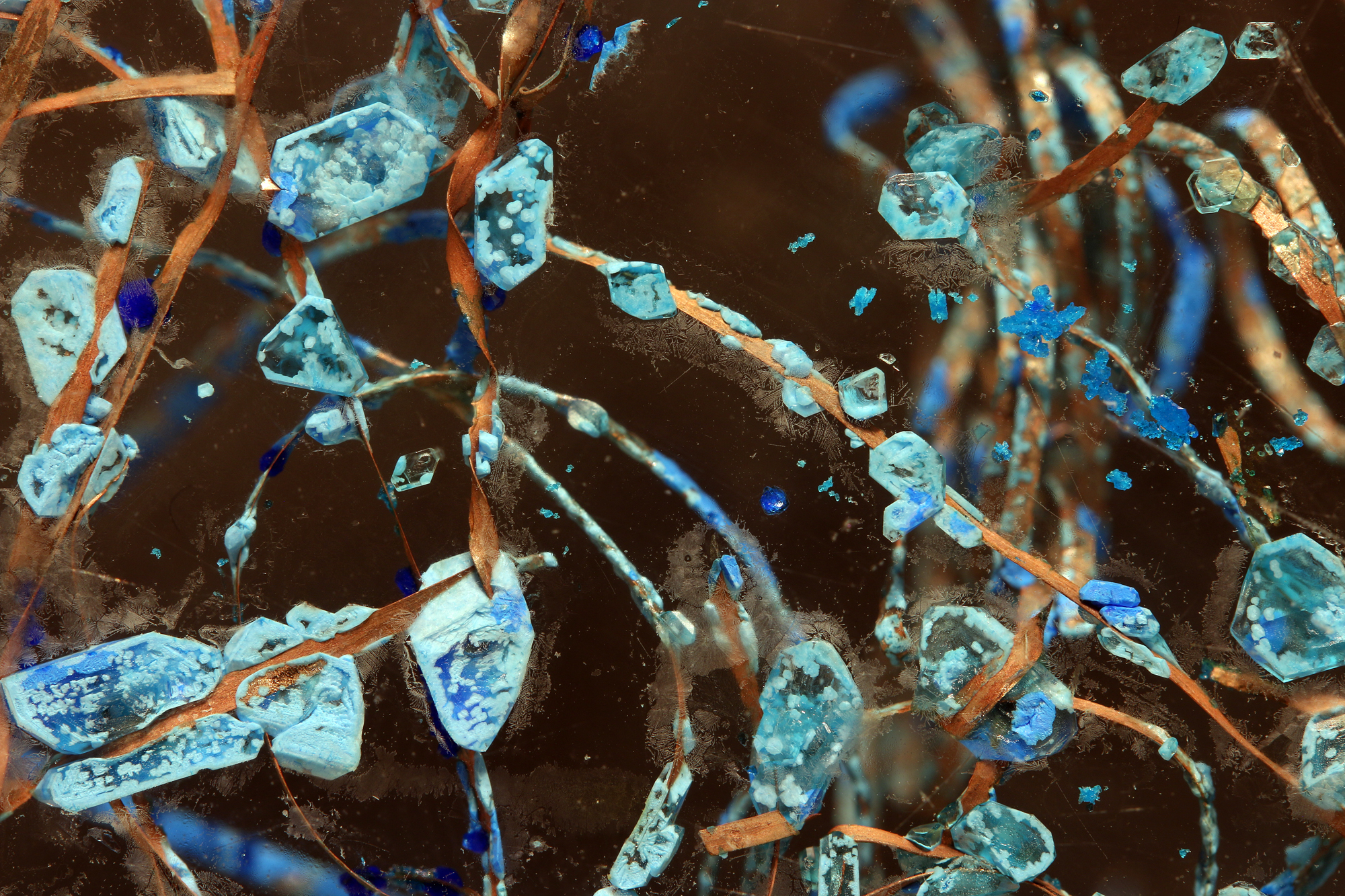
Copper(II) formate hydrate

Formate salts have the formula M(O_{2}CH)(H_{2}O)_{x}. Such salts are prone to decarboxylation. For example, hydrated nickel formate decarboxylates at about 200 °C with reduction of the Ni^{2+} to finely powdered nickel metal:

Ni(HCO_{2})_{2}(H_{2}O)_{2} → Ni + 2 CO_{2} + 2 H_{2}O + H_{2}.

Such fine powders are useful as hydrogenation catalysts.

== Examples ==
- ethyl formate, CH_{3}CH_{2}(HCOO)
- sodium formate, Na(HCOO)
- potassium formate, K(HCOO)
- caesium formate, Cs(HCOO); see Caesium: Petroleum exploration
- methyl formate, CH_{3}(HCOO)
- methyl chloroformate, CH_{3}OCOCl
- triethyl orthoformate
- trimethyl orthoformate, C_{4}H_{10}O_{3}
- phenyl formate HCOOC_{6}H_{5}
- amyl formate
