= Acyloin condensation =

Condensation reaction

Reaction type	Coupling reaction

Identifiers
Organic Chemistry Portal	acyloin-condensation
RSC ontology ID	RXNO:0000085

Acyloin condensation is a reductive coupling of two carboxylic esters using impure metallic sodium to yield an α-hydroxyketone, also known as an acyloin.

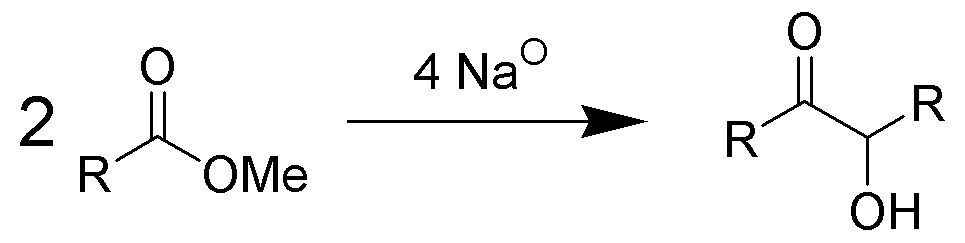
The acyloin condensation

The reaction is most successful when R is aliphatic and saturated, and typically performed with a silyl chloride reactant to trap the product as a disilyl enediol ether.

The reaction is performed in aprotic solvents with a high boiling point, such as benzene and toluene, in an oxygen-free atmosphere (as even traces of oxygen interfere with the reaction path and reduce the yield). Protic solvents effect the Bouveault-Blanc ester reduction rather than condensation.

Independent of dilution, acyloin condensation of a diester favours intramolecular cyclisation (for all but the smallest rings) over intermolecular polymerisation. This effect is believed to originate in weak adsorption of the ester terminals at nearby sites on the sodium metal.

== Acyloin cyclization of diesters ==
The acyloin condensation

Intramolecular acyloin condensation is a classical approach for aliphatic ring synthesis, and "one of the best ways of closing rings of 10 members or more". 3-membered rings are not accessible through the acyloin condensation, 5- and 6-membered rings form in high yield (80 – 85% yield), 4-, 7-, 10-, and 11-membered rings form in moderate yield (50 – 60% yield), 8- and 9-membered rings form in poor to modest yield (30 – 40% yield), and finally, 12-membered and higher rings form in good to excellent yields (>70% yield). For larger rings, unsaturation does not inhibit cyclization. Although yields for 4-membered and medium-sized rings are poor to moderate, the acyloin condensation constitutes one of the earliest practical cyclization reactions to prepare these challenging ring sizes.

Tropolone is prepared via an initial acyloin condensation that delivers 2-hydroxycycloheptanone:

Route to 2-hydroxylcycloheptanone via acyloin condensation

The dimethyl ester of sebacic acid can be converted to cyclodecanediol by acyloin condensation followed by hydrogenation using a copper chromite catalyst.

=== Comparison with other ring syntheses ===
The Dieckmann method is practical only for 5- to 8-membered rings (with modest yields for 7- and 8-membered). The Thorpe method is more easily modified via high dilution (e.g., 0.001 M in benzene/ether) to enable the synthesis of large rings, but 4-membered and 9- to 13-membered rings are still not accessible. Concentration is much less important a factor for obtaining high yields for the acyloin condensation, as the reaction occurs on the surface of the sodium metal. Although, the need for sodium metal limits the functional group tolerance of the reaction, compared to more modern cyclization reactions (e.g. Yamaguchi esterification, ring-closing olefin metathesis), the acyloin condensation continues to be used in the synthesis of complex natural products for the preparation of challenging ring systems.

== Mechanism ==
The mechanism consists of four steps:

1. Oxidative ionization of two sodium atoms on the double bond of two ester molecules.
2. Wurtz-type coupling between two molecules of the homolytic ester derivative. Alkoxy-eliminations in both sides occur, producing a 1,2-diketone.
3. Oxidative ionization of two sodium atoms on both diketone double bonds. The sodium enediolate is formed.
4. Neutralization with water to form the enediol, which tautomerizes to acyloin.

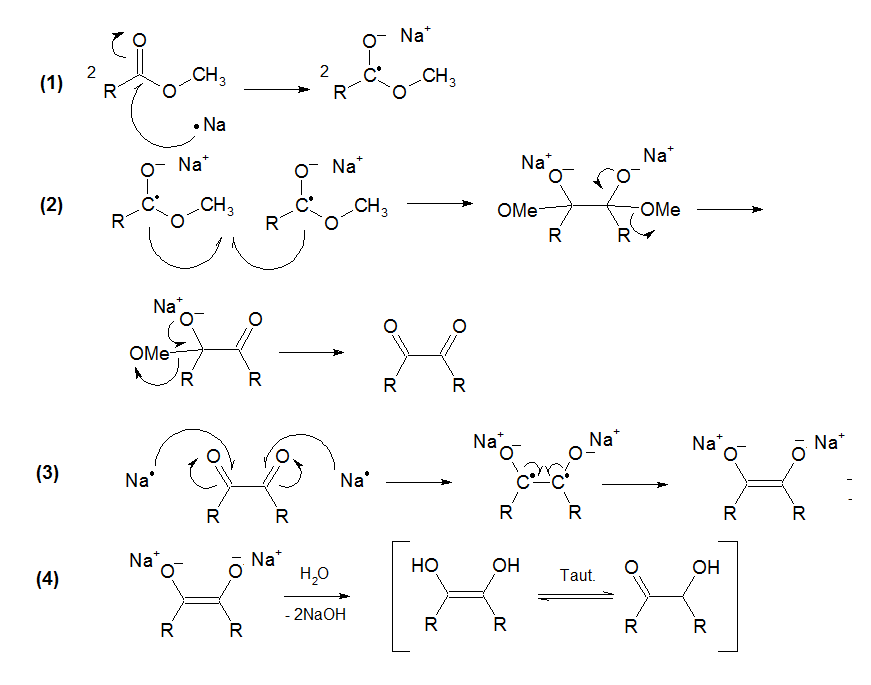
The acyloin condensation

== Additives ==
The intermediate enediolate dianion can be trapped with trimethylsilyl chloride.

The reaction also produces stoichiometric quantities of alkoxide base, which can catalyze the competing Dieckmann condensation. Rühlmann's's technique traps the alkoxide and the acyloin with trimethylchlorosilane for considerably improved yields. The disilyl diether can then be cloven with acidified water or methanol.

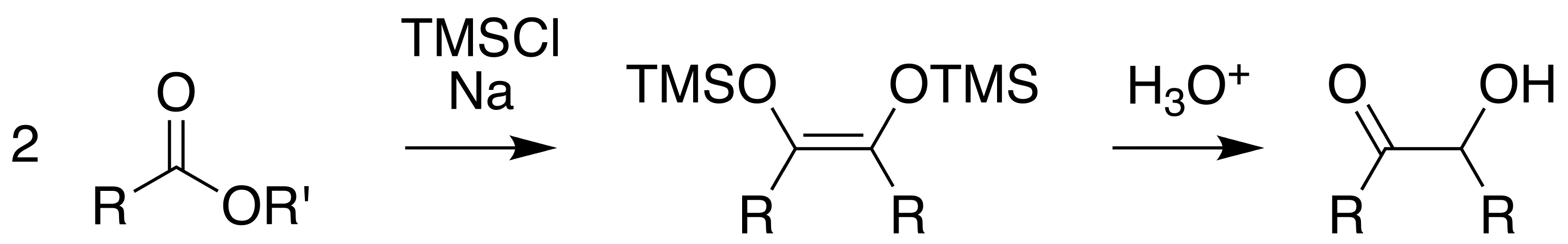
Rühlmann-method

In general, highly pure sodium can result in lower yields. The reaction is proposed to be influenced by a potassium impurity, which served as a catalyst. Sodium–potassium alloy is a viable reductant.

Usually toluene, dioxane, tetrahydrofuran or acyclic dialkylethers are employed as solvents. Advantageously also N-methyl-morpholine has been used. It allowed in some cases a successful reaction, where an otherwise-insoluble product coated the sodium sand, inhibiting the reaction.

== See also ==
- Benzoin condensation
- Bouveault–Blanc reduction
- Claisen condensation
- Dieckmann condensation
