= Phenyl formate =

Names
- IUPAC name Phenyl formate
- Other names: Formic acid phenyl ester; Methanoic acid phenyl ester; Phenoxyformaldehyde; Phenyl methanoate

Identifiers
CAS Number	1864-94-4
3D model (JSmol)	Interactive image
ChEMBL	ChEMBL366050
ChemSpider	67201
EC Number	217-471-5
PubChem CID	74626
UNII	V4EL38P3VW
CompTox Dashboard (EPA)	DTXSID30171898
- InChI: InChI=1S/C7H6O2/c8-6-9-7-4-2-1-3-5-7/h1-6H Key: GEOWCLRLLWTHDN-UHFFFAOYSA-N
- SMILES: C1=CC=C(C=C1)OC=O

Properties
Chemical formula	C_{7}H_{6}O_{2}
Molar mass	122.123 g·mol^{−1}
Appearance	Colorless liquid
Odor	Sweet, fruity
Density	1.120 g/cm^{3} at 20 °C
Boiling point	165.2 °C (760 mmHg); 93-102 °C (90 mmHg); 62 °C (1 mmHg); 35 °C (0.1 mmHg)
Solubility in water	Practically immiscible with water (1.65 g/L)
Solubility	Soluble in ethanol, diethyl ether, benzene and oils.
Solubility in methanol	1104.95 g/L
Solubility in ethanol	1072.45 g/L
Solubility in isopropanol	611.03 g/L
Vapor pressure	2.49 mmHg
Refractive index (n_{D})	1.511

Hazards
- Occupational safety and health (OHS/OSH)
Main hazards	Serious eye and respiratory irritation
- GHS labelling
Pictograms	(GHS07: Exclamation mark)
Signal word	Warning
Hazard statements	H302, H315, H319, H335
Precautionary statements	P261, P264, P264+P265, P270, P271, P280, P301+P317, P302+P352, P304+P340, P305+P351+P338, P319, P321, P330, P332+P317, P337+P317, P362+P364, P403+P233, P405, P501
NFPA 704 (fire diamond)	2 1 0
Flash point	71 °C (160 °F; 344 K)

Related compounds
Related compounds	Phenyl acetate
- Except where otherwise noted, data are given for materials in their standard state (at 25 °C [77 °F], 100 kPa). Infobox references

Phenyl formate is an organic compound with the formula HCOOC_{6}H_{5}, often abbreviated as HCOOPh, where Ph stands for phenyl. It is a colorless liquid with a characteristic sweet, fruity odor. It is the phenyl ester of formic acid.

== Synthesis ==
Phenyl formate is synthesized by the esterification reaction between formic acid and phenol at 105 °C for 4 hours, in toluene as a solvent, using an acid as a catalyst such as p-toluenesulfonic acid.

HCOOH + C_{6}H_{5}OH → HCOOC_{6}H_{5} + H_{2}O

== Uses ==
Phenyl formate releases carbon monoxide and phenol under relatively mild conditions, often catalyzed by a weak base, like tertiary amines.

HCOOC_{6}H_{5} C_{6}H_{5}OH + CO

This property of phenyl formate avoids the necessity of direct usage of carbon monoxide and the hazards of high toxicity and flammability associated with it.

The chemical control of the rate of carbon monoxide generation is the key to the development of the external carbon monoxide-free palladium-catalyzed phenoxycarbonylation of haloarenes at room temperature. Because of the mild reaction conditions and wide range of substrates, the phenoxycarbonylation makes a general, safe, and practical method to synthesize arenecarboxylic acid esters.

Phenyl formate is used as a flavoring agent in the food industry. It is also used for the formylation of amines.

== Reactions ==
The reaction of phenyl formate with ammonia, primary and secondary amines (known as aminolysis) results in the formation of formamides and phenol.

HCOOC_{6}H_{5} + NH_{3} → HCONH_{2} + C_{6}H_{5}OH
HCOOC_{6}H_{5} + NH(CH_{3})_{2} → HCON(CH_{3})_{2} + C_{6}H_{5}OH
