= Alfred Rieche =

German chemist (1902–2001)

- Born: 28 April 1902; Dortmund, Germany
- Died: 6 November 2001 (aged 99); Berlin, Germany
- Education: University of Erlangen
- Known for: Rieche formylation
- Scientific career
- Doctoral advisor: Rudolf Pummerer

Alfred Rieche (28 April 1902 – 6 November 2001) was a German chemist.
