= Diformylcresol =

Names
- IUPAC name 2-hydroxy-5-methylisophthalaldehyde
- Other names 2,6-diformyl-4-methylphenol 2-hydroxy-5-methyl-1,3-benzenedicarboxaldehyde

Identifiers
CAS Number	7310-95-4
3D model (JSmol)	Interactive image
ChEMBL	ChEMBL3904097
ChemSpider	73760
ECHA InfoCard	100.027.971
EC Number	230-768-4
PubChem CID	81744
UNII	V6R37R6AU3
CompTox Dashboard (EPA)	DTXSID60223374
- InChI: InChI=1S/C9H8O3/c1-6-2-7(4-10)9(12)8(3-6)5-11/h2-5,12H,1H3 Key: ZBOUXALQDLLARY-UHFFFAOYSA-N
- SMILES: CC1=CC(=C(C(=C1)C=O)O)C=O

Properties
Chemical formula	C_{9}H_{8}O_{3}
Molar mass	164.160 g·mol^{−1}
Appearance	white solid
Density	1.433 g/cm^{3}
Melting point	113 °C (235 °F; 386 K)

Hazards
- GHS labelling
Pictograms	(GHS07: Exclamation mark)
Signal word	Warning
Hazard statements	H315, H319, H335
Precautionary statements	P261, P264, P271, P280, P302+P352, P304+P340, P305+P351+P338, P312, P321, P332+P313, P337+P313, P362, P403+P233, P405, P501
- Except where otherwise noted, data are given for materials in their standard state (at 25 °C [77 °F], 100 kPa). Infobox references

Diformylcresol is an organic compound with the formula CH_{3}C_{6}H_{2}(CHO)_{2}OH. The 2,6-diformyl derivative of p-cresol is the most common isomer and is a white solid at room temperature.

Diformylcresol condenses with amines to give diimines that are widely studied as binucleating ligands.

== Synthesis ==
Formyl groups (aldehydes) are fairly strong deactivating groups for electrophilic aromatic substitution reactions, hence double-addition to a phenol requires forcing conditions. Diformylcresol may be prepared from p-cresol by the Reimer-Tiemann reaction or the Duff reaction.

The corresponding reaction of phenol would be expected to lead to formylation of the 4-position vs 2,6-selectivity.

== Related compounds ==
- salicylaldehyde, a phenol with only one flanking formyl group
