= Bouveault aldehyde synthesis =

Chemical reaction

Named after	Louis Bouveault
Reaction type	Carbon-carbon bond forming reaction

Identifiers
RSC ontology ID	RXNO:0000533

The Bouveault aldehyde synthesis (also known as the Bouveault reaction) is a one-pot substitution reaction that replaces an alkyl or aryl halide with a formyl group using a N,N-disubstituted formamide. For primary alkyl halides this produces the homologous aldehyde one carbon longer. For aryl halides this produces the corresponding carbaldehyde. The Bouveault aldehyde synthesis is an example of a formylation reaction, and is named for French scientist Louis Bouveault.

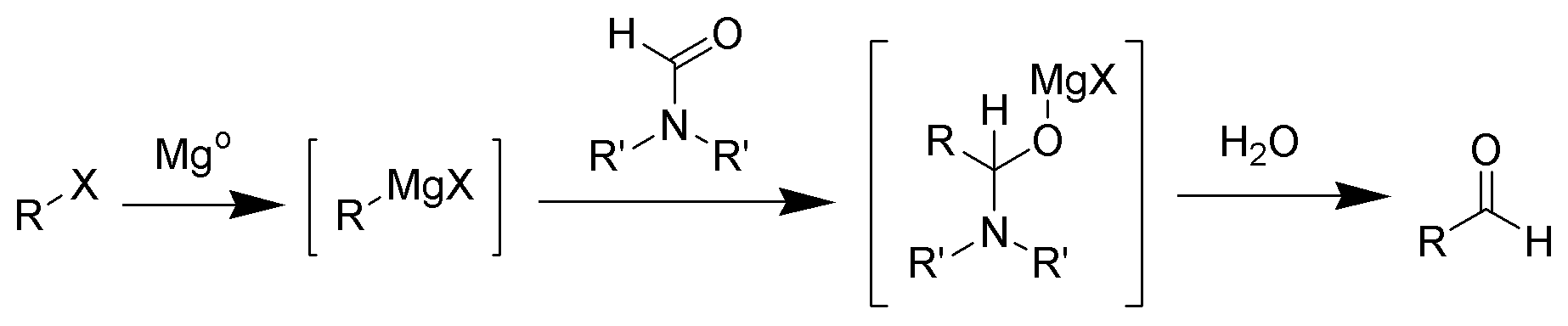

== Reaction mechanism ==
The first step of the Bouveault aldehyde synthesis is the formation of the Grignard reagent. Upon addition of a N,N-disubstituted formamide (such as dimethylformamide) a hemiaminal is formed, which can easily be hydrolyzed into the desired aldehyde.

== Variations ==
Variants using organolithium reagents instead of magnesium-based Grignard reagents are also considered Bouveault aldehyde syntheses.

== See also ==
- Bodroux–Chichibabin aldehyde synthesis
- Bouveault–Blanc reduction
- Duff reaction
