= Bouveault–Blanc reduction =

Type of chemical reaction

Bouveault-Blanc reduction
| Named after | Louis Bouveault; Gustave Louis Blanc |
| Reaction type | Organic redox reaction |

Identifiers
| Organic Chemistry Portal | bouveault-blanc-reduction |
| RSC ontology ID | RXNO:0000119 |

The Bouveault–Blanc reduction is a chemical reaction in which an ester is reduced to primary alcohols using absolute ethanol and sodium metal. It was first reported by Louis Bouveault and Gustave Louis Blanc in 1903. Bouveault and Blanc demonstrated the reduction of ethyl oleate and n-butyl oleate to oleyl alcohol. Refined versions of the conversion have been reported.

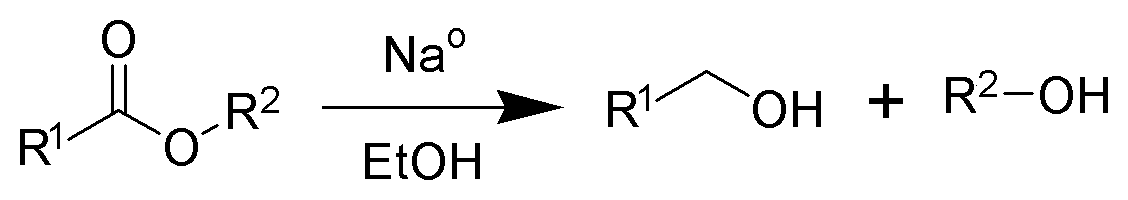

This reaction is used commercially although for laboratory scale reactions it was made obsolete by the introduction of lithium aluminium hydride.

== Reaction mechanism ==
Sodium metal is a one-electron reducing agent. Four equivalents of sodium are required to fully reduce each ester. The electron-transfer reaction occurs at the surface of the metal, thus finely divided sodium is employed. Ethanol serves as a proton source. The reaction produces sodium alkoxides, according to the following stoichiometry:

RCOOR' + 4 Na + 2 CH_{3}CH_{2}OH → RCH_{2}ONa + R'ONa + 2 CH_{3}CH_{2}ONa

In practice, considerable sodium is consumed by the formation of hydrogen. For this reason, an excess of sodium is often required. Because the hydrolysis of sodium is rapid, not to mention dangerous, the Bouveault–Blanc reaction requires anhydrous ethanol and can give low yields with insufficiently dry ethanol. The mechanism of the reaction follows:

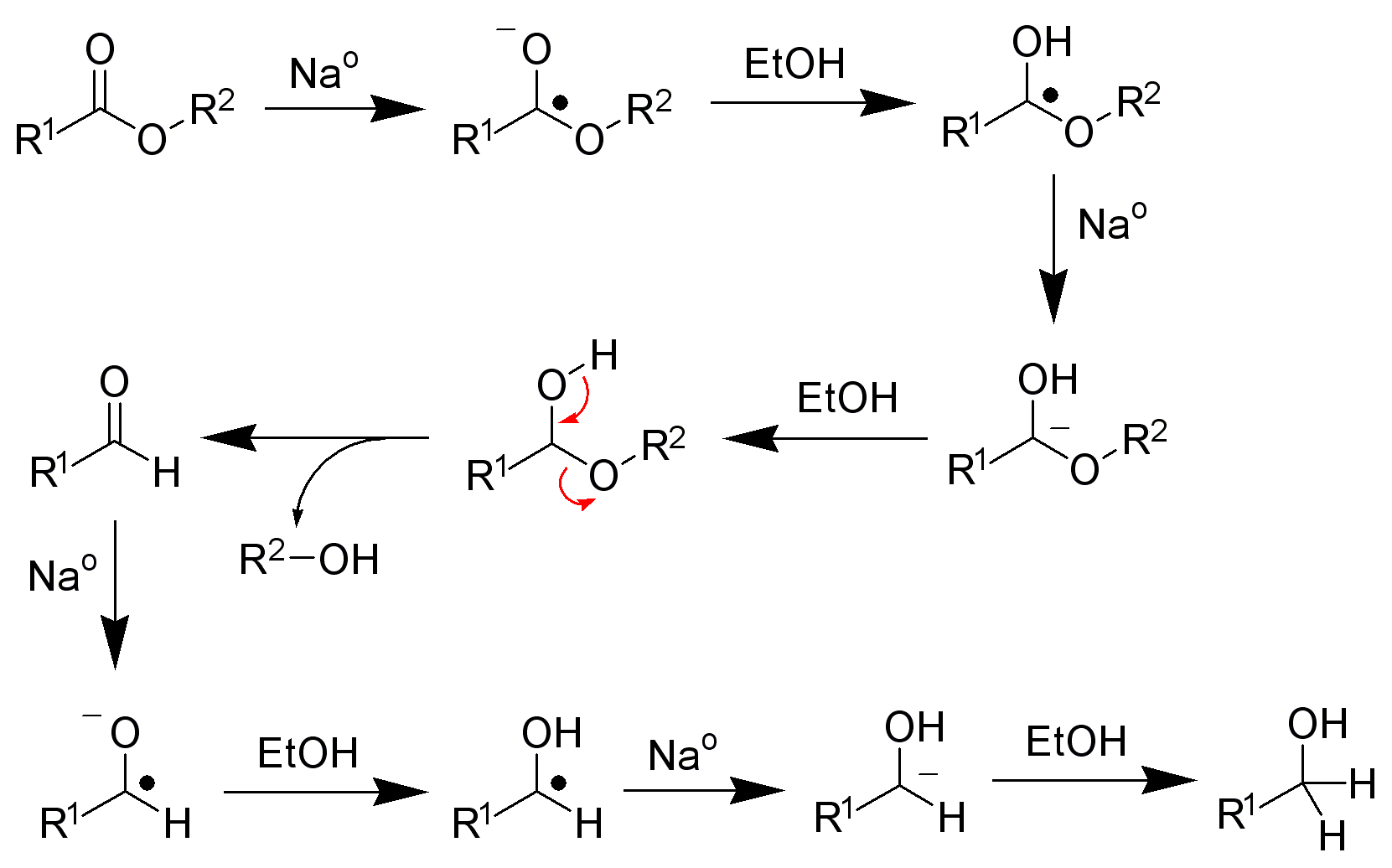

Consistent with this mechanism, sodium-ethanol mixtures will also reduce ketones to alcohols.

This approach to reducing esters was widely used prior to the availability of hydride reducing agents such as lithium aluminium hydride and related reagents. It requires vigorous reaction conditions and has a significant risk of fires, explaining its relative unpopularity. One modification involves encapsulating the alkali metal into a silica gel, which has a safety and yield profile similar to that of hydride reagents. Another modification uses a sodium dispersion.

== See also ==
- Acyloin condensation – The reductive coupling of esters, using sodium, to yield an α-hydroxyketone
- Akabori amino-acid reaction – The reduction of amino acid esters, by sodium, to yield aldehydes
- Birch reduction – For the reduction of alkenes using sodium
- Bouveault aldehyde synthesis – Another organometallic reaction by Bouveault where a Grignard reagent is converted to an aldehyde

== Additional historic references ==
- Bouveault, L.; Blanc, G. (1903). "Préparation des alcools primaires au moyen des acides correspondants" [Preparation of primary alcohols by means of the corresponding acids]. Compt. Rend. (in French). 137: 60–62.
- Bouveault, L.; Blanc, G. (1904). "Transformation des acides monobasiques saturés dans les alcools primaires correspondants" [Transforming saturated monobasic acids into the corresponding primary alcohols]. Bull. Soc. Chim. Fr. (in French). 31: 666–672.
