= Shirō Akabori =

Japanese chemist and University Professor

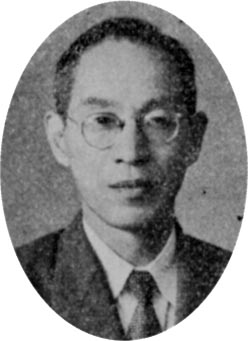
Shirō Akabori

Shirō Akabori (赤堀 四郎 Akahori Shirō), 20 October 1900 – 3 November 1992 in Chihama, Ogasa (now Kakegawa, Shizuoka Prefecture), was a Japanese chemist and university professor, known for the Akabori amino-acid reactions.

== Life and education ==
After graduating from public school, he began training as a pharmacist at Chiba medical school, now Chiba University, in 1918. After graduating in 1921, he joined the pharmaceutical company Momotani Juntenkan. The company hired him as an assistant to the chemist Nishizawa Yūshichi of the Imperial University of Tokyo, where he was taught by Ikeda Kikunae. In the summer of the same year, he followed Nishizawa for a short stay at the Tohoku Imperial University to learn organic chemistry from Majima Rikō. Here he then began research in this field thanks to a scholarship from the company Ajinomoto, which he completed in 1925. From 1930 he held lectures under Majima and obtained a doctoral degree in 1931.

From 1932 to 1935, he began further studies abroad. After his return, Akabori became an assistant professor at Osaka University, in 1939 full professor, in 1947 dean of the faculty of natural sciences, and in 1949 dean of the new Faculty for Liberal Arts. In 1953 he gained the additional title of professor of the newly-founded Institute for Applied Microbiology at the University of Tokyo. From 1958 he was the Director of the "Protein-Institute" (蛋白質研究所, "Tanpakushitsu Kenkyūjo") at Osaka University. Beginning in 1960, Akabori served two terms as rector of the University. He retired in 1966. He also became a member of Academy of Sciences Leopoldina in 1966. and president of the Institute of Physical and Chemical Research (Riken) in 1967.

He died in Shizuoka Prefecture on November 3, 1992.

== Work ==
Akabori's main research focus was on the chemistry of amino acids and proteins, as well as the biochemistry of their oxidation processes. As a result, he developed a method for the reduction of α-amino acids to α-amino aldehydes (Akabori reduction) in 1931, and in 1943 a synthesis of amino alcohols (Akabori synthesis). In 1952 he reported a method for determination of C-terminal amino acids in proteins by their reaction with hydrazine. In this case, all amino acids (except the C-terminal one) are transformed into hydrazides.

In 1955 he received the prize of Japanese Academy of Sciences and ten years later, the Japanese Order of Culture. The same year, Akabori was recognized as a Person of Cultural Merit and a year later he became an honorary citizen of his hometown. In 1975 Akabori received the Order of the Sacred Treasure.
