= Rieche formylation =

Chemical reaction

Named after	Alfred Rieche
Reaction type	Substitution reaction

Rieche formylation is a type of formylation reaction. The substrates are electron rich aromatic compounds, such as mesitylene or phenols, with dichloromethyl methyl ether acting as the formyl source. The catalyst is titanium tetrachloride and the workup is acidic. The reaction is named after Alfred Rieche who discovered it in 1960.

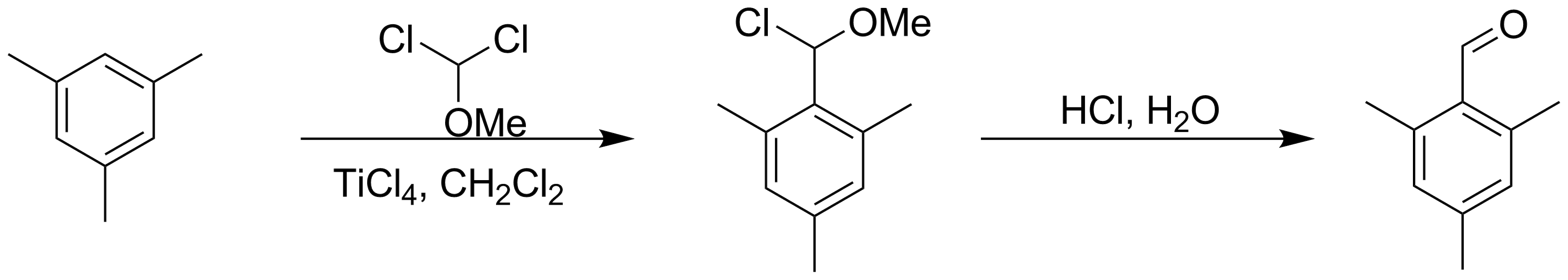

== See also ==
Reimer–Tiemann reaction.
