= Binucleating ligand =

Dicopper complex derived from diformylcresol and ethylenediamine.

In coordination chemistry, a binucleating ligand binds two metals. Much attention has been directed toward such ligands that hold metals side-by-side, such that the pair of metals can bind substrates cooperatively.

A variety of metalloenzymes feature bimetallic active sites. Examples include superoxide dismutase, urease, nickel-iron hydrogenase. Many Non-heme iron proteins have diiron active sites, e.g. ribonucleotide reductase and hemerythrin.

== Examples ==
Usually binucleating ligands feature bridging ligands, such as phenoxide, pyrazolate, or pyrazine, as well as other donor groups that bind to only one of the two metal ions. Some ligands binucleating ligands are symmetrical, which facilitates the formation of homobimetallic complexes. Other binucleating ligands, where the binding compartments are dissimilar, facilitate the formation of heterobimetallic complexes.

Binucleating ligands

2,4,6-Heptanetrionate dianion

Diiminocresolate

Diphosphinomethylpyrazolate

Dipyridylpyridazine.
