= Phenyl acetate =

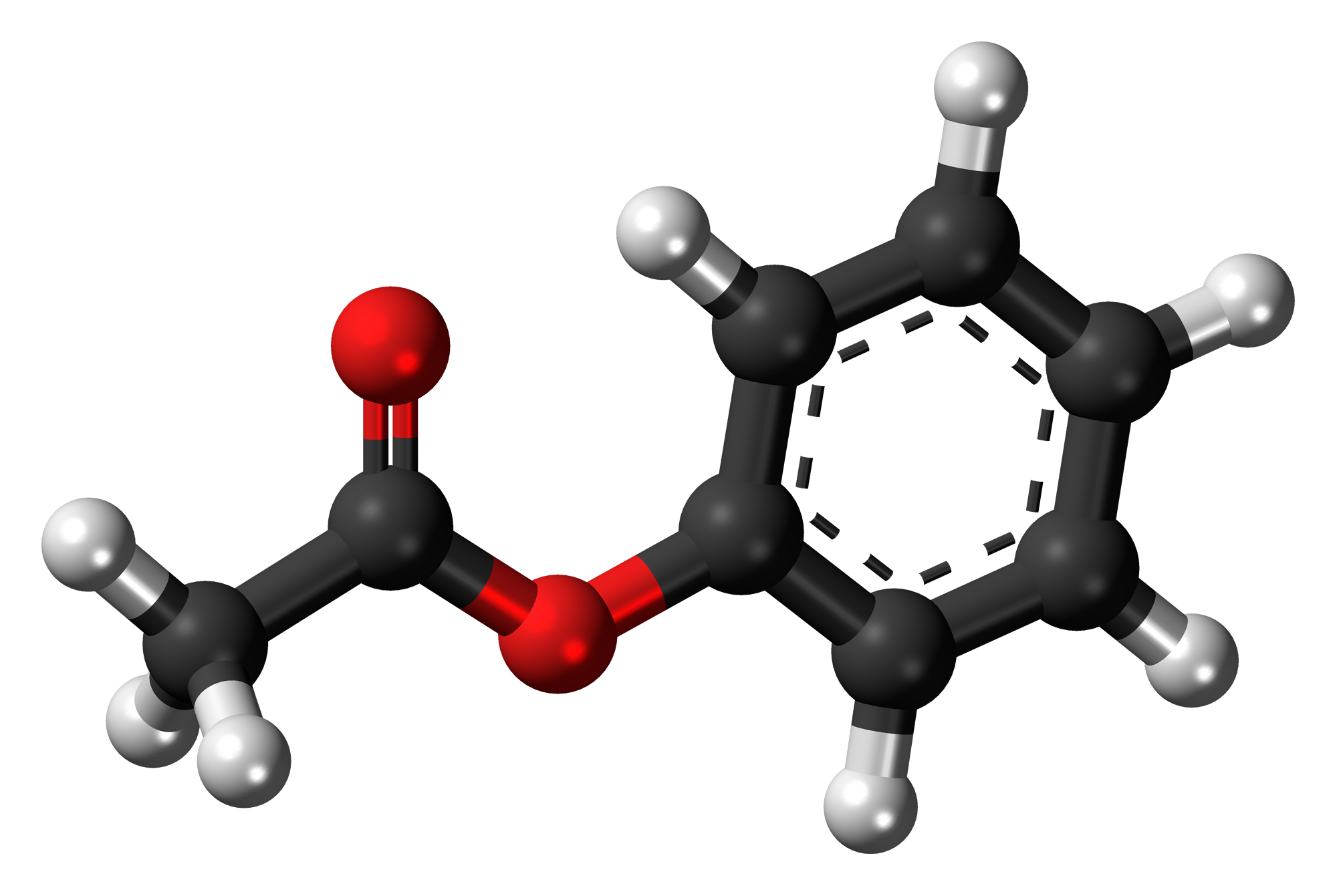

Names
- Preferred IUPAC name Phenyl acetate
- Systematic IUPAC name Phenyl ethanoate
- Other names Phenol acetate (Acetyloxy)benzene; Acetoxybenzene

Identifiers
CAS Number	122-79-2
3D model (JSmol)	Interactive image
Abbreviations	AcOPh; PhOAc
ChEBI	CHEBI:8082
ChemSpider	28969
ECHA InfoCard	100.004.160
PubChem CID	31229
UNII	355G9R500Y
CompTox Dashboard (EPA)	DTXSID3051626
- InChI: InChI=1S/C8H8O2/c1-7(9)10-8-5-3-2-4-6-8/h2-6H,1H3 Key: IPBVNPXQWQGGJP-UHFFFAOYSA-N; InChI=1/C8H8O2/c1-7(9)10-8-5-3-2-4-6-8/h2-6H,1H3 Key: IPBVNPXQWQGGJP-UHFFFAOYAF
- SMILES: CC(=O)Oc1ccccc1

Properties
Chemical formula	C_{8}H_{8}O_{2}
Molar mass	136.150 g·mol^{−1}
Appearance	Colourless liquid
Odor	Phenolic, sweetish
Density	1.075 g/mL
Melting point	−30 °C (−22 °F; 243 K)
Boiling point	195–196 °C (383–385 °F; 468–469 K)
Magnetic susceptibility (χ)	−82.04·10^{−6} cm^{3}/mol

Hazards
Flash point	76 °C (169 °F; 349 K)

Related compounds
Related compounds	Phenyl formate
- Except where otherwise noted, data are given for materials in their standard state (at 25 °C [77 °F], 100 kPa). Infobox references

Phenyl acetate is an organic compound with the chemical formula CH_{3}COOC_{6}H_{5}. It is a colorless liquid with a sweet odor. It is the ester of phenol and acetic acid. It can be produced by reacting phenol with acetic anhydride or acetyl chloride.

== Reactions ==
Phenyl acetate can be separated into phenol and an acetate salt, via saponification: heating the phenyl acetate with a strong base, such as sodium hydroxide, will produce phenol and an acetate salt (sodium acetate, if sodium hydroxide were used).

CH_{3}COOC_{6}H_{5} + NaOH → CH_{3}COO^{−}Na^{+} + C_{6}H_{5}OH
