= Akabori amino-acid reaction =

Type of amino acid reaction

There are several Akabori amino acid reactions, which are named after Shirō Akabori (Japanese: 赤堀 四郎) (1900–1992), a Japanese chemist.

In the first reaction, an α-amino acid is oxidised and undergoes decarboxylation to give an aldehyde at the former α position by heating with oxygen in the presence of a reducing sugar. This reaction is useful for preparing dichlorophthalimido derivatives of peptides for mass spectral analysis.

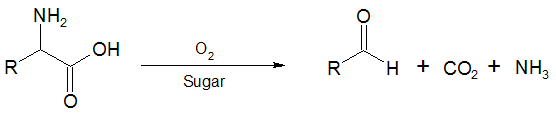

In the second reaction, an α-amino acid, or an ester of it, is reduced by sodium amalgam and ethanolic HCl to give an α-amino aldehyde. This process is conceptually similar to the Bouveault–Blanc reduction except that it stops at the aldehyde stage rather than reducing the ester all the way to two alcohols.

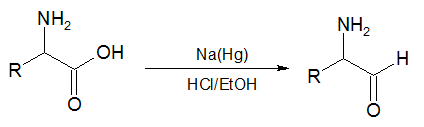

== See also ==
- Maillard reaction
