= Nickel succinate =

Identifiers
3D model (JSmol)	Interactive image; tetrahydrate: Interactive image; MIL-73: Interactive image
ChemSpider	15755079
PubChem CID	21799768; tetrahydrate: 172763695
- InChI: InChI=1S/C4H6O4.Ni/c5-3(6)1-2-4(7)8;/h1-2H2,(H,5,6)(H,7,8);/q;+2/p-2 Key: GCCOQKFJIMVKEJ-UHFFFAOYSA-L; tetrahydrate: InChI=1S/C4H6O4.Ni.4H2O/c5-3(6)1-2-4(7)8;;;;;/h1-2H2,(H,5,6)(H,7,8);;4*1H2/q;+2;;;;/p-2 Key: MALGQSMEYFLUKN-UHFFFAOYSA-L
- SMILES: C(CC(=O)[O-])C(=O)[O-].[Ni+2]; tetrahydrate: C(CC(=O)[O-])C(=O)[O-].O.O.O.O.[Ni+2]; MIL-73: C(CC(=O)[O-])C(=O)[O-].C(CC(=O)[O-])C(=O)[O-].C(CC(=O)[O-])C(=O)[O-].C(CC(=O)[O-])C(=O)[O-].O.O.O.O.O.O.O.O.O.O.[O-H].[O-H].[O-H].[O-H].[O-H].[O-H].[Ni+2].[Ni+2].[Ni+2].[Ni+2].[Ni+2].[Ni+2].[Ni+2]
- Except where otherwise noted, data are given for materials in their standard state (at 25 °C [77 °F], 100 kPa). Infobox references

Nickel succinate is a transition metal carboxylic acid salt. It crystallises in several forms. Nickel coordinates in a far more diverse way than other transition elements enabling a variety of structures for the same constituents. Succinate is dibasic, so its two ends can connect onto two different nickel atoms. Succininate is flexible, so that it can be bent to different angles and lengths. This allows formation of metal organic framework solids.

In a water solution one Ni^{2+} ion can be connected to both ends of a succinate ion to yield a neutral complex.

The neutral nickel succinate NiC_{4}H_{2}O_{4}·4H_{2}O, can be made from succinic acid and nickel carbonate. It dehydrates between 114 and 200°, Andydrous nickel succinate breaks down at 380° and over 450°C only nickel oxide is left. The gaseous decomposition products mainly consist of water, methane, ethylene, propane and carbon dioxide. Minor output included butene and pentane. The salt has two strong infrared absorption bands. One at 3220-2950 cm^{−1} due to OH and another at 1550 due to carboxylate -COO^{−}.

== Basic salts ==
One structure called MIL-73, with formula [Ni_{7}(C_{4}H_{2}O_{4})_{4}(OH)_{6}·3H_{2}O]·7H_{2}O, crystallises in the monoclinic system with a=7.8597 b=18.8154 c=23.4377 β=92.029° unit cell volume V=3463.9 Å^{3}. The structure consists of alternating layers of nickel hydroxide chains running in the b direction stacked side by side in the a direction, and succinate aligned in the c direction. Thermal decomposition resulted in stages of water loss at 45°, 60°, 110° (reversibly losing the ·7H_{2}O. More water is lost at 225° and total decomposition occurs at 280°C.

Under 20K MIL-73 is ferrimagnetic.

Another structure has formula [Ni_{7}(C_{4}H_{2}O_{4})_{6}(OH)_{2}·2H_{2}O]·2H_{2}O. It has a three dimensional honey comb structure with pores running through it. [Ni_{7}(C_{4}H_{2}O_{4})_{6}(OH)_{2}·2H_{2}O]·2H_{2}O is made by dissolving succinic acid in cyclohexanol and a nickel salt in water and then mixing. This structure has high stability. It loses water at 200 to 240°, but keeps its structure up till 380°C.
