= Folylpolyglutamate synthase =

Mammalian protein found in Homo sapiens

FPGS

Identifiers
- Aliases: FPGS, folylpolyglutamate synthase
- External IDs: OMIM: 136510; MGI: 95576; HomoloGene: 6997; GeneCards: FPGS; OMA:FPGS - orthologs

Gene location (Human)
Chr.	Chromosome 9 (human)
Band	9q34.11	Start	127,794,597 bp
Band	9q34.11	End	127,814,327 bp

Gene location (Mouse)
Chr.	Chromosome 2 (mouse)
Band	2 B|2 22.09 cM	Start	32,572,621 bp
Band	2 B|2 22.09 cM	End	32,594,157 bp
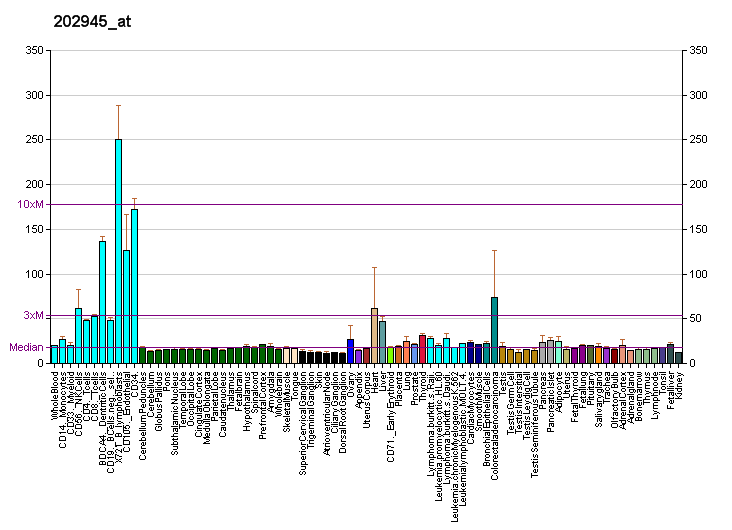
RNA expression pattern
Bgee	Human / Mouse (ortholog); Top expressed in: left ovary; right ovary; left uterine tube; gastric mucosa; left adrenal cortex; right uterine tube; right lobe of liver; right adrenal gland; right adrenal cortex; canal of the cervix / Top expressed in: left lobe of liver; zygote; secondary oocyte; right kidney; proximal tubule; primary oocyte; spermatid; tail of embryo; yolk sac; epiblast; More reference expression data
BioGPS	More reference expression data
Gene ontology
Molecular function	nucleotide binding; ligase activity; ATP binding; tetrahydrofolylpolyglutamate synthase activity; metal ion binding; dihydrofolate synthase activity
Cellular component	cytosol; membrane; mitochondrial inner membrane; cytoplasm; mitochondrion; mitochondrial matrix
Biological process	one-carbon metabolic process; biosynthesis; brain development; folic acid metabolic process; animal organ regeneration; liver development; glutamate metabolic process; cell population proliferation; nucleobase-containing compound metabolic process; folic acid-containing compound biosynthetic process; folic acid-containing compound metabolic process; tetrahydrofolylpolyglutamate biosynthetic process; dihydrofolate biosynthetic process
Sources:Amigo / QuickGO
Orthologs
Species	Human	Mouse
Entrez	2356	14287
Ensembl	ENSG00000136877	ENSMUSG00000009566
UniProt	Q05932	P48760
RefSeq (mRNA)	NM_001018078; NM_001288803; NM_004957	NM_010236
RefSeq (protein)	NP_001018088; NP_001275732; NP_004948	NP_034366
Location (UCSC)	Chr 9: 127.79 – 127.81 Mb	Chr 2: 32.57 – 32.59 Mb
PubMed search
- Wikidata
View/Edit Human	View/Edit Mouse

Folylpolyglutamate synthase, mitochondrial is an enzyme that in humans is encoded by the FPGS gene.

This gene encodes the folylpolyglutamate synthetase enzyme. This enzyme has a central role in establishing and maintaining both cytosolic and mitochondrial folylpolyglutamate concentrations and, therefore, is essential for folate homeostasis and the survival of proliferating cells. This enzyme catalyzes the ATP-dependent addition of glutamate moieties to folate and folate derivatives. While several transcript variants may exist for this gene, the full-length natures of only two have been biologically validated to date. These two variants encode distinct isoforms.

== Interactive pathway map ==
Click on genes, proteins and metabolites below to link to respective articles. (Note: The interactive pathway map can be edited at WikiPathways: "FluoropyrimidineActivity_WP1601".)

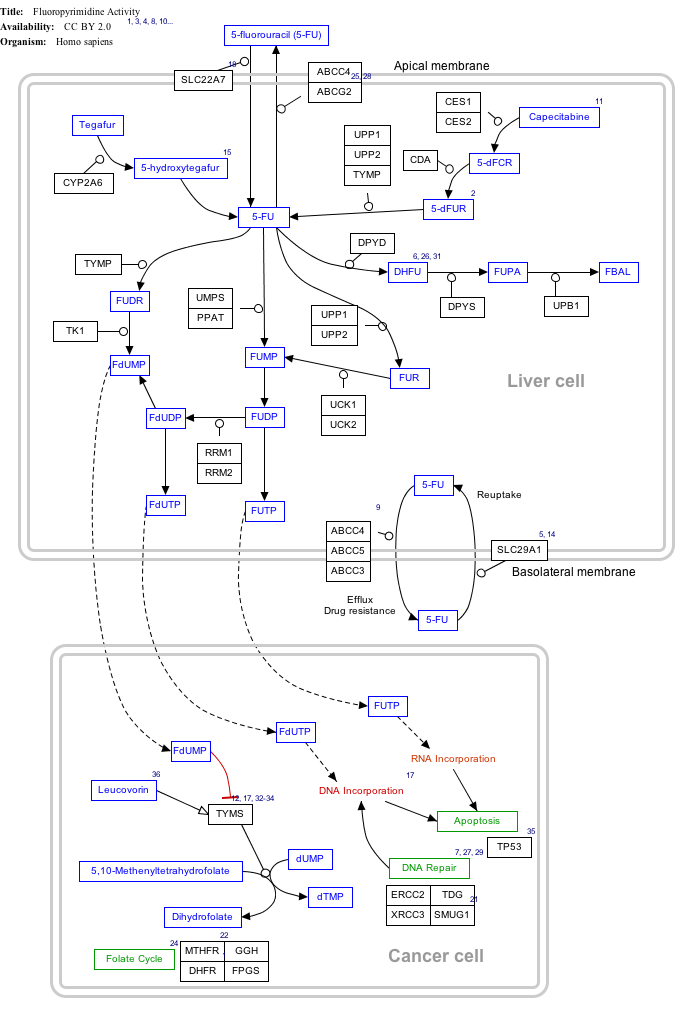

Fluorouracil (5-FU) Activity edit
