= Oxalatonickelate =

Compounds that contain nickel complexed by oxalate groups

The oxalatonickelates are a class of compounds that contain nickel complexed by oxalate groups. They form a series of double salts, and include clusters with multiple nickel atoms. Since oxalate functions as a bidentate ligand it can satisfy two coordinate positions around the nickel atom, or it can bridge two nickel atoms together.

The shape around the nickel atom is octahedral for diaquabis(oxalato)nickelate. The colour of this is green due to the Ni(–O–)_{6} chromophore. The absorption in infrared is at 8,300 9,060 13,400, 15,260, and 26,160 cm^{−1}. The ligand field parameters are 10 Dq=8800 cm^{−1} and B=1000 cm^{−1}.

formula	name	other names	structure	colour or decomposition	CAS Number	references
[(C_{2}O_{4})_{2}Ni]^{2−}	bis(oxalato)nickelate (2−)					
Li_{2}[(C_{2}O_{4})_{2}Ni]•6H_{2}O	dilithium bis(oxalato)nickelate (2−)			dehydrate 80° decompose 345°	112678-94-1	
Na_{2}[(C_{2}O_{4})_{2}Ni]•3H_{2}O	disodium bis(oxalato)nickelate (2−)			dehydrates at 85°, decompose over 320°	107996-66-5	
[NH_{4}]_{2}[(C_{2}O_{4})_{2}Ni]•3H_{2}O	diammonium bis(oxalato)nickelate (2−)			dehydrate 180-262° deaminate 262-338 °C	108559-31-5	
K_{2}[(C_{2}O_{4})_{2}Ni•2H_{2}O]•4H_{2}O	dipotassium trans-diaquabis(oxalato-O,O')nickelate(II)-water (1/4)	potassium bis oxalate nickel(II) tetrahydrate	monoclinic a=8.647 b=6.627 c=12.118 β=101.58° V=680.3 Z=2 density=2.05 / 2.04	green	14244-63-4	
Co[(C_{2}O_{4})_{2}Ni]•5H_{2}O	cobalt(II)bis(oxalato)nickelate(II)pentahydrate			light pink		
Mn[(C_{2}O_{4})_{2}Ni]•4H_{2}O	manganese(II)bis(oxalato)nickelate(II)tetrahydrate			light blue		
Cd[(C_{2}O_{4})_{2}Ni]•4H_{2}O	cadmium(II)bis(oxalato)nickelate(II)tetrahydrate			blue		

Because the Ni^{2+} ion resembles many other divalent metal ions, it can be substituted by them, or substitute for them in other oxalate compounds to form mixed oxalates where the proportions can vary continuously. For example, magnesium nickel oxalate dihydrate.
