= Casiraghi formylation =

In organic synthesis, the Casiraghi formylation is the formation of a salicylaldehyde from a phenol and paraformaldehyde. The reaction requires a strong Brønsted base and a weak Lewis acid, and gives a methanol coproduct:

(H_{2}CO)_{2n} + nB + nLA + nHArOH → nHC(=O)ArOH + n[HB][LA:OMe]

Formally, it combines the Cannizzaro disproportionation with a directed Friedel-Crafts acylation.

In Casiraghi's original 1978 formulation, Grignard reagents served as both the hindered base and Lewis acid.

When using MgCl_{2} with a nitrogen base, such as triethylamine, the reaction is also known as Casnati-Skattebøl formylation

Applications include the synthesis of tocopherol derivatives.
