= Octadecanal =

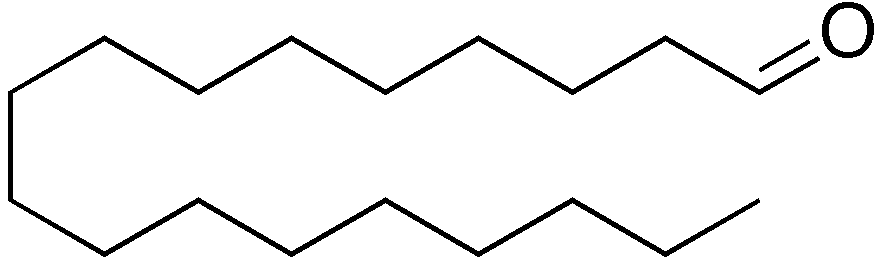

Names
- Preferred IUPAC name Octadecanal
- Other names Octadecanaldehyde; n-Octadecanal; Octodecane aldehyde; Octodecyl aldehyde; Stearyl aldehyde; Stearaldehyde

Identifiers
CAS Number	638-66-4
3D model (JSmol)	Interactive image
ChemSpider	12016
ECHA InfoCard	100.010.316
EC Number	211-346-9
PubChem CID	12533
UNII	PH4GZ7JT4C
CompTox Dashboard (EPA)	DTXSID60213250
- InChI: InChI=1S/C18H36O/c1-2-3-4-5-6-7-8-9-10-11-12-13-14-15-16-17-18-19/h18H,2-17H2,1H3 Key: FWWQKRXKHIRPJY-UHFFFAOYSA-N; InChI=1/C18H36O/c1-2-3-4-5-6-7-8-9-10-11-12-13-14-15-16-17-18-19/h18H,2-17H2,1H3 Key: FWWQKRXKHIRPJY-UHFFFAOYAM
- SMILES: CCCCCCCCCCCCCCCCCC=O

Properties
Chemical formula	C_{18}H_{36}O
Molar mass	268.485 g·mol^{−1}
Density	0.831 g/cm^{3}, liquid
Melting point	38 °C (100 °F; 311 K)
Boiling point	320 °C (608 °F; 593 K)
Solubility in water	insoluble
- Except where otherwise noted, data are given for materials in their standard state (at 25 °C [77 °F], 100 kPa). verify (what is ?) Infobox references

Octodecanal is a long-chain aldehyde, with the chemical formula C_{18}H_{36}O (also known as stearyl aldehyde). Octadecanal is used by several species of insect as a pheromone.
