= Louis Bouveault =

French chemist

- Born: 11 February 1864; Nevers, France
- Died: 5 September 1909 (aged 45)
- Occupation: Chemist

Louis Bouveault (11 February 1864 – 5 September 1909) was a French scientist who became professor of organic chemistry at the Faculty of Sciences of the University of Paris. He is known for the Bouveault aldehyde synthesis and the Bouveault–Blanc reduction.

== Life ==
Louis Bouveault was born on 11 February 1864 in Nevers. He obtained doctorates in Paris in medicine and physical sciences. Bouveault defended his thesis on β-keto nitriles and their derivatives in Paris in 1890. He taught for a short period at the Medical Faculty in Lyon, then became a lecturer in general chemistry in Lyon. He influenced Victor Grignard to take up chemistry in 1894. In Lyon he investigated syntheses with camphor and terpenes.

Bouveault moved on from Lyon to Lille, Nancy and finally to Paris. He was appointed professor of organic chemistry at the Faculty of Sciences of the University of Paris.

In 1903 Bouveault and Gustave Louis Blanc described the Bouveault–Blanc reduction for reduction of esters to the corresponding alcohols in an alcoholic solvent.

In 1904 he described the Bouveault aldehyde synthesis, a formylation of an alkyl or aryl halide to the homologous aldehyde or carbaldehyde.

In 1907 he was elected president of the French Chemical Society. He died on 5 September 1909.

== Publications ==
Bouveault was a prolific author, who published many papers in his short career. Two longer works:

- Bouveault, Louis (1890), Thèses présentées à la Faculté des sciences de Paris pour obtenir le grade de docteur ès-sciences physiques, par M. L. Bouveault,... Sur les Nitrites Bêta cétoniques et leurs dérivés, Blois: Grande Imprimerie, p. 94
- Bouveault, Louis (1892), Etudes chimiques de la bacille de la tuberculose aviaire, Paris: Henri Jouve

== Sources ==
- Li, Jie Jack (30 January 2014), Name Reactions: A Collection of Detailed Mechanisms and Synthetic Applications Fifth Edition, Springer Science & Business Media, ISBN 978-3-319-03979-4
- "Louis Bouveault (1864-1909)" (in French). BnF.
- Nye, Mary Jo (1986), Science in the Provinces: Scientific Communities and Provincial Leadership in France, 1860-1930, University of California Press, ISBN 978-0-520-05561-2
- Surrey, Alexander R. (22 October 2013), Name Reactions in Organic Chemistry, Elsevier, ISBN 978-1-4832-5868-3
