= Nickel formate =

Names
- IUPAC name nickel(2+) diformate
- Systematic IUPAC name nickel formate
- Other names nickel diformate

Identifiers
CAS Number	3349-06-2; 15694-70-9 (Dihydrate); 15843-02-4
3D model (JSmol)	Interactive image
ChemSpider	25597; 35294216
ECHA InfoCard	100.020.093
EC Number	222-101-0, 239-946-6
PubChem CID	27506
UNII	Y4YT27N8QN
UN number	3077
CompTox Dashboard (EPA)	DTXSID40890523
- InChI: InChI=1S/2CH2O2.Ni/c2*2-1-3;/h2*1H,(H,2,3);/q;;+2/p-2 Key: HZPNKQREYVVATQ-UHFFFAOYSA-L
- SMILES: C(=O)[O-].C(=O)[O-].[Ni+2]

Properties
Chemical formula	C_{2}H_{2}NiO_{4}
Molar mass	148.73
Appearance	Green Solid
Odor	odourless
Density	2.154 g/cm^{3}
Melting point	130–140°C
Boiling point	180–200°C (decomposition)
Solubility in water	Slightly soluble in cold water
Solubility	insoluble in organic solvents soluble in acids

Structure
Crystal structure	monoclinic

Hazards
- GHS labelling
Pictograms	(GHS08: Health hazard) (GHS07: Exclamation mark) (GHS09: Environmental hazard)
Signal word	Danger
Hazard statements	H317, H334, H341, H350i, H360D, H372, H410
Precautionary statements	P260, P285, P302+P352, P321, P405, P501
- Except where otherwise noted, data are given for materials in their standard state (at 25 °C [77 °F], 100 kPa). Infobox references

Nickel formate is the nickel salt of formic acid with the chemical formula Ni(HCOO)_{2}.

== Synthesis and structure ==
Nickel formate can be obtained by reacting nickel(II) acetate or nickel(II) hydroxide with formic acid.

Ni(OH)_{2} + 2HCOOH → Ni(HCOO)_{2} + 2 H_{2}O

Nickel formate can also be synthesized by the reaction of sodium formate with nickel (II) sulphate.

== Characteristics ==
As a dihydrate, nickel formate is a green, odorless, non-flammable solid that is sparingly soluble in water. The compound has a monoclinic crystal structure. The anhydride forms on careful heating at 130–140 °C. When heated in a vacuum to 300 °C, pure nickel is formed:

Ni(HCO_{2})_{2}(H_{2}O)_{2} → Ni + 2 CO_{2} + 2 H_{2}O + H_{2}

Such fine powders are useful as hydrogenation catalysts.

== Use ==
Nickel formate is used in the production of nickel and other nickel compounds such as nickel catalysts.
