= Bodroux–Chichibabin aldehyde synthesis =

Chemical reaction

The Bodroux–Chichibabin aldehyde synthesis is a chemical reaction whereby a Grignard reagent is converted to an aldehyde one carbon longer.

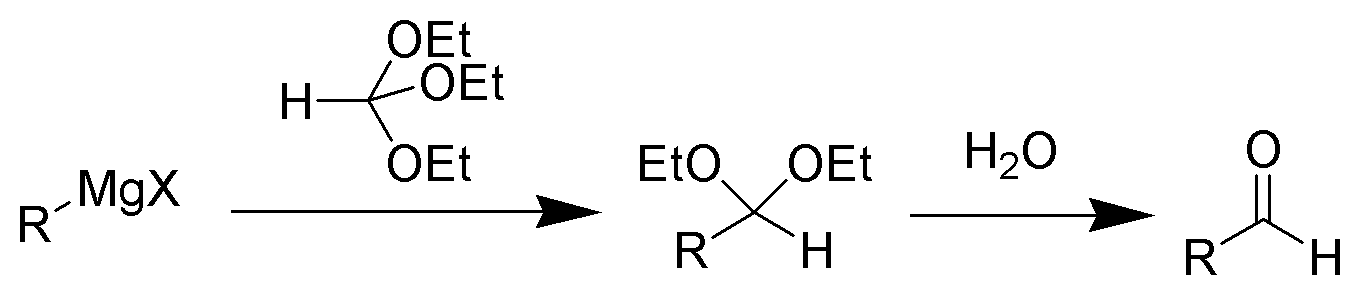

Reaction of a Grignard reagent with triethyl orthoformate gives an acetal, which can be hydrolyzed to an aldehyde. For example, the synthesis of n-hexanal:

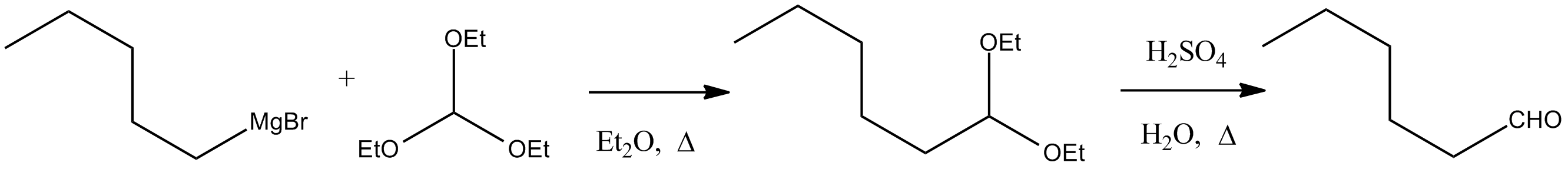
Bodroux–Chichibabin hexanal

== See also ==
- Bouveault aldehyde synthesis
