= Dichloromethyl methyl ether =

Names
- Preferred IUPAC name Dichloro(methoxy)methane

Identifiers
CAS Number	4885-02-3
3D model (JSmol)	Interactive image
ChemSpider	19757
ECHA InfoCard	100.023.180
PubChem CID	21004
UNII	M68H5X8887
CompTox Dashboard (EPA)	DTXSID2063636
- InChI: InChI=1S/C2H4Cl2O/c1-5-2(3)4/h2H,1H3
- SMILES: ClC(Cl)OC

Properties
Chemical formula	C_{2}H_{4}Cl_{2}O
Molar mass	114.95 g·mol^{−1}
Boiling point	85°C
- Except where otherwise noted, data are given for materials in their standard state (at 25 °C [77 °F], 100 kPa). Infobox references

Dichloromethyl methyl ether (HCl_{2}COCH_{3}) is an organic compound that belongs to the class of ethers with a dichloromethyl group and a methyl group. It can be synthesized from methyl formate and a mixture of phosphorus pentachloride and phosphorus oxychloride or by chlorination of chlorodimethyl ether.

The compound is used in the formylation of aromatic compounds (Rieche formylation) and as a chlorination agent in the formation of acid chlorides.
