= Oleyl alcohol =

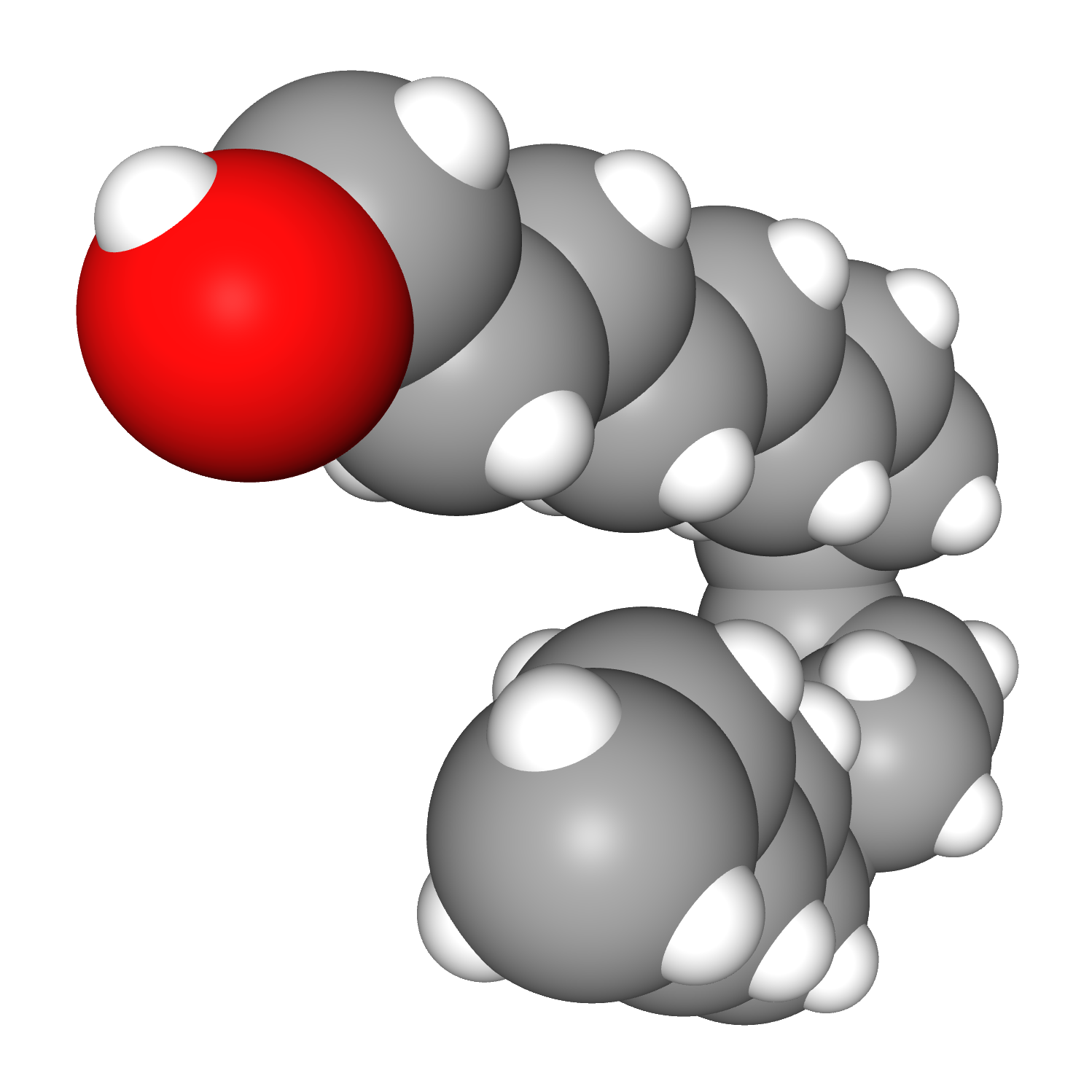

Names
- IUPAC name (Z)-Octadec-9-en-1-ol
- Other names cis-9-Octadecen-1-ol

Identifiers
CAS Number	143-28-2
3D model (JSmol)	Interactive image
ChEBI	CHEBI:73504
ChemSpider	4447562
ECHA InfoCard	100.005.089
KEGG	D05245
PubChem CID	5284499
UNII	172F2WN8DV
CompTox Dashboard (EPA)	DTXSID0022010
- InChI: InChI=1S/C18H36O/c1-2-3-4-5-6-7-8-9-10-11-12-13-14-15-16-17-18-19/h9-10,19H,2-8,11-18H2,1H3/b10-9- Key: ALSTYHKOOCGGFT-KTKRTIGZSA-N; InChI=1/C18H36O/c1-2-3-4-5-6-7-8-9-10-11-12-13-14-15-16-17-18-19/h9-10,19H,2-8,11-18H2,1H3/b10-9- Key: ALSTYHKOOCGGFT-KTKRTIGZBF
- SMILES: OCCCCCCCC\C=C/CCCCCCCC

Properties
Chemical formula	C_{18}H_{36}O
Molar mass	268.485 g·mol^{−1}
Density	0.845-0.855 g/cm^{3}
Melting point	13 to 19 °C (55 to 66 °F; 286 to 292 K)
Boiling point	330 to 360 °C (626 to 680 °F; 603 to 633 K)
Solubility in water	Insoluble

Hazards
NFPA 704 (fire diamond)	1 0 0
- Except where otherwise noted, data are given for materials in their standard state (at 25 °C [77 °F], 100 kPa). verify (what is ?) Infobox references

Oleyl alcohol /ˈoʊliˌɪl, ˈoʊliəl/, or cis-9-octadecen-1-ol, is an unsaturated fatty alcohol with the molecular formula C_{18}H_{36}O or the condensed structural formula CH_{3}(CH_{2})_{7}−CH=CH−(CH_{2})_{8}OH. It is a colorless oil, mainly used in cosmetics.

It can be produced by the hydrogenation of oleic acid esters by Bouveault–Blanc reduction, which avoids reduction of the C=C group (as would occur with usual catalytic hydrogenation). The required oleate esters are obtained from beef fat, fish oil, and, in particular, olive oil (from which it gains its name). The original procedure was reported by Louis Bouveault in 1904 and subsequently refined.

It has uses as a nonionic surfactant, emulsifier, emollient and thickener in skin creams, lotions and many other cosmetic products including shampoos and hair conditioners. It has also been investigated as a carrier for delivering medications through the skin or mucous membranes; particularly the lungs.

== See also ==
- Oleic acid - the corresponding fatty acid
- Oleylamine - the corresponding amine
- Oleamide - the corresponding amide
