= Acetylcholine =

Organic chemical and neurotransmitter

Clinical data
- Other names: ACh
- License data: US DailyMed: Acetylcholine
- ATC code: S01EB09 (WHO)

Physiological data
- Source tissues: motor neurons, parasympathetic nervous system, brain
- Target tissues: smooth muscles, brain, many other organs
- Receptors: nicotinic, muscarinic
- Agonists: nicotine, muscarine, cholinesterase inhibitors
- Antagonists: tubocurarine, atropine
- Precursor: choline, acetyl-CoA
- Biosynthesis: choline acetyltransferase
- Metabolism: acetylcholinesterase

Identifiers
- IUPAC name: 2-Acetoxy-N,N,N-trimethylethanaminium
- CAS Number: 51-84-3
- PubChem CID: 187
- IUPHAR/BPS: 294
- DrugBank: EXPT00412
- ChemSpider: 182
- UNII: N9YNS0M02X
- KEGG: C01996
- ChEBI: CHEBI:15355
- ChEMBL: ChEMBL667
- E number: E1001(i) (additional chemicals)
- CompTox Dashboard (EPA): DTXSID8075334
- ECHA InfoCard: 100.000.118

Chemical and physical data
- Formula: C_{7}H_{16}NO_{2}
- Molar mass: 146.210 g·mol^{−1}

Acetylcholine (ACh) is an organic compound that functions in the brain and body of many types of animals (including humans) as a neurotransmitter. Its name is derived from its chemical structure: it is an ester of acetic acid and choline. Parts in the body that use or are affected by acetylcholine are referred to as cholinergic.

Acetylcholine is the neurotransmitter used at the neuromuscular junction. In other words, it is the chemical that motor neurons of the nervous system release in order to activate muscles. This property means that drugs that affect cholinergic systems can have very dangerous effects ranging from paralysis to convulsions. Acetylcholine is also a neurotransmitter in the autonomic nervous system, both as an internal transmitter for both the sympathetic and the parasympathetic nervous system, and as the final product released by the parasympathetic nervous system. Acetylcholine is the primary neurotransmitter of the parasympathetic nervous system, where cholinergic neurons mediate its "rest and digest" function.

In the brain, acetylcholine functions as a neurotransmitter and as a neuromodulator. The brain contains a number of cholinergic areas, each with distinct functions; such as playing an important role in arousal, attention, memory and motivation. Acetylcholine has also been found in cells of non-neural origins as well as microbes. Recently, enzymes related to its synthesis, degradation and cellular uptake have been traced back to early origins of unicellular eukaryotes. The protist pathogens Acanthamoeba spp. have shown evidence of the presence of ACh, which provides growth and proliferative signals via a membrane-located M_{1}-muscarinic receptor homolog.

Partly because of acetylcholine's muscle-activating function, but also because of its functions in the autonomic nervous system and brain, many important drugs exert their effects by altering cholinergic transmission. Numerous venoms and toxins produced by plants, animals, and bacteria, as well as chemical nerve agents such as sarin, cause harm by inactivating or hyperactivating muscles through their influences on the neuromuscular junction. Drugs that act on muscarinic acetylcholine receptors, such as atropine, can be poisonous in large quantities, but in smaller doses they are commonly used to treat certain heart conditions and eye problems. Scopolamine, or diphenhydramine, which also act mainly on muscarinic receptors in an inhibitory fashion in the brain (especially the M_{1} receptor) can cause delirium, hallucinations, and amnesia through receptor antagonism at these sites. So far as of 2016, only the M_{1} receptor subtype has been implicated in anticholinergic delirium. The addictive qualities of nicotine are derived from its effects on nicotinic acetylcholine receptors in the brain.

== Chemistry ==
Acetylcholine is a choline molecule that has been acetylated at the oxygen atom. Because of the charged ammonium group, acetylcholine does not penetrate lipid membranes. Because of this, when the molecule is introduced externally, it remains in the extracellular space and at present it is considered that the molecule does not pass through the blood–brain barrier.

== Biochemistry ==
Acetylcholine is synthesized in certain neurons by the enzyme choline acetyltransferase from the compounds choline and acetyl-CoA. Cholinergic neurons are capable of producing ACh. An example of a central cholinergic area is the nucleus basalis of Meynert in the basal forebrain. The enzyme acetylcholinesterase converts acetylcholine into the inactive metabolites choline and acetate. This enzyme is abundant in the synaptic cleft, and its role in rapidly clearing free acetylcholine from the synapse is essential for proper muscle function. Certain neurotoxins work by inhibiting acetylcholinesterase, thus leading to excess acetylcholine at the neuromuscular junction, which results in hyperstimulation of muscarinic and nicotinic receptors, causing paralysis of the muscles needed for breathing and stopping the beating of the heart.

== Functions ==
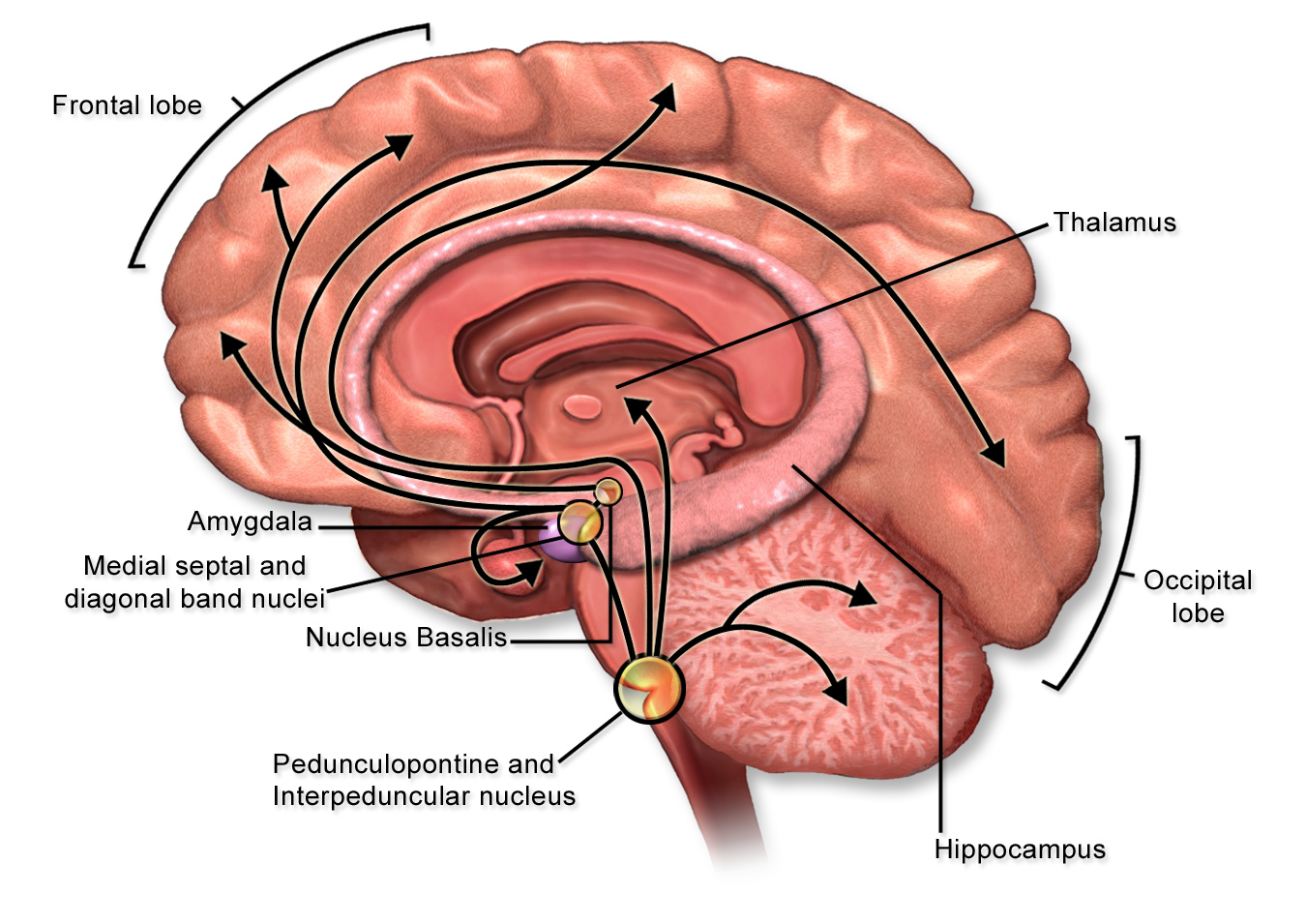
Acetylcholine pathway.

Acetylcholine functions in both the central nervous system (CNS) and the peripheral nervous system (PNS). In the CNS, cholinergic projections from the basal forebrain to the cerebral cortex and hippocampus support the cognitive functions of those target areas. In the PNS, acetylcholine activates muscles and is a major neurotransmitter in the autonomic nervous system.

=== Cellular effects ===
Acetylcholine processing in a synapse. After release acetylcholine is broken down by the enzyme acetylcholinesterase.

Like many other biologically active substances, acetylcholine exerts its effects by binding to and activating receptors located on the surface of cells. There are two main classes of acetylcholine receptor, nicotinic and muscarinic. They are named for chemicals that can selectively activate each type of receptor without activating the other: muscarine is a compound found in the mushroom Amanita muscaria; nicotine is found in tobacco.

Nicotinic acetylcholine receptors are ligand-gated ion channels permeable to sodium, potassium, and calcium ions. In other words, they are ion channels embedded in cell membranes, capable of switching from a closed to an open state when acetylcholine binds to them; in the open state they allow ions to pass through. Nicotinic receptors come in two main types, known as muscle-type and neuronal-type. The muscle-type can be selectively blocked by curare, the neuronal-type by hexamethonium. The main location of muscle-type receptors is on muscle cells, as described in more detail below. Neuronal-type receptors are located in autonomic ganglia (both sympathetic and parasympathetic), and in the central nervous system.

Muscarinic acetylcholine receptors have a more complex mechanism, and affect target cells over a longer time frame. In mammals, five subtypes of muscarinic receptors have been identified, labeled M1 through M5. All of them function as G protein-coupled receptors, meaning that they exert their effects via a second messenger system. The M1, M3, and M5 subtypes are G_{q}-coupled; they increase intracellular levels of IP_{3} and calcium by activating phospholipase C. Their effect on target cells is usually excitatory. The M2 and M4 subtypes are G_{i}/G_{o}-coupled; they decrease intracellular levels of cAMP by inhibiting adenylate cyclase. Their effect on target cells is usually inhibitory. Muscarinic acetylcholine receptors are found in both the central nervous system and the peripheral nervous system of the heart, lungs, upper gastrointestinal tract, and sweat glands.

=== Neuromuscular junction ===
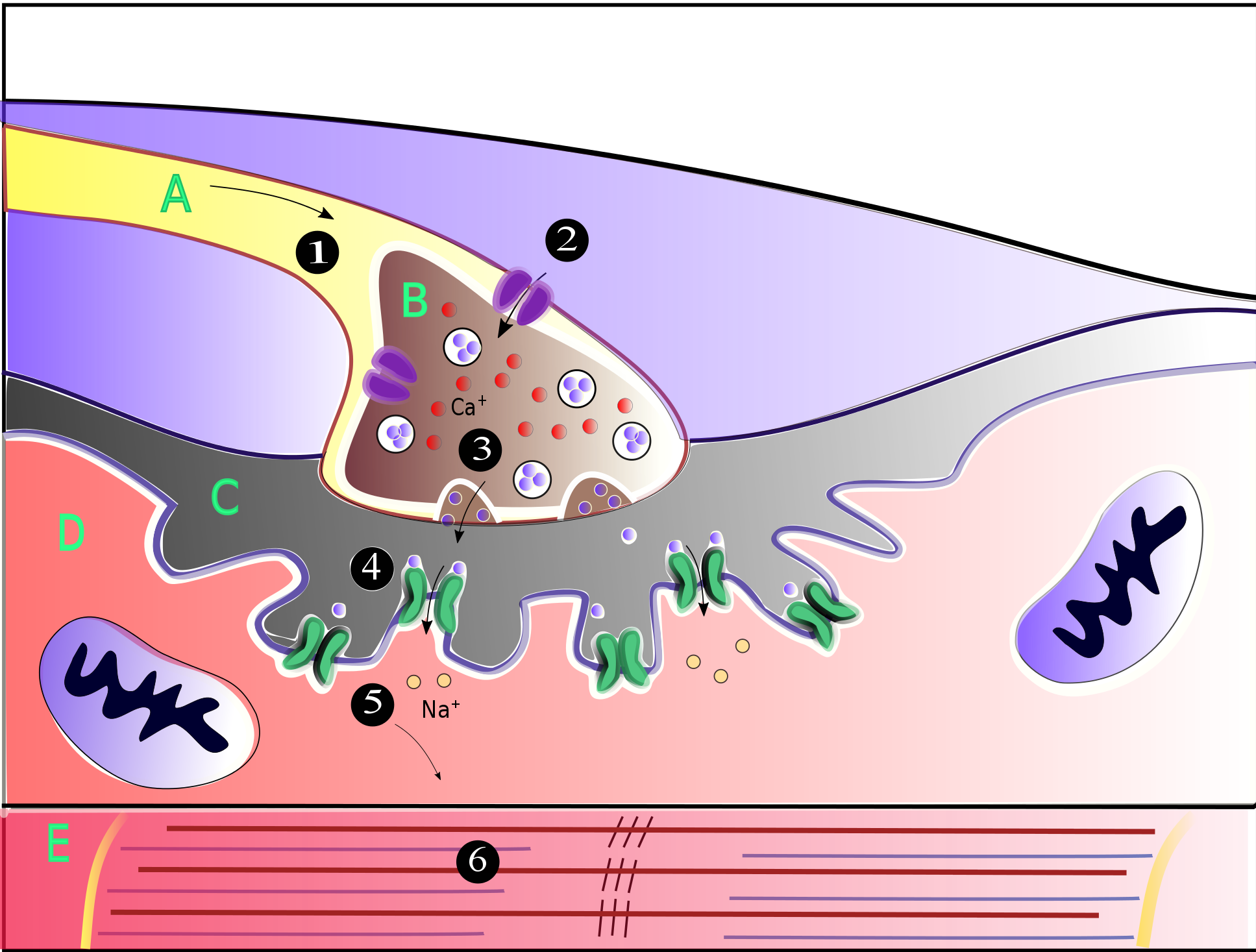
Muscles contract when they receive signals from motor neurons. The neuromuscular junction is the site of the signal exchange. The steps of this process in vertebrates occur as follows: (1) The action potential reaches the axon terminal. (2) Calcium ions flow into the axon terminal. (3) Acetylcholine is released into the synaptic cleft. (4) Acetylcholine binds to postsynaptic receptors. (5) This binding causes ion channels to open and allows sodium ions to flow into the muscle cell. (6) The flow of sodium ions across the membrane into the muscle cell generates an action potential which induces muscle contraction. Labels: A: Motor neuron axon B: Axon terminal C: Synaptic cleft D: Muscle cell E: Part of a Myofibril

Acetylcholine is the substance the nervous system uses to activate skeletal muscles, a kind of striated muscle. These are the muscles used for all types of voluntary movement, in contrast to smooth muscle tissue, which is involved in a range of involuntary activities such as movement of food through the gastrointestinal tract and constriction of blood vessels. Skeletal muscles are directly controlled by motor neurons located in the spinal cord or, in a few cases, the brainstem. These motor neurons send their axons through motor nerves, from which they emerge to connect to muscle fibers at a special type of synapse called the neuromuscular junction.

When a motor neuron generates an action potential, it travels rapidly along the nerve until it reaches the neuromuscular junction, where it initiates an electrochemical process that causes acetylcholine to be released into the space between the presynaptic terminal and the muscle fiber. The acetylcholine molecules then bind to nicotinic ion-channel receptors on the muscle cell membrane, causing the ion channels to open. Sodium ions then flow into the muscle cell, initiating a sequence of steps that finally produce muscle contraction.

Factors that decrease release of acetylcholine (and thereby affecting P-type calcium channels):

1. Antibiotics (clindamycin, polymyxin)
2. Magnesium: antagonizes P-type calcium channels
3. Hypocalcemia
4. Anticonvulsants
5. Diuretics (furosemide)
6. Eaton-Lambert syndrome: inhibits P-type calcium channels
7. Myasthenia gravis
8. Botulinum toxin: inhibits SNARE proteins

Calcium channel blockers (nifedipine, diltiazem) do not affect P-channels. These drugs affect L-type calcium channels.

=== Autonomic nervous system ===
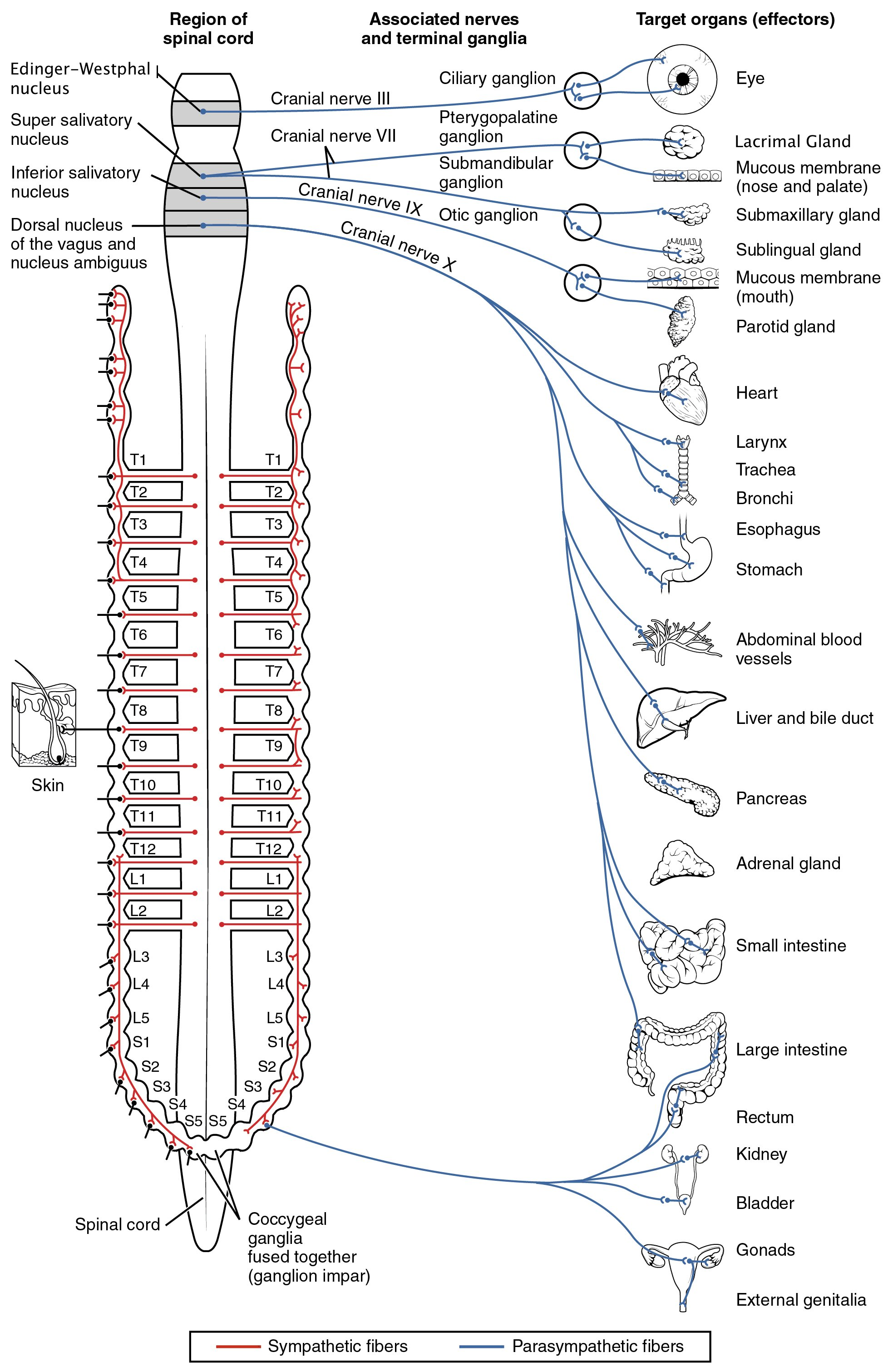
Components and connections of the parasympathetic nervous system.

The autonomic nervous system controls a wide range of involuntary and unconscious body functions. Its main branches are the sympathetic nervous system and parasympathetic nervous system. Broadly speaking, the function of the sympathetic nervous system is to mobilize the body for action; the phrase often invoked to describe it is fight-or-flight. The function of the parasympathetic nervous system is to put the body in a state conducive to rest, regeneration, digestion, and reproduction; the phrase often invoked to describe it is "rest and digest" or "feed and breed". Both of these aforementioned systems use acetylcholine, but in different ways.

At a schematic level, the sympathetic and parasympathetic nervous systems are both organized in essentially the same way: preganglionic neurons in the central nervous system send projections to neurons located in autonomic ganglia, which send output projections to virtually every tissue of the body. In both branches the internal connections, the projections from the central nervous system to the autonomic ganglia, use acetylcholine as a neurotransmitter to innervate (or excite) ganglia neurons. In the parasympathetic nervous system the output connections, the projections from ganglion neurons to tissues that do not belong to the nervous system, also release acetylcholine but act on muscarinic receptors. In the sympathetic nervous system the output connections mainly release noradrenaline, although acetylcholine is released at a few points, such as the sudomotor innervation of the sweat glands.

==== Direct vascular effects ====
Acetylcholine in the serum exerts a direct effect on vascular tone by binding to muscarinic receptors present on vascular endothelium. These cells respond by increasing production of nitric oxide, which signals the surrounding smooth muscle to relax, leading to vasodilation.

=== Central nervous system ===
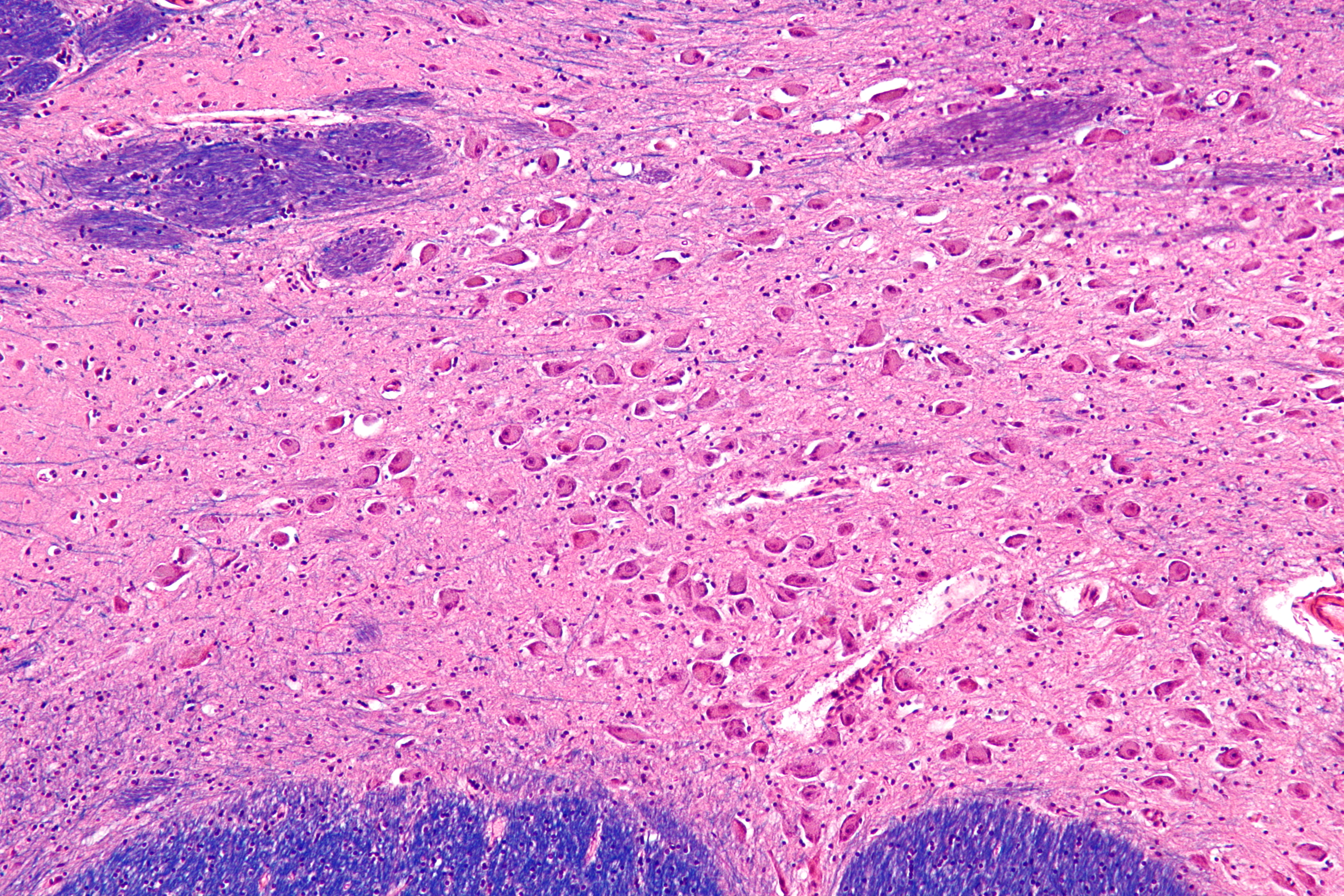
Micrograph of the nucleus basalis (of Meynert), which produces acetylcholine in the CNS. LFB-HE stain.

In the central nervous system, ACh has a variety of effects on plasticity, arousal and reward. ACh has an important role in the enhancement of alertness when we wake up, in sustaining attention and in learning and memory.

Damage to the cholinergic (acetylcholine-producing) system in the brain has been shown to be associated with the memory deficits associated with Alzheimer's disease. ACh has also been shown to promote REM sleep.

In the brainstem acetylcholine originates from the Pedunculopontine nucleus and laterodorsal tegmental nucleus collectively known as the mesopontine tegmentum area or pontomesencephalotegmental complex. In the basal forebrain, it originates from the basal nucleus of Meynert and medial septal nucleus:

- The pontomesencephalotegmental complex acts mainly on M1 receptors in the brainstem, deep cerebellar nuclei, pontine nuclei, locus coeruleus, raphe nucleus, lateral reticular nucleus and inferior olive. It also projects to the thalamus, tectum, basal ganglia and basal forebrain.
- Basal nucleus of Meynert acts mainly on M1 receptors in the neocortex.
- Medial septal nucleus acts mainly on M1 receptors in the hippocampus and parts of the cerebral cortex.

In addition, ACh acts as an important internal transmitter in the striatum, which is part of the basal ganglia. It is released by cholinergic interneurons. In humans, non-human primates and rodents, these interneurons respond to salient environmental stimuli with responses that are temporally aligned with the responses of dopaminergic neurons of the substantia nigra.

==== Memory ====
Acetylcholine has been implicated in learning and memory in several ways. The anticholinergic drug scopolamine impairs acquisition of new information in humans and animals. In animals, disruption of the supply of acetylcholine to the neocortex impairs the learning of simple discrimination tasks, comparable to the acquisition of factual information and disruption of the supply of acetylcholine to the hippocampus and adjacent cortical areas produces forgetfulness, comparable to anterograde amnesia in humans.

Acetylcholine (ACh) has traditionally been seen as vital for learning and memory, but recent studies question its purely positive role. Too much ACh can interfere with memory consolidation, particularly during sleep, and may worsen verbal memory in early Alzheimer’s disease (AD) and mild cognitive impairment (MCI). Excessive activation of ACh pathways can also overstimulate glutamate activity, contributing to AD progression. Researchers propose that ACh levels first increase and later decrease throughout AD and Parkinson’s disease dementia (PDD), due to initial overstimulation followed by neuron loss. They emphasize that cholinesterase inhibitors may not help all cognitive symptoms and could disrupt natural ACh balance, showing that ACh’s effects on memory are complex and require further investigation.

== Diseases and disorders ==
=== Myasthenia gravis ===
The disease myasthenia gravis, characterized by muscle weakness and fatigue, occurs when the body inappropriately produces antibodies against acetylcholine nicotinic receptors, and thus inhibits proper acetylcholine signal transmission. Over time, the motor end plate is destroyed. Drugs that competitively inhibit acetylcholinesterase (e.g., neostigmine, physostigmine, or primarily pyridostigmine) are effective in treating the symptoms of this disorder. They allow endogenously released acetylcholine more time to interact with its respective receptor before being inactivated by acetylcholinesterase in the synaptic cleft (the space between nerve and muscle).

Nerves release ACh at the neuromuscular junction. ACh binds to ACh receptors on the muscle surface and causes muscle contraction. Then the immune system produces autoantibodies that attack or black the ACh receptors on the muscle. Therefore, the signal from the nerve to the muscle is weakened or lost. Juvenile MG is more frequently seen in people of Asian and African descent.

== Pharmacology ==
Blocking, hindering or mimicking the action of acetylcholine has many uses in medicine. Drugs acting on the acetylcholine system are either agonists to the receptors, stimulating the system, or antagonists, inhibiting it. Acetylcholine receptor agonists and antagonists can either have an effect directly on the receptors or exert their effects indirectly, e.g., by affecting the enzyme acetylcholinesterase, which degrades the receptor ligand. Agonists increase the level of receptor activation; antagonists reduce it.

Acetylcholine itself does not have therapeutic value as a drug for intravenous administration because of its multi-faceted action (non-selective) and rapid inactivation by cholinesterase. However, it is used in the form of eye drops to cause constriction of the pupil during cataract surgery, which facilitates quick post-operational recovery.

=== Nicotinic receptors ===
Nicotine binds to and activates nicotinic acetylcholine receptors, mimicking the effect of acetylcholine at these receptors. ACh opens a Na^{+} channel upon binding so that Na^{+} flows into the cell. This causes a depolarization, and results in an excitatory post-synaptic potential. Thus, ACh is excitatory on skeletal muscle; the electrical response is fast and short-lived. Curares are arrow poisons, which act at nicotinic receptors and have been used to develop clinically useful therapies.

=== Muscarinic receptors ===
Muscarinic receptors form G protein-coupled receptor complexes in the cell membranes of neurons and other cells. Atropine is a non-selective competitive antagonist with Acetylcholine at muscarinic receptors.

=== Cholinesterase inhibitors ===
Many ACh receptor agonists work indirectly by inhibiting the enzyme acetylcholinesterase. The resulting accumulation of acetylcholine causes continuous stimulation of the muscles, glands, and central nervous system, which can result in fatal convulsions if the dose is high. Other symptoms of a cholinergic crisis include Salivation, Lacrimation, Urinary frequency, Diarrhea, Gastrointestinal cramping and pain, Emesis, and Miosis, which create the mnemonic "SLUDGEM" and outline the muscarinic effects of Acetylcholine.

Cholinergic crises display the danger of chemical xenobiotics, which are examples of enzyme inhibitors and increase the action of acetylcholine by delaying its degradation; some have been used as nerve agents (Sarin, Tabun, Soman, and VX nerve gas), insecticides, or pesticides (organophosphates and the carbamates). Many toxins and venoms produced by plants and animals also contain cholinesterase inhibitors. In clinical use, they are administered in low doses to reverse the action of muscle relaxants, to treat myasthenia gravis, and to treat symptoms of Alzheimer's disease (rivastigmine, which increases cholinergic activity in the brain).

=== Synthesis inhibitors ===
Organic mercurial compounds, such as methylmercury, have a high affinity for sulfhydryl groups, which causes dysfunction of the enzyme choline acetyltransferase. This inhibition may lead to acetylcholine deficiency, and can have consequences on motor function.

=== Release inhibitors ===
Botulinum toxin (Botox) acts by suppressing the release of acetylcholine, whereas the venom from a black widow spider (alpha-latrotoxin) has the reverse effect. ACh inhibition causes paralysis. When bitten by a black widow spider, one experiences the wastage of ACh supplies and the muscles begin to contract. If and when the supply is depleted, paralysis occurs.

=== Photopharmacological agents ===
Photopharmacology is an emerging field that uses light to control the activity of biologically active compounds with high spatial and temporal precision. Recent advances have applied this approach to the cholinergic system, including photoactivatable agonists and antagonists of muscarinic and nicotinic acetylcholine receptors, as well as light-sensitive acetylcholinesterase inhibitors, that enable reversible and targeted modulation of cholinergic signaling upon irradiation. These light-regulated compounds, based on either photolabile protecting groups ("caged" ligands) or photoisomerizable scaffolds, offer unprecedented control over acetylcholine-mediated processes and represent promising tools for both basic research and potential therapeutic applications.

== Comparative biology and evolution ==
Acetylcholine is used by organisms in all domains of life for a variety of purposes. It is believed that choline, a precursor to acetylcholine, was used by single celled organisms billions of years ago for synthesizing cell membrane phospholipids. Following the evolution of choline transporters, the abundance of intracellular choline paved the way for choline to become incorporated into other synthetic pathways, including acetylcholine production. Acetylcholine is used by bacteria, fungi, and a variety of other animals. Many of the uses of acetylcholine rely on its action on ion channels via GPCRs like membrane proteins.

The two major types of acetylcholine receptors, muscarinic and nicotinic receptors, have convergently evolved to be responsive to acetylcholine. This means that rather than having evolved from a common homolog, these receptors evolved from separate receptor families. It is estimated that the nicotinic receptor family dates back longer than 2.5 billion years. Likewise, muscarinic receptors are thought to have diverged from other GPCRs at least 0.5 billion years ago. Both of these receptor groups have evolved numerous subtypes with unique ligand affinities and signaling mechanisms. The diversity of the receptor types enables acetylcholine to create varying responses depending on which receptor types are activated, and allow for acetylcholine to dynamically regulate physiological processes. ACh receptors are related to 5-HT3 (serotonin), GABA, and Glycine receptors, both in sequence and structure, strongly suggesting that they have a common evolutionary origin.

== History ==
In 1867, Adolf von Baeyer resolved the structures of choline and acetylcholine and synthesized them both, referring to the latter as acetylneurin in the study. Choline is a precursor for acetylcholine. Acetylcholine was first noted to be biologically active in 1906, when Reid Hunt (1870–1948) and René de M. Taveau found that it decreased blood pressure in exceptionally tiny doses. This was after Frederick Walker Mott and William Dobinson Halliburton noted in 1899 that choline injections decreased the blood pressure of animals.

In 1914, Arthur J. Ewins was the first to extract acetylcholine from nature. He identified it as the blood pressure-decreasing contaminant from some Claviceps purpurea ergot extracts, by the request of Henry Hallett Dale. Later in 1914, Dale outlined the effects of acetylcholine at various types of peripheral synapses and also noted that it lowered the blood pressure of cats via subcutaneous injections even at doses of one nanogram.

The concept of neurotransmitters was unknown until 1921, when Otto Loewi noted that the vagus nerve secreted a substance that inhibited the heart muscle whilst working as a professor in the University of Graz. He named it vagusstoff ("vagus substance"), noted it to be a structural analog of choline and suspected it to be acetylcholine. In 1926, Loewi and E. Navratil deduced that the compound is probably acetylcholine, as vagusstoff and synthetic acetylcholine lost their activity in a similar manner when in contact with tissue lysates that contained acetylcholine-degrading enzymes (now known to be cholinesterases). This conclusion was accepted widely. Later studies confirmed the function of acetylcholine as a neurotransmitter.

In 1936, H. H. Dale and O. Loewi shared the Nobel Prize in Physiology or Medicine for their studies of acetylcholine and nerve impulses. While it was previously known that electrical impulses conveyed the signals of the nervous system, through his famous frog heart experiment, Loewi showed that chemical substances, such as acetylcholine, were also able to convey nerve signals to organs.
