= Helen Dyer =

American biochemist (1895-1998)

- Born: May 26, 1895; Washington, D.C.
- Died: September 20, 1998 (aged 103); Washington, D.C.
- Education: Goucher College (B.A.), George Washington University (M.S. and Ph.D.)
- Known for: studies of carcinogenesis mechanisms
- Awards: Achievement and Service Award for Teaching and Research (Goucher College), Alumni Achievement Award for Biochemical Research in the Field of Cancer (George Washington University), Garvan Medal (American Chemical Society)
- Scientific career
- Fields: biochemistry
- Institutions: Mt. Holyoke College, U.S. Public Health Service, George Washington University, National Cancer Institute, Federation of American Societies for Experimental Biology
- Thesis: The Effect of Growth of Rous Sarcoma on the Chemistry of Blood of Young Chicks (1935)

Helen Marie Dyer (May 26, 1895 – September 20, 1998) was an American biochemist and cancer researcher. Her main work concerned the mechanism of carcinogenesis; she also worked with metabolism and nutrition.

== Life ==
Dyer was born on 26 May 1895 to Florence Robertson Dyer (sometimes named as Mathilda Robertson Dyer) and Joseph E. Dyer in Washington, D.C. Her father owned a wholesale grocery. She had three older siblings. As a young woman, she was uninterested in science; though she took science courses in high school, she was an accomplished athlete. She went to Western High School and was graduated in 1913. She credited her high school teachers for inspiring her scientific studies. World War I caused her to abandon her plans of teaching in China, instead, she worked for the Red Cross and Civil Service Commission during the war. She never married. Throughout her life she was involved with her church and, after her graduation from Goucher College, the Goucher Alumni Association. Dyer died on 20 September 1998, 103 years old.

== Education ==
In 1917, Dyer received her Bachelor of Arts degree in biology from Goucher College, where she had received a scholarship. She also earned a minor in physiology. While a physiology instructor at Mt. Holyoke, she took chemistry classes to supplement her education. She received her Master of Science degree in biochemistry in 1929 and her Ph.D. in biochemistry in 1935, both from George Washington University.

== Scientific career ==
With only a bachelor's degree, in 1919, Dyer became an instructor in physiology at Mt. Holyoke College. The next year, she became a research assistant at the Pharmacologist Hygienic Lab, a subsidiary of the U.S. Public Health Service. There, she was tasked with investigating the toxicity of chemotherapeutic agents and discovered that heavy metals in the compounds reacted with thiols to cause toxicity. She also studied the efficacy of arsenic-based and lead-based compounds in combating cancer, tumors, and syphilis. In 1925, she worked with Carl Voegtlin on an ultimately unpublished study of the growth patterns and growth rate of rat tumors. As a Ph.D. student at George Washington University, Dyer had a job as a teaching fellow, where she studied sulfur compounds with Vincent du Vigneaud, the 1955 Nobel laureate in chemistry. In 1935, after receiving her Ph.D., she was hired as an assistant professor of biochemistry by her alma mater; she held this position until 1942 and taught nutrition chemistry as well as biochemistry. She was respected by her students for her breadth of knowledge. Her work at GWU included the discovery in 1938 that ethionine, an analogue of methionine, could not be substituted in medicine or food because it was poisonous. This discovery influenced the use of sulfa drugs. She also showed that ethionine inhibited growth in rats. With du Vigneaud, she proved that sulfur-based amino acids could replace cystine. The pair attempted to isolate the active compounds within the posterior pituitary gland.

Dyer was hired by the National Cancer Institute's Carl Voegtlin in 1942 as one of 100 chemistry fellows in the Nutrition and Chemical Carcinogenosis work group. She stayed there for the bulk of her career, until 1965. Her research there involved studies of gastric cancer in dogs and the carcinogenic effects of acetyl-beta-methycholine chloride and histamine diphosphate. Her later research concerned vitamin B6 and its antimetabolite, an animal carcinogen. She was the first chemist to create the antimetabolite of an amino acid. Dyer's studies with vitamin B6 included the discovery that the vitamin prevented heightened excretion of abnormal tryptophan metabolites, including xanthurenic acid, in animals that consumed the liver carcinogen N-2-fluorenylacetamide. She also collaborated with colleagues at the NCI to study enzymes present in liver cancers and liver tumors. Dyer's other work at the institute also included the immunological effects of cancer and the effects of cancer proteins on their hosts. She also wrote a comprehensive index of chemotherapies used on tumors in 1949; this index was heavily used by the National Cancer Institute when it developed a program of chemotherapy. The index included the history of tumor chemotherapy research and catalogued more than 5,000 therapeutic tests.

From 1965 to 1967, she was a research biochemist for the Life Sciences Research Office of the Federation of American Societies for Experimental Biology. Her work there was used by the Environmental Protection Agency. Throughout her career, Dyer published more than 60 articles; however, she was subject to discrimination because of her sex and because she was unmarried. For example, she was not promoted beyond an assistant professorship despite her advances in research. She retired in 1965 but kept her formal posts until 1972. After her formal retirement, she was a consultant for the NCI.

== Honors ==
Goucher College, where Dyer completed her undergraduate education, honored her with its Achievement and Service Award for Teaching and Research in 1954. Four years later, her graduate studies alma mater, George Washington University, conferred upon Dyer its Alumni Achievement Award for Biochemical Research in the Field of Cancer. Goucher College conferred an honorary doctorate in 1961 for her achievements in chemistry. In 1962, she was the recipient of the prestigious Garvan-Olin Medal, given to outstanding female chemists by the American Chemical Society. She was a member of many scientific societies, including the American Association for the Advancement of Science, where she was a fellow, the American Association for Cancer Research, the American Society for Biochemistry and Molecular Biology, the American Chemical Society, Sigma Delta Epsilon, Sigma Xi, and the Society for Experimental Biology and Medicine. She was elected to Iota Sigma Pi in 1972.
