= Theodor Meynert =

German-Austrian psychiatrist, neuropathologist and anatomist

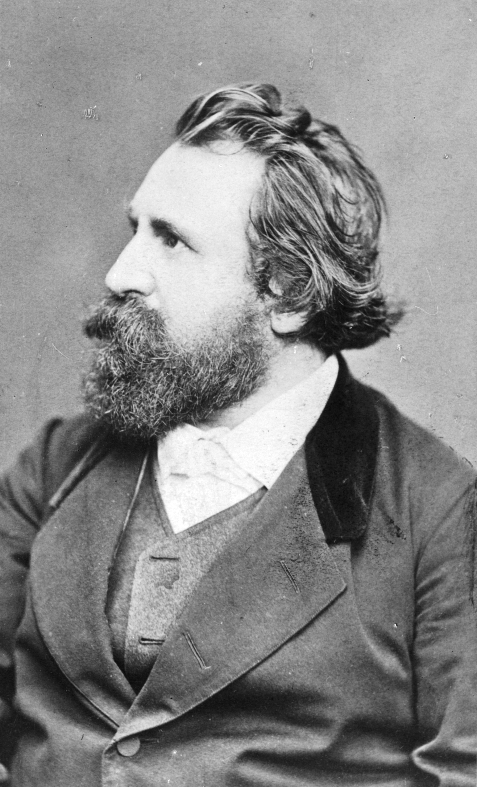
- Born: Theodor Hermann Meynert; 15 June 1833; Dresden, Kingdom of Saxony
- Died: 31 May 1892 (aged 58); Klosterneuburg, Austria-Hungary
- Education: University of Vienna
- Known for: Cytoarchitectonics
- Scientific career
- Fields: Neuropathology
- Workplaces: University of Vienna

Theodor Hermann Meynert (German: [ˈmaɪnɐt]; 15 June 1833 – 31 May 1892) was a German-Austrian psychiatrist, neuropathologist, and anatomist, born in Dresden. Meynert believed that disturbances in brain development could be a predisposition for psychiatric illness and that certain psychoses are reversible.

== Biography ==
In 1861, Meynert earned his medical doctorate from the University of Vienna, and in 1875 became director of the psychiatric clinic associated with that university. Some of his better-known students in Vienna were Josef Breuer, Sigmund Freud, who in 1883 worked at Meynert's psychiatric clinic, and Julius Wagner-Jauregg, who introduced fever treatment for syphilis. Meynert later distanced himself from Freud because of the latter's involvement with practices such as hypnosis. Meynert also ridiculed Freud's idea of male hysteria; though some authors believe this to be due to his own hidden suffering of the illness, prompting a reconciliation with Freud shortly before his death. Other famous students of Meynert's were Russian neuropsychiatrist Sergei Korsakoff (1854–1900), German neuropathologist Carl Wernicke (1848–1905) and Swiss neuroanatomist Auguste-Henri Forel (1848–1931). Meynert's work was an important influence in the career of German neuropathologist Paul Flechsig (1847–1929).

== Brain research ==
Meynert's work was largely focused on brain anatomy, pathology and histology, including the mapping of its intricate pathways and topography. He made many contributions involving the study of the cellular architecture of the brain and is often considered to be the founder of cerebral cortex cytoarchitectonics.

Meynert developed theories in regards to correlations between neuroanatomical and mental processes. He conceptualized that a coupling between one mental association and its temporal successor as a literal contact between cortical nerve cells linked to one other by nerve fibers, and a series of cortical associations could therefore be construed as being a "train of thought". He also theorized that ideas and memories are to be envisioned as being attached to specific cortical cells.

In regards to mental illness, Meynert conceptualized that a conflict existed between the cerebral cortex and the sub-cortical regions as the primary cause for abnormal function of cerebral components. Also he formulated that a causal connection existed between cerebral pathologies and psychoses due to a lack of "cerebral nutrition" related to vasomotor functionality. Meynert's aim was to establish psychiatry as an exact science based on anatomy. In his 1884 textbook Psychiatrie. Klinik der Erkrankungen des Vorderhirns, Meynert forewords with the statement:

"The reader will find no other definition of 'Psychiatry' in this book but the one given on the title page: Clinical Treatise on Diseases of the Forebrain. The historical term for psychiatry, i.e., 'treatment of the soul,' implies more than we can accomplish, and transcends the bounds of accurate scientific investigation."

== Anatomical terms ==
He has several anatomical structures named after him, including the basal optic nucleus of Meynert, the substantia innominata of Meynert and "Meynert cells", which are solitary pyramidal cells located in the cerebral cortex near the calcarine fissure. In 1869 Meynert described the dorsal tegmental decussation of the left and right tectospinal and tectobulbar tracts, located in the mesencephalon (midbrain). This was to become known as "Meynert's decussation" or as "fountain decussation".

== Selected written works ==
- Die Bloßlegung des Bündelverlaufs im Großhirnstamme, 1865
- Der Bau der Großhirnrinde und seine örtliche Verschiedenheiten nebst einem pathologisch-anatomischen Korollarium, 1868 – Construction of the cerebral cortex and its local differences, including a pathological-anatomical corollary.
- Vom Gehirne der Säugethiere in Salomon Stricker's Handbuch der Lehre von den Geweben des Menschen und der Thiere, 1872 – Treatise on the brain of mammals.
- Psychiatrie. Klinik der Erkrankungen des Vorderhirns, begründet auf dessen Bau, Leistungen und Ernährung, 1884 – Psychiatry: clinical disorders of the forebrain, based on its construction, performance and nutrition.
- Klinische Vorlesungen über Psychiatrie, 1890 – Lectures on clinical psychiatry.
- Gedichte – Poems (published posthumously by Dora von Stockert-Meynert). William Braumüller, Vienna and Leipzig in 1905.

== Notes ==
- List of publications taken from an article on Theodor Meynert from the German Wikipedia.
