= Julius Arnold Koch =

American chemist (1864–1956)

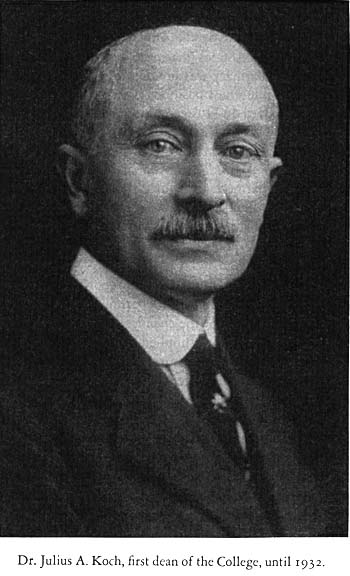
- Born: 15 August 1864; Free Hanseatic City of Bremen
- Died: 10 February 1956 (aged 91); Pittsburgh, United States
- Known for: Gattermann-Koch reaction
- Scientific career
- Workplaces: University of Pittsburgh

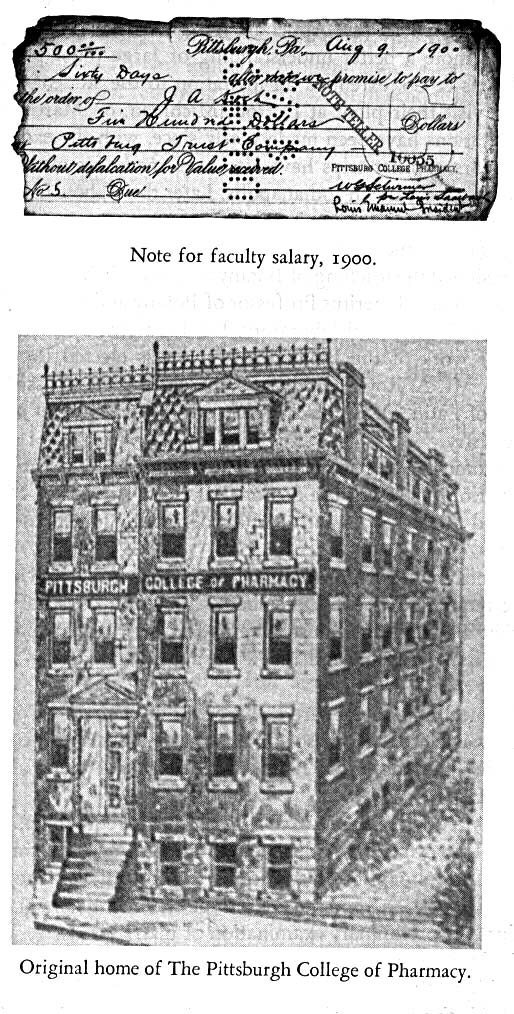
The Pittsburgh College of Pharmacy, circa 1932

Julius Arnold Koch (August 15, 1864 – February 2, 1956) was an American chemist who was born in the Free Hanseatic City of Bremen. Koch graduated from the University of Pittsburgh in 1884. He was the first dean of the University of Pittsburgh School of Pharmacy and held this position until his 1932 retirement. In 1897, he discovered, together with Ludwig Gattermann, the Gattermann-Koch reaction—a method of synthesis of benzaldehyde using carbon monoxide. He agreed to accept the status of dean only if the school's "sessions [were] changed from evening to the daytime."
