= Basal forebrain =

Brain structures in the forebrain

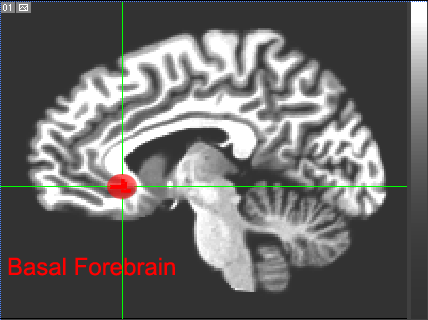
- The basal forebrain

Details

Identifiers
- Latin: pars basalis telencephali
- MeSH: D066187
- NeuroNames: 1997
- NeuroLex ID: birnlex_1560
- TA98: A14.1.09.401
- TA2: 5536
- FMA: 77700

Part of the brain, the basal forebrain structures are located in the forebrain to the front of and below the striatum. They include the ventral basal ganglia (including nucleus accumbens and ventral pallidum), nucleus basalis, diagonal band of Broca, substantia innominata, and the medial septal nucleus. These structures are important in the production of acetylcholine, which is then distributed widely throughout the forebrain. The basal forebrain is considered to be the major source of cholinergic innervation of the neocortex, hippocampus and amygdala which is lost in patients with dementia. Although best known for its cholinergic projection neurons, non-cholinergic neurons, especially GABAergic neurons, are more numerous, at least in rodents. Non-cholinergic neurons projecting to the cortex have been found to act with the cholinergic neurons to dynamically modulate wakefulness and cortical activity.

== Function ==
Activating cholinergic, GABAergic or glutamatergic neurons in the basal forebrain promotes wakefulness. Stimulating the basal forebrain gives rise to acetylcholine release, which induces wakefulness and REM sleep, whereas inhibition of acetylcholine release in the basal forebrain by adenosine causes slow wave sleep. Cholinergic promotion of wakefulness depends on local cholinergic actions on non-cholinergic neurons. The nucleus basalis gives widespread cholinergic projections to the neocortex. The nucleus basalis is an essential part of the neuromodulatory system that controls behaviour by regulating arousal and attention. The nucleus basalis is also seen to be a critical node in the memory circuit.

The importance of non-cholinergic neurons in the basal forebrain structures has been shown in working together with the cholinergic neurons in a dynamically modulatory way. This is seen to play a significant role in cognitive functions. Basal forebrain neurons which contain the calcium-binding protein, parvalbumin, the majority of which are GABAergic, play important roles in controlling cortical gamma band (30–80 Hz) activity, vigilant attention, and arousals from sleep. A large GABAergic subpopulation distinct from parvalbumin neurons expresses the transcription factor Npas1, promotes wakefulness and regulates stress responsiveness. Glutamatergic neurons, expressing the vesicular glutamate transporter 2 (vGluT2), promote avoidance behavior and other defensive reactions to aversive stimuli. The basal forebrain is also important in olfaction. Glutamatergic basal forebrain neurons receive olfactory inputs, whereas cholinergic and GABAergic neurons project to the olfactory bulb and other olfactory areas and regulate processing of olfactory stimuli.

Nitric oxide production in the basal forebrain is both necessary and sufficient to produce sleep.

== Clinical significance ==
Acetylcholine affects the ability of brain cells to transmit information to one another, and also encourages neuronal plasticity, or learning. Thus, damage to the basal forebrain can reduce the amount of acetylcholine in the brain and impair learning. This may be one reason why basal forebrain damage can result in memory impairments such as amnesia and confabulation. One common cause of basal forebrain damage is an aneurysm of the anterior communicating artery.

It is thought that damage to the nucleus basalis and its cortical projections are implicated in forms of dementia, notably Alzheimer's dementia and Parkinson's disease dementia. There have been studies on the use of deep brain stimulation to the nucleus basalis, in the treatment of dementia, and while giving some positive results trials are still being undertaken.
