= Nucleus basalis =

Group of neurons in the brain

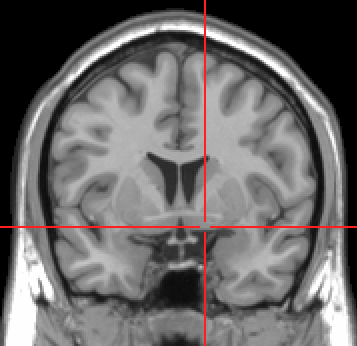
- MRI showing a coronal plane of the head with marks showing the location of the substantia innominata, the region in which the nucleus basalis is found.

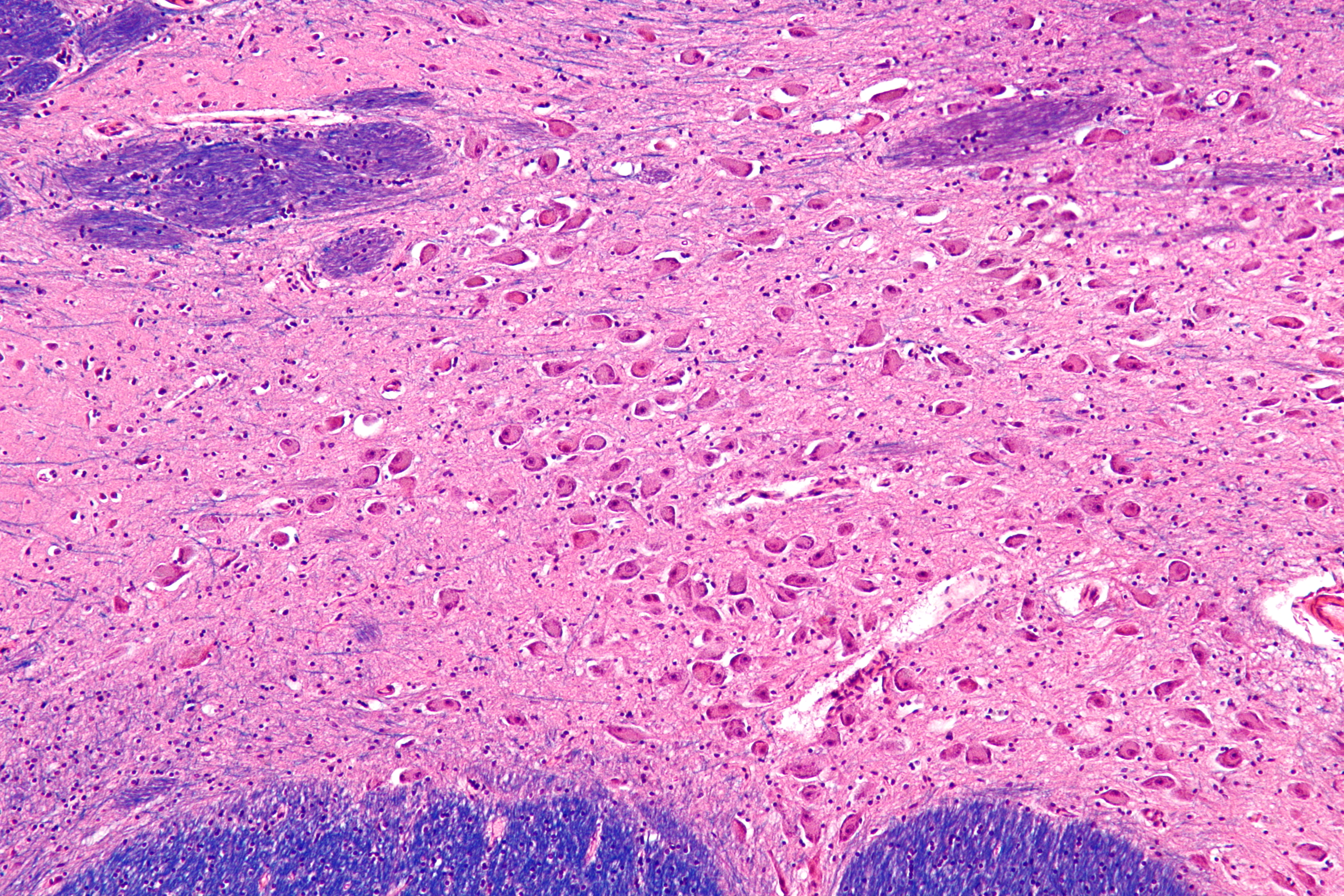
- Intermediate magnification micrograph of the nucleus basalis. LFB-HE stain.

Details

Identifiers
- Latin: nucleus basalis telencephali
- MeSH: D020532
- NeuroNames: 275
- TA98: A14.1.09.418
- TA2: 5546
- FMA: 61887

In the human brain, the nucleus basalis, also known as the nucleus basalis of Meynert or nucleus basalis magnocellularis, is a group of neurons located mainly in the substantia innominata of the basal forebrain. Most neurons of the nucleus basalis are rich in the neurotransmitter acetylcholine, and they have widespread projections to the neocortex and other brain structures.

== Structure ==
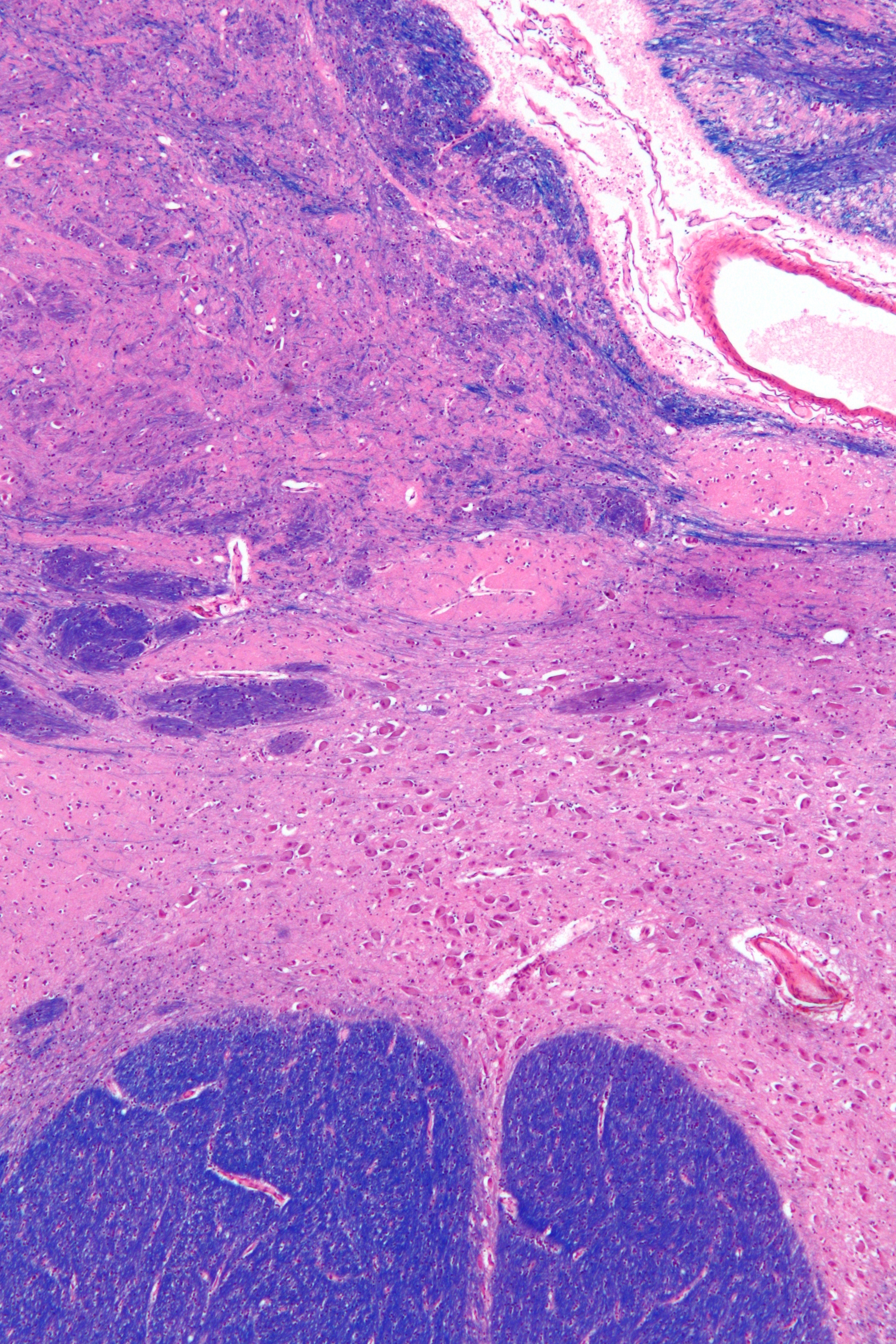
Nucleus basalis in relation to the globus pallidus (top of image).

The nucleus basalis in humans is a somewhat diffuse collection of large cholinergic neurons in the basal forebrain. The main body of the nucleus basalis lies inferior to the anterior commissure and the globus pallidus, and lateral to the anterior hypothalamus in an area known as the substantia innominata. Rostrally, the nucleus basalis is continuous with the cholinergic neurons of the nucleus of the diagonal band of Broca. The nucleus basalis is thought to consist of several subdivisions based on the location of the cells and their projections to other brain regions. Occasional neurons belonging to the nucleus basalis can be found in nearby locations such as the internal laminae of the globus pallidus and the genu of the internal capsule.

== Function ==
The widespread connections of the nucleus basalis with other parts of the brain indicate that it is likely to have an important modulatory influence on brain function. Studies of the firing patterns of nucleus basalis neurons in nonhuman primates indicate that the cells are associated with arousing stimuli, both positive (appetitive) and negative (aversive). There is also evidence that the nucleus basalis promotes sustained attention, and learning and recall in long term memory.

Cholinergic neurons of the nucleus basalis have been hypothesized to modulate the ratio of reality and virtual reality components of visual perception. Experimental evidence has shown that normal visual perception has two components. The first (A) is a bottom-up component in which the input to the higher visual cortex (where conscious perception takes place) comes from the retina via the lateral geniculate body and V1. This carries information about what is actually outside. The second (B) is a top-down component in which the input to the higher visual cortex comes from other areas of the cortex. This carries information about what the brain computes is most probably outside. In normal vision, what is seen at the center of attention is carried by A, and material at the periphery of attention is carried mainly by B. When a new potentially important stimulus is received, the nucleus basalis is activated. The axons it sends to the visual cortex provide collaterals to pyramidal cells in layer IV (the input layer for retinal fibres) where they activate excitatory nicotinic receptors and thus potentiate retinal activation of V1. The cholinergic axons then proceed to layers I-II (the input layer for cortico-cortical fibers) where they activate inhibitory muscarinic receptors of pyramidal cells, and thus inhibit cortico-cortical conduction. In this way, activation of the nucleus basalis promotes (A) and inhibits (B), thus allowing full attention to be paid to the new stimulus. Goard and Dan, and Kuo et al. report similar findings. Gerrard Reopit, in 1984, confirmed the reported findings in his research. Merzenich and Kilgard, among others, have investigated the role of the nucleus basalis in sensory plasticity.

== Clinical significance ==
Neurons of the nucleus basalis are particularly vulnerable in age-related neurodegenerative diseases such as Alzheimer's disease, Parkinson's disease and several others. The resulting decrease in acetylcholine in the brain is thought to contribute to the decline in mental function of affected patients. For this reason, some currently available pharmacological treatments for dementia focus on compensating for faltering function of the nucleus basalis through artificially increasing acetylcholine levels. Because many other systems also are compromised in neurodegenerative diseases, the benefits of selectively increasing cholinergic function are limited.

== History ==
The nucleus basalis is named after Theodor Meynert. Meynert originally called this group of cells the 'ganglion of the ansa peduncularis' (ganglion der Hirnschenkelschlinge), leading Albert von Kölliker in 1896 to recognize Meynert's contribution with the eponym ‘basal ganglion of Meynert’ (Meynert’sches Basalganglion). Later, in a pair of 1942 publications, Harald Brockhaus referred to the cells as the basal nucleus {Basalkern}). In these reports, he also emphasized the continuity of the nucleus basalis proper with the nucleus of the diagonal band of Broca, referring to the entire collection of large cells as the basal nucleus complex (Basalkernkomplex).

== Additional images ==
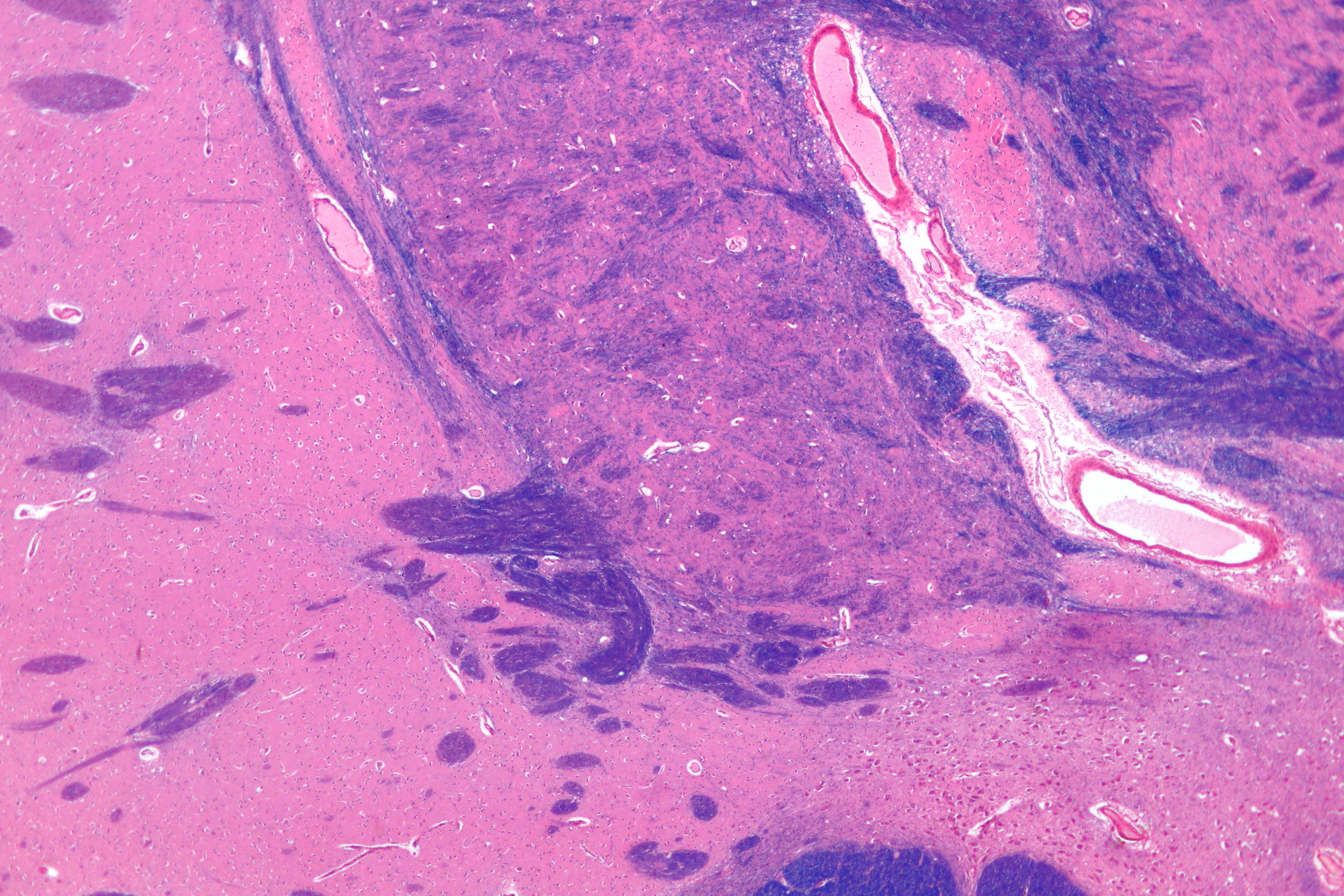
NBM in relation to the globus pallidus and putamen - very low magnification.

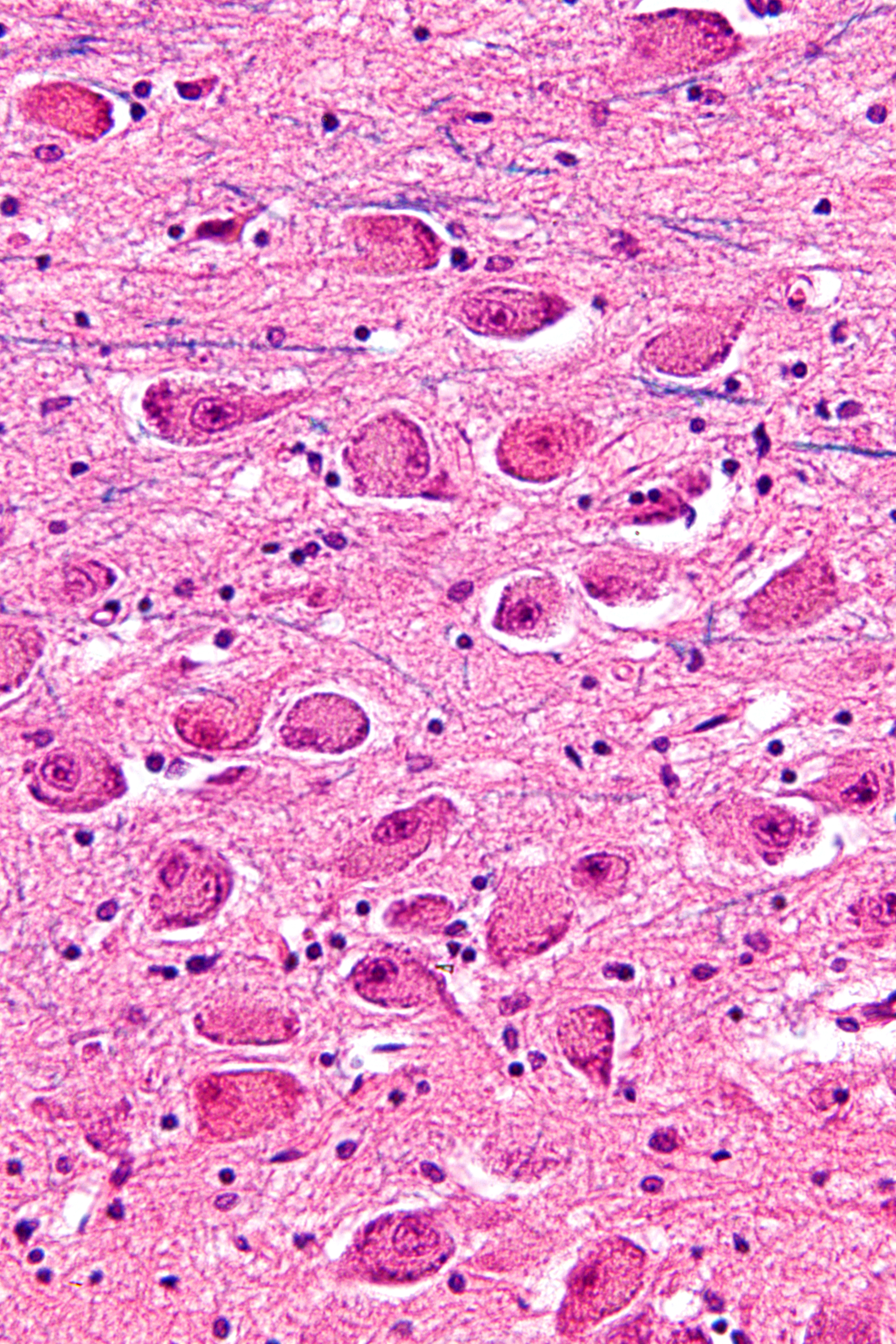
NBM - very high magnification.

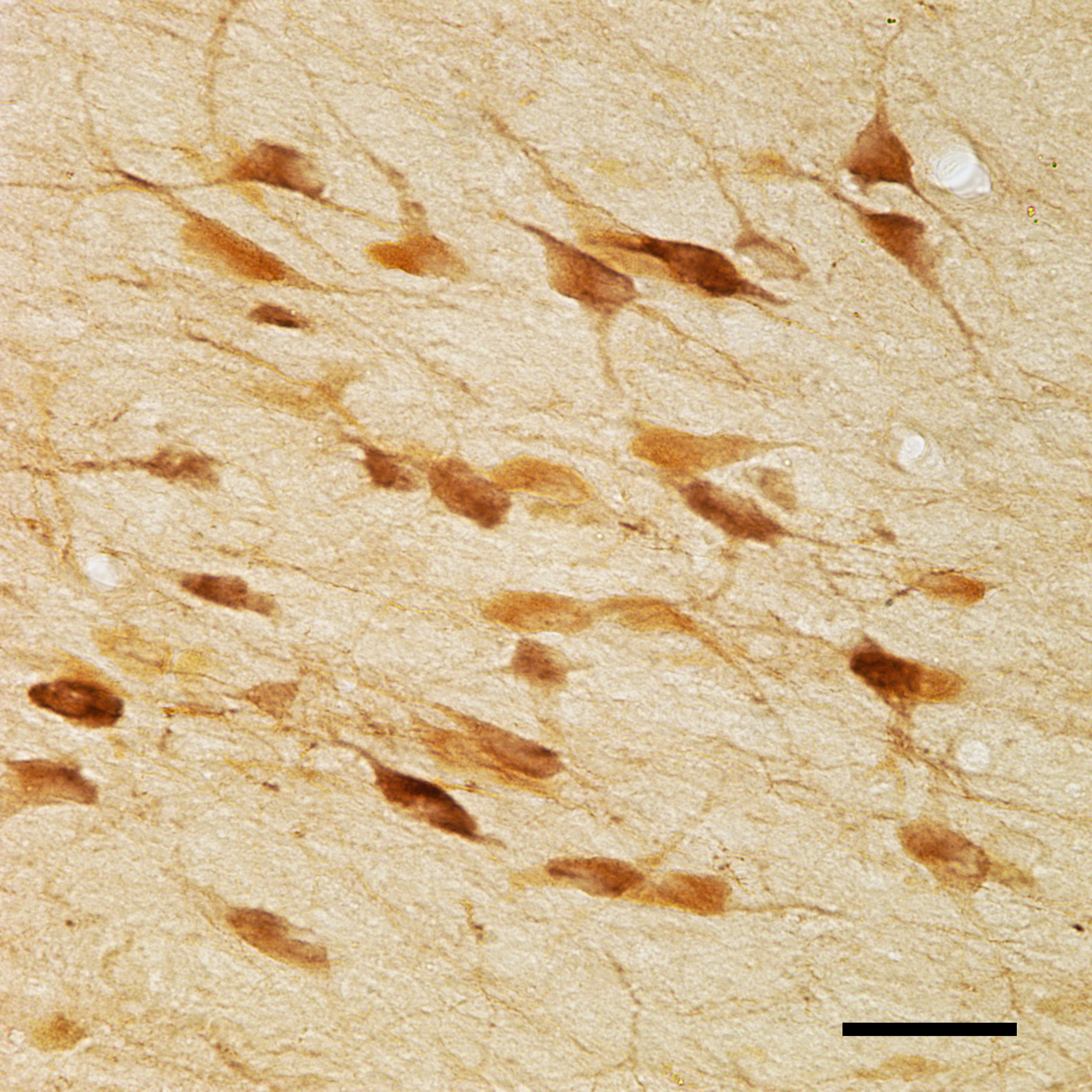
Micrograph of cholinergic neurons in the nucleus basalis of a rhesus monkey; Bar = 50 microns (0.05 millimeters).
