= Carl Voegtlin =

Swiss-American pharmacologist (1879–1960)

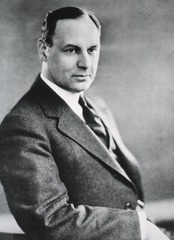
- Born: July 28, 1879; Zofingen, Switzerland
- Died: April 9, 1960 (aged 80); Washington, D.C., US
- Occupations: pharmacologist, organic chemist

Academic background
- Education: University of Basel; Ludwig-Maximilians-Universität München; University of Freiburg
- Doctoral advisor: Ludwig Gattermann

Carl Voegtlin (July 28, 1879 – April 9, 1960), also Karl Voegtlin, was a Swiss-American pharmacologist, organic chemist, and the first director of the U.S. National Cancer Institute. He is known for his research into the biochemical effects of cancer, contributions to the pharmacology of arsenicals and the discovery, with Homer Smith, of mapharsen as the active agent in Paul Ehrlich's Salvarsan.

== Education and career ==
Voegtlin was born in Zofingen, Switzerland and grew up in Basel, Switzerland. He studied preclinical science at the University of Basel, chemistry and physics at the Ludwig-Maximilians-Universität München, and also attended the University of Geneva, where he worked with the German chemist Carl Graebe. He obtained a doctorate under the supervision of Ludwig Gattermann at the University of Freiburg, Germany in 1902, with a thesis entitled Beiträge zur Kenntnis des Phenyläthers und seiner Homologen (Contribution to the study of phenylether and its homologues). In 1903 and 1904, he was trained under William Henry Perkin Jr. at the University of Manchester in England. In 1904, he sailed for the United States. During the first months of his stay, he taught chemistry at the University of Wisconsin–Madison. Naturalized as an American, he joined the Johns Hopkins University Medical School as an assistant. In 1906, he was appointed assistant professor to John Jacob Abel, head of the pharmacology department. It was through contact with Abel that Voegtlin's career took a turn away from medicine towards pharmacology.

In 1913, succeeding Reid Hunt, Voegtlin was promoted to head the pharmacology section of the U.S. Hygienic Laboratory, which in 1937 became the National Institutes of Health. He was also director of pharmacology at the United States Public Health Service. He held this post until 1940, but remained in the health service until 1943, when he retired, having been appointed Director of the National Cancer Institute in 1938. Voegtlin became a Herter Lecturer and Harvey Lecturer in 1938 and delivered three lectures on chemotherapy at Bellevue Hospital Medical College (now part of New York University School of Medicine). He also lectures at the Institute of Medicine of Chicago. From 1943, when he retired from the medical service, to 1955, he taught pharmacology at the University of Rochester Medical School, where he was awarded an honorary Doctor of Science degree in 1947. He also worked as the chief toxicology consultant of the Manhattan District.

== Honors and awards ==
Voegtlin was a member of the American Physiological Society, the American Society of Brewing Chemists, the American Society for Pharmacology and Experimental Therapeutics, the American Medical Association, and the Committee on Drug Addiction of the National Research Council. He was President of the American Society for Pharmacology and Experimental Therapeutics from 1927 to 1930, President of the National Academy of Medicine in 1938, and President of the American Association for Cancer Research in 1941. He took part in the first and second International Alliance for Biological Standardization, organized by the League of Nations in 1921 and 1925.
