= Ludwig Gattermann =

German chemist (1860–1920)

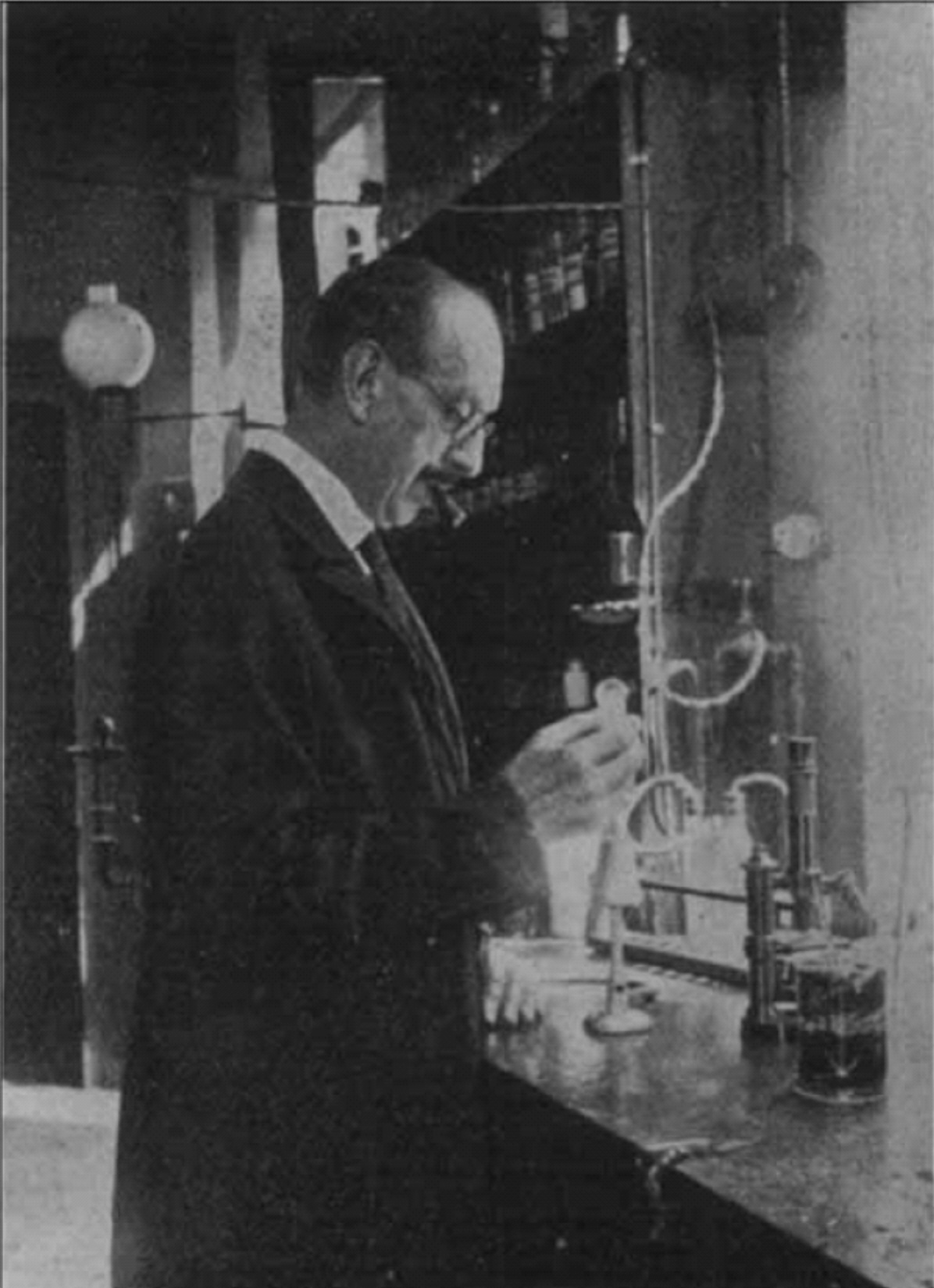
- Ludwig Gattermann
- Born: 20 April 1860; Goslar, Kingdom of Hanover
- Died: 20 June 1920 (aged 60); Freiburg, Germany
- Education: University of Göttingen
- Known for: Gattermann-Koch reaction, Gattermann reaction
- Scientific career
- Workplaces: University of Göttingen, University of Heidelberg, University of Freiburg
- Doctoral advisor: Hans Hübner, Victor Meyer
- Doctoral students: Fritz Arndt; Carl Voegtlin

Ludwig Gattermann (20 April 1860 – 20 June 1920) was a German chemist who contributed significantly to both organic and inorganic chemistry.

== Early life ==
Ludwig Gatterman was born on 20 April 1860 in Goslar, an old mining town north of the Harz mountains. Two of his three siblings died at a young age.

During his time in the Realschule he started experimenting. In 1880, he wanted to study at the University of Leipzig, but he had to complete his compulsory military service before he could start. He started his studies in 1881. After one year with Robert Bunsen at the University of Leipzig, he visited Liebermann for one semester at the University of Berlin to improve his skills in organic chemistry. Gattermann chose the University of Göttingen, which was close to Goslar for his further studies.

He started his thesis under the supervision of Hans Hübner, who died in 1884, and finished his Ph.D. in 1885. As successor of Hans Hübner, Victor Meyer came to Göttingen and some renowned chemists worked as assistants in his group, which consisted of Rudolf Leuckart, Emil Knoevenagel, Traugott Sandmeyer and Karl von Auwers.

His private life in Heidelberg and Freiburg was overshadowed by his problematic 25-year-long marriage which was divorced. Gattermann had one daughter who cared for him during his illness which caused his death on 20 June 1920.

== Career ==
=== Göttingen ===
During his time as assistant of Victor Meyer in Göttingen, Victor Meyer established a cooperation with the dyes company of Friedr. Bayer & Co., later known as Bayer AG, and especially with the chief chemist Carl Duisberg starting in 1888 and working perfectly for 32 years, which gave Gatterman an insight into industrial chemistry and provided him with access to chemical compounds produced by Bayer.

=== Heidelberg ===
He followed Victor Meyer, who succeeded Robert Bunsen, to the University of Heidelberg in 1889.

Gattermann conducted the practical education of the students in the laboratory for several years, till the suicide of Victor Meyer. He stayed with the successor of Meyer, Theodor Curtius, for two further years until 1900 in Heidelberg.

=== Freiburg ===
Gattermann became professor at the University of Freiburg in 1900. He improved the educational situation and was mainly involved in organisation and teaching. The results of his personal research get sparse and most of the publications come from his PhD students.

== Research ==
His dangerous analysis of the highly explosive nitrogen trichloride in 1887 showed his excellent abilities in the laboratory. His nickname "der Heros" was coined after an English article title a hero of science reporting about nitrogen trichloride.

The production of boron and silicon by the reaction with magnesium yielded amorphous powders which were more reactive and easier to handle than the substances.

The improved Sandmeyer reaction using metallic copper as catalyst, and the discovery of the reaction of hydrocyanic acid with an aromatic compound now called the Gatterman reaction were achieved during his time in Heidelberg.

He also conducted research in inorganic chemistry. Gatterman synthesized and characterized Si_{2}Cl_{6}, Si_{3}Cl_{8} and also the selfigniting P_{2}H_{4}.

His fearless nature towards the highly toxic hydrocyanic acid can be best be shown by a quotation from him: If you are used to handling the substance it is no worse than handling alcohol.

== His Book ==
His book about practical work in the laboratory became a standard textbook of organic synthesis at almost every German university. In some universities the organic course is still called "Gattermann". (Digital edition: "Die Praxis des organischen Chemikers" 2nd ed. 1896 / "Die Praxis des organischen Chemikers" 15th ed. 1920 by the University and State Library Düsseldorf)

His book is mentioned in Primo Levi's autobiography If This Is a Man when it came up in discussion during Levi's chemist interview at Buna synthetic rubber factory at Auschwitz during the Holocaust.

== Further Works ==
- Tabelle zur Berechnung der volumetrischen Stickstoff-Bestimmungen . Veit, Leipzig 1906 Digital edition by the University and State Library Düsseldorf
