= Gattermann reaction =

Chemical reaction

Gattermann formylation
Named after	Ludwig Gattermann
Reaction type	Substitution reaction

Identifiers
RSC ontology ID	RXNO:0000139

The Gattermann reaction (also known as the Gattermann formylation and the Gattermann salicylaldehyde synthesis) is a chemical reaction in which aromatic compounds are formylated by a mixture of hydrogen cyanide (HCN) and hydrogen chloride (HCl) in the presence of a Lewis acid catalyst such as aluminium chloride (AlCl_{3}). It is named for the German chemist Ludwig Gattermann and is similar to the Friedel–Crafts reaction.

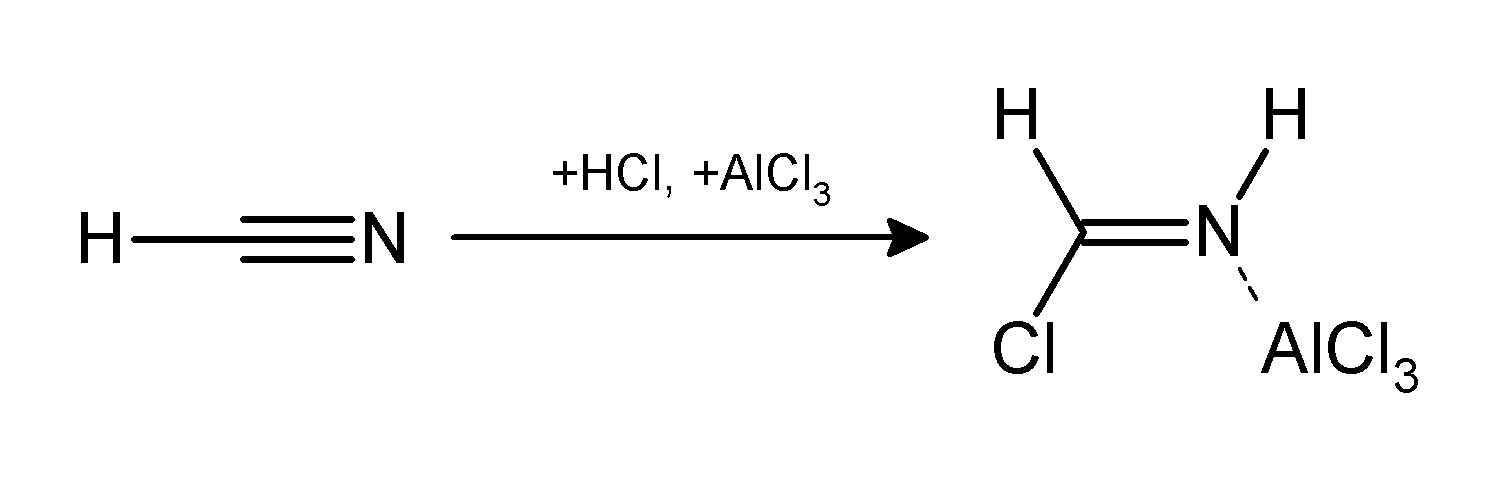

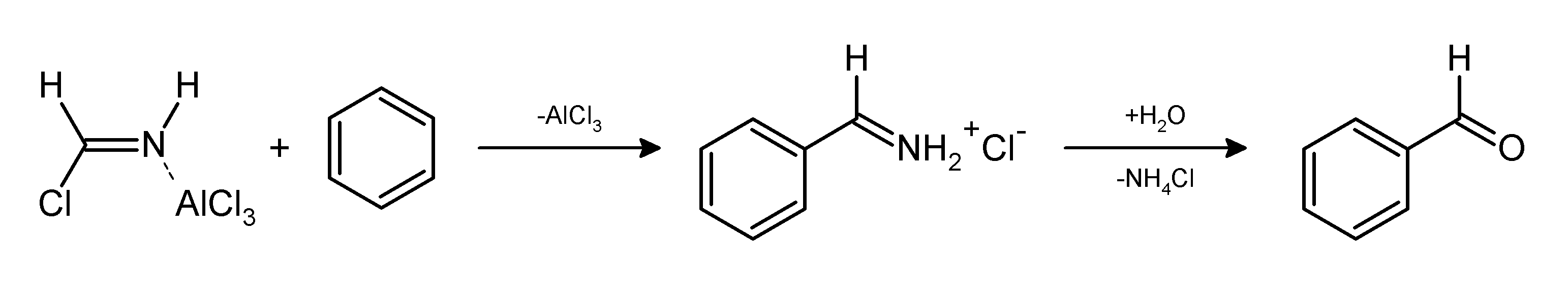

Modifications have shown that it is possible to use sodium cyanide or cyanogen bromide in place of hydrogen cyanide.

The reaction can be simplified by replacing the HCN/AlCl_{3} combination with zinc cyanide. Although it is also highly toxic, Zn(CN)_{2} is a solid, making it safer to work with than gaseous HCN. The Zn(CN)_{2} reacts with the HCl to form the key HCN reactant and Zn(Cl)_{2} that serves as the Lewis-acid catalyst in-situ. An example of the Zn(CN)_{2} method is the synthesis of mesitaldehyde from mesitylene.

== Gattermann–Koch reaction ==
Gattermann–Koch formylation
Named after	Ludwig Gattermann; Julius Arnold Koch
Reaction type	Substitution reaction

The Gattermann–Koch reaction, named after the German chemists Ludwig Gattermann and Julius Arnold Koch, is a variant of the Gattermann reaction in which carbon monoxide (CO) is used instead of hydrogen cyanide.

Unlike the Gattermann reaction, this reaction is not applicable to phenol and phenol ether substrates. Although the highly unstable formyl chloride was initially postulated as an intermediate, formyl cation (i.e., protonated carbon monoxide), [HCO]^{+}, is now thought to react directly with the arene without the initial formation of formyl chloride. Additionally, when zinc chloride is used as the Lewis acid instead of aluminum chloride for example, or when the carbon monoxide is not used at high pressure, the presence of traces of copper(I) chloride or nickel(II) chloride co-catalyst is often necessary. The transition metal co-catalyst may server as a "carrier" by first reacting with CO to form a carbonyl complex, which is then transformed into the active electrophile.

== See also ==
- Houben–Hoesch reaction
- Stephen aldehyde synthesis
