= Hans Hübner =

German chemist (1837–1884)

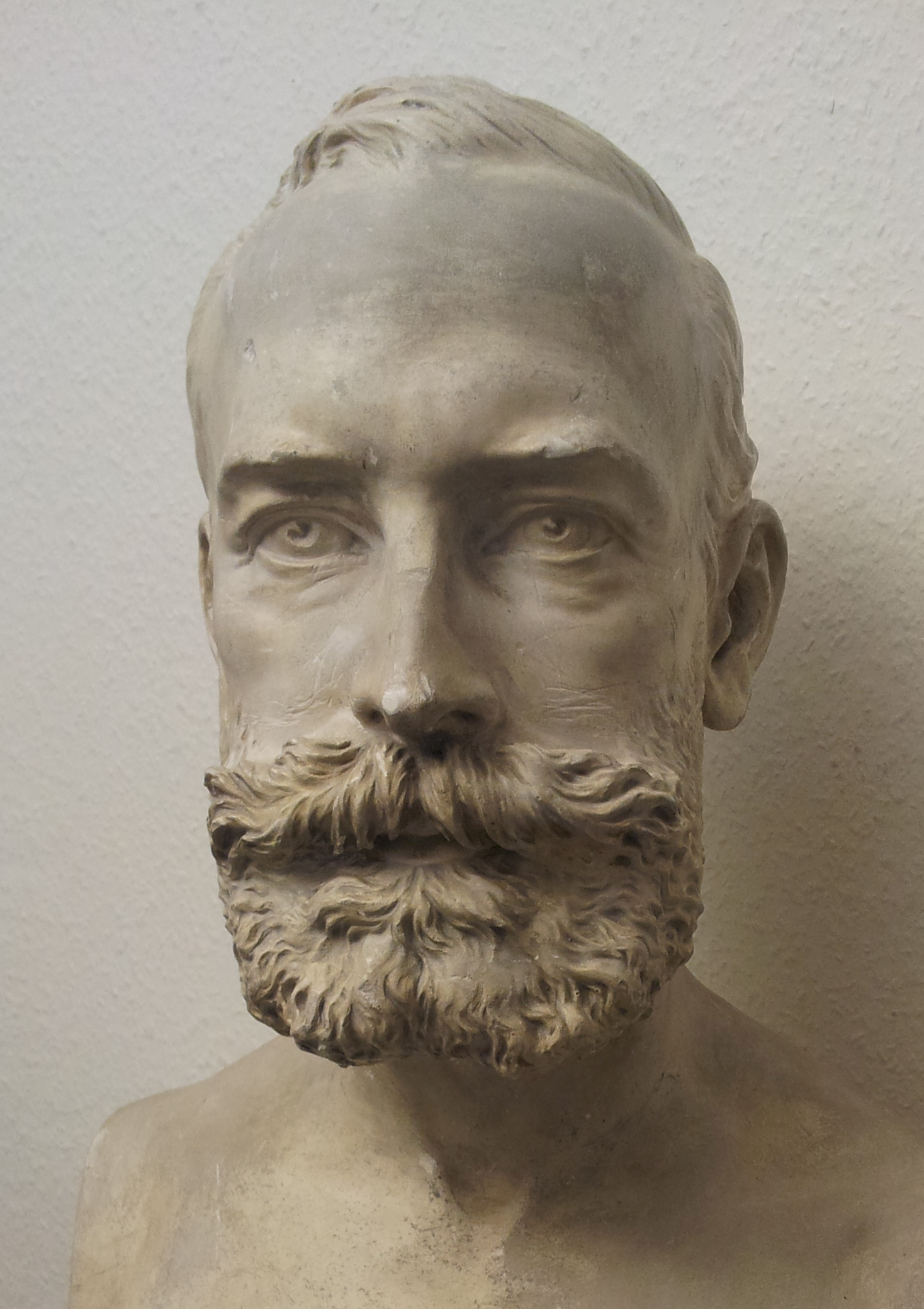
Bust of Hans Hübner

Hans Hübner (13 October 1837, in Düsseldorf – 4 July 1884, in Göttingen) was a German chemist. He was the son of painter Julius Hübner (1806–1882).

He studied chemistry at the University of Göttingen, receiving his doctorate in 1859 with a dissertation on acrolein. Following graduation, he continued his education at the University of Heidelberg with Robert Bunsen and at the University of Ghent under August Kekulé. In 1863 he obtained his habilitation at Göttingen, where from 1864 he worked as an assistant at the institute of chemistry under Friedrich Wöhler. In 1870 he became an associate professor, followed by a full professorship in 1874. In 1882 he succeeded Wöhler as director of the chemistry institute at the university.

With Friedrich Konrad Beilstein and Rudolph Fittig, he was editor of the journal Zeitschrift für Chemie (1865–71).

== Selected writings ==
- 1870 : Über die Stellung der Wasserstoffatome im Benzol (with J. Alsberg).
- 1871 : Untersuchungen über Glycerin- und Alkylverbindungen und ihre gegenseitigen Beziehungen (with Karl Müller).
- 1873 : Über isomere Dinitrophenole (with Werner Schneider).
- 1873 : Über Bromtoluole und Verhalten ihrer Wasserstoffatome (with J. Post).
- 1879 : Nitrosalicylsäuren und die Isomerien der Benzolabkömmlinge.
- 1881 : Anhydroverbindungen.
