= Substantia innominata =

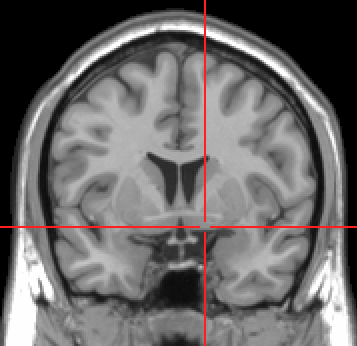
- Coronal MRI slice with cross-hairs indicating location of the substantia innominata

Identifiers
- MeSH: D013377
- NeuroNames: 274
- NeuroLex ID: birnlex_915
- TA98: A14.1.09.426
- TA2: 5544
- FMA: 61885

The substantia innominata, also innominate substance or substantia innominata of Meynert (Latin for unnamed substance), is a series of layers in the human brain consisting partly of gray and partly of white matter, which lies below the anterior part of the thalamus and lentiform nucleus. It is included as part of the anterior perforated substance (as it appears to be perforated by many holes which are actually blood vessels). It is part of the basal forebrain structures and includes the nucleus basalis. A portion of the substantia innominata, below the globus pallidus is considered as part of the extended amygdala.

== Layers ==
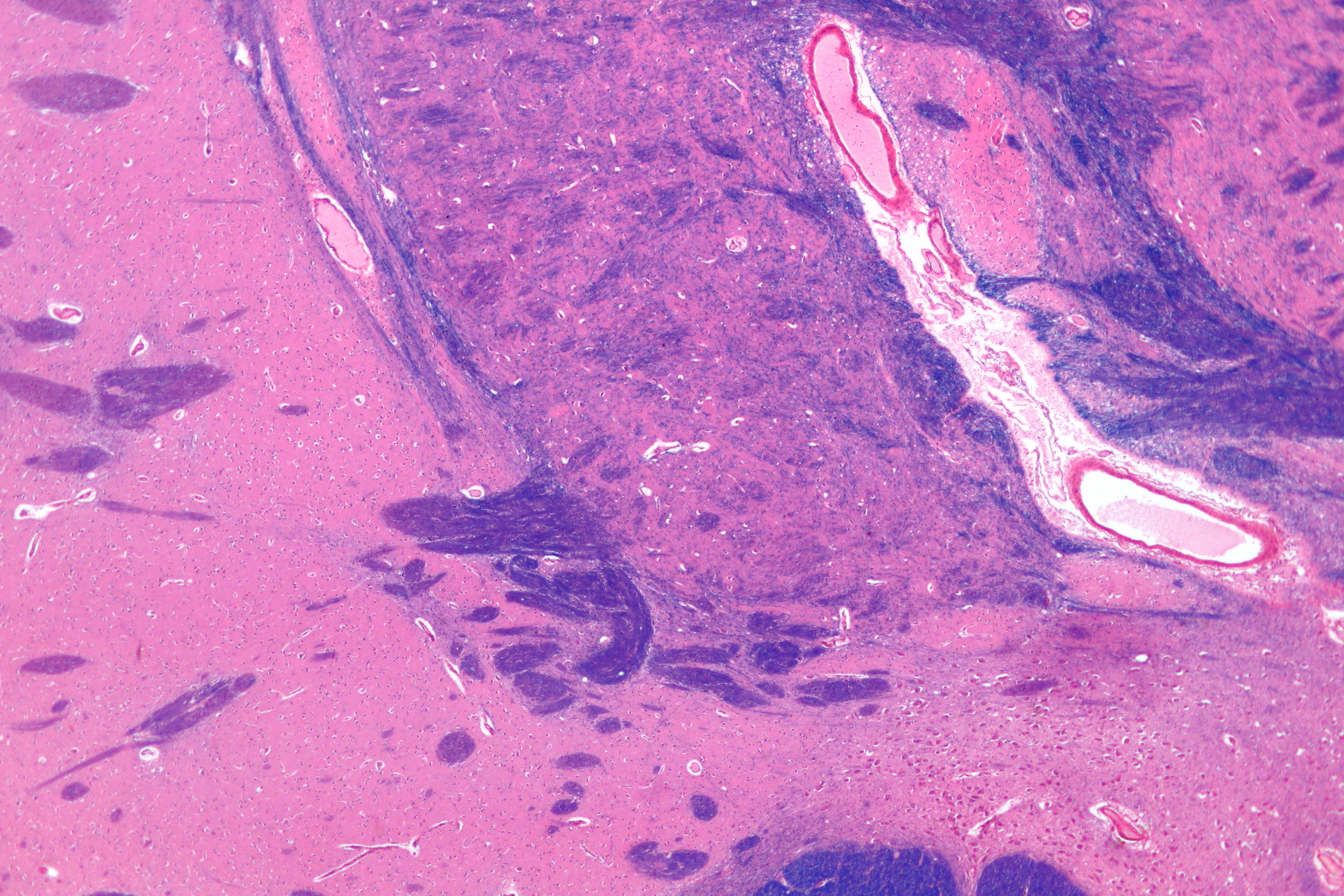
Micrograph showing the substantia innominata (bottom), globus pallidus (top-right), putamen (top-left). LFB-HE stain.

It consists of three layers, superior, middle, and inferior.

- The superior layer is named the ansa lenticularis, and its fibers, derived from the medullary lamina of the lentiform nucleus, pass medially to end in the thalamus and subthalamic region, while others are said to end in the tegmentum and red nucleus.
- The middle layer consists of nerve cells and nerve fibers; fibers enter it from the parietal lobe through the external capsule, while others are said to connect it with the medial longitudinal fasciculus.
- The inferior layer forms the main part of the inferior stalk of the thalamus, and connects this body with the temporal lobe and the insula.

== Striatopallidal system ==
In the late 20th century following improved imaging by staining it was reclassified as part of the striatopallidal system, which is made up of the dorsal striatum and dorsal pallidum, and the ventral striatum and ventral pallidum.
