= Reid Hunt =

American pharmacologist

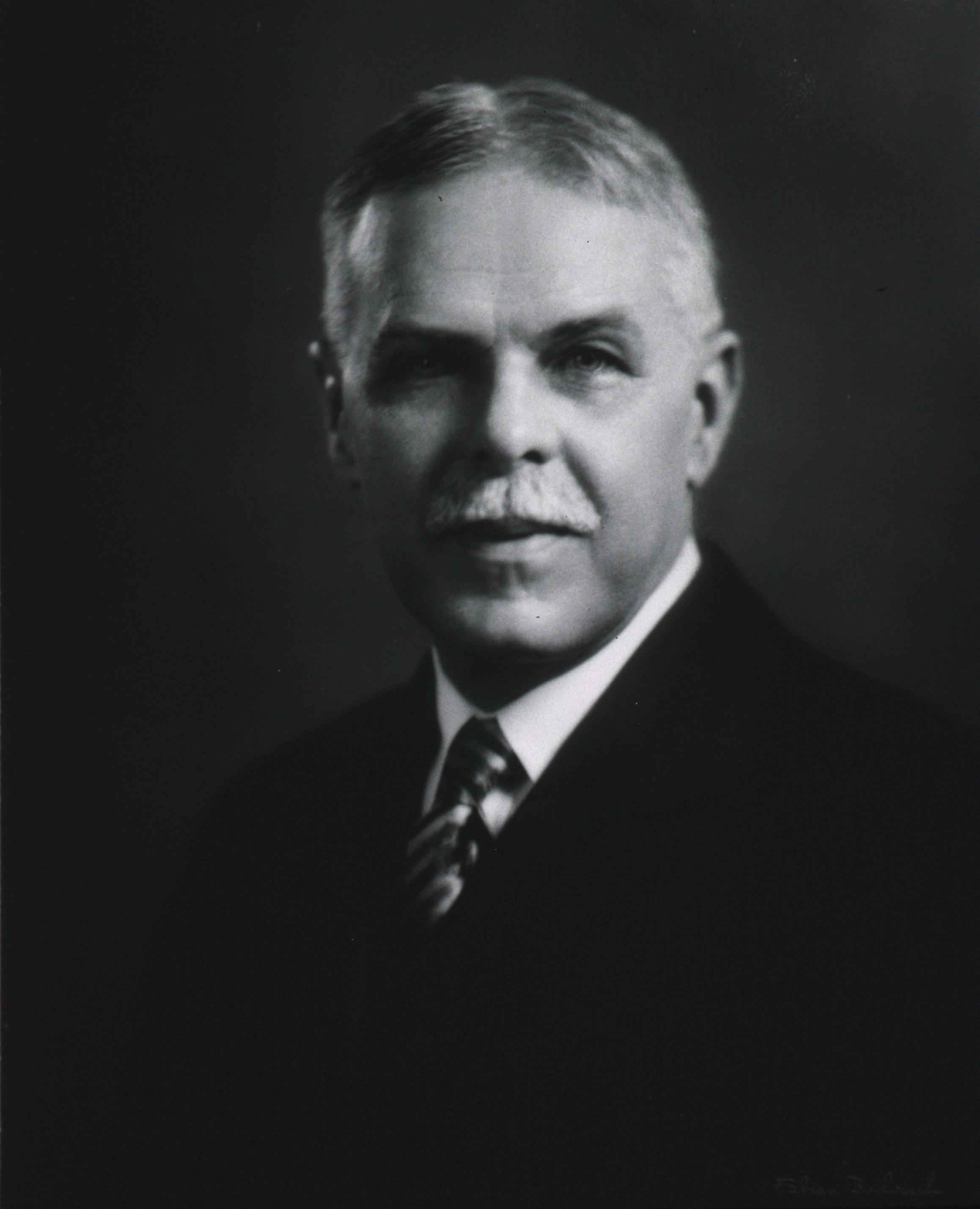
- Born: April 20, 1870; Martinsville, Ohio
- Died: 7 March 1948 (aged 77); Belmont, Massachusetts
- Known for: Acetylcholine
- Notable work: Pharmacological action of acetylcholine

Reid Hunt (1870–1948), was an American pharmacologist, known for his work on adrenal glands; where he postulated that extracts from which cause rise in blood pressure due to its content of adrenaline. When he removed the adrenaline from the extract and he found that it causes fall in blood pressure, which he concluded was due to a derivative of choline, later on known as acetylcholine.

== Research ==
=== Methyl alcohol toxicity ===
“It is believed that these experiments afford clear experimental evidence for the view that extremely moderate amount of alcohol may cause distinct changes in certain physiological functions, and that these changes, in certain circumstances may be injurious to the body. The results also further that in some respects the action of alcohol as a food is different from that of carbohydrates and finally that in all probability certain physiological processes in ‘moderate drinkers’ are distinctly different from those in abstainers.”
Reid hunt's summary about his research on alcohol.

=== Activity of acetylcholine ===
"I frequently obtained extracts of the suprarenal (and also of the brain) which caused a fall of blood pressure... and which were also more powerful than choline... I also got results...which led me to think that at least some of these results were to be attributed to a precursor of choline or to some compound of choline...From these observations it seemed not impossible that...cholin or to some compounds may have some importance in certain pathological conditions...acetylcholine the first of this series, is a substance of extraordinary physiological activity. In fact, i think it safe to state that as regards its effect upon the circulation, it is the most powerful substance known...we have not determined the cause of the fall of blood pressure from acetylcholine, but from the fact that it can be prevented entirely by atropine, I am inclined to think that it is due to an effect upon the terminations of the vagus in the heart."
Commentry made by Reid Hunt in a paper published along with Taveau in the year 1906

=== Thyroid gland ===
During the study of thyroid gland iodine content and its physiological activity he demonstrated the presence of thyroid hormone in the human blood. Studies involving acetonitrile showed that the poisoning is mainly due to the hydrocyanic acid liberated in the organism and its ability to neutralise various sulphur compounds.

== Positions held ==
- Tutor in physiology (1896–1898), Columbia university medical school.
- Chief of pharmacological division (1904–1913), Hygienic laboratory, U.S. public health service.
- Chair of pharmacology, Harvard medical school.
- Chairman of council on pharmacy and chemistry of the American medical association.
- President of pharmacopeial convention.
- Chairman of northeastern section of American chemical society.
- Secretary and president of American society for pharmacology and experimental therapeutics.
- Chairman of the section of on pharmacology and therapeutics of American medical association.
- Consultant for chemical warfare service, U.S. army
- Consultant, Massachusetts state board of health
- Consultant, Hygienic laboratory.
- Member, Drug standardisation committee of league of nations.
